= Apulian picture vases for a funeral ceremony (Berlin Antique Collection) =

Collection of artifacts

Coordinates: 50°31′10″N 13°23′54″E

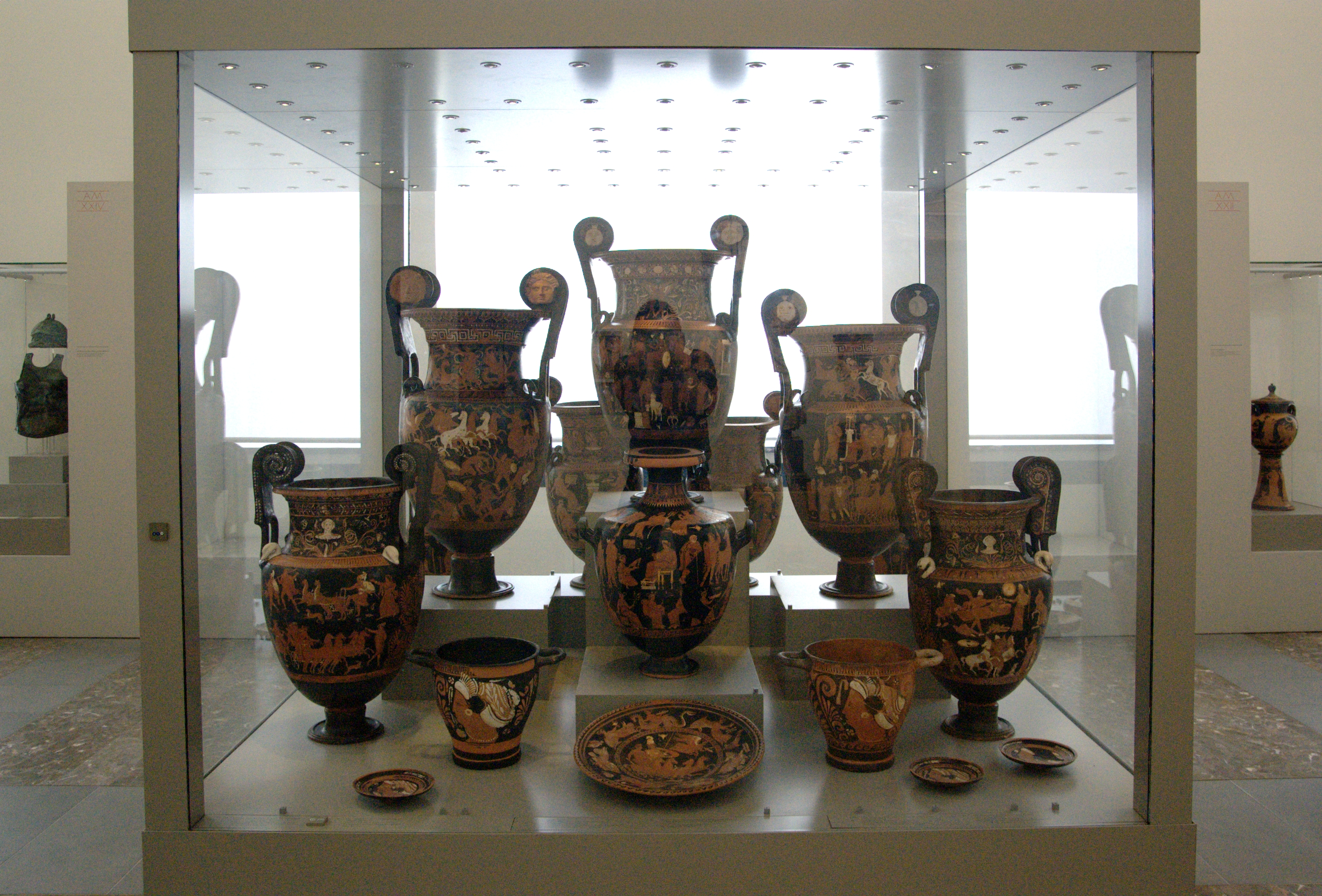
The vase collection is listed until 2010

The find complex associated with a group of ancient Apulian picture vases for a funeral ceremony (German: Apulische Bildervasen für eine Totenfeier) consists of 29 vases, plates, vase fragments, and fragment groups, which are showpieces of the Berlin Collection of Classical Antiquities in the Altes Museum. The vase ensemble comprises vases of varying sizes and values, consistently decorated with images in the rich style of Apulian vase painting. Additionally, there are vases of medium and low quality. All the pieces likely originate from a looted excavation in the latter half of the 20th century.

== History and composition of the find ==
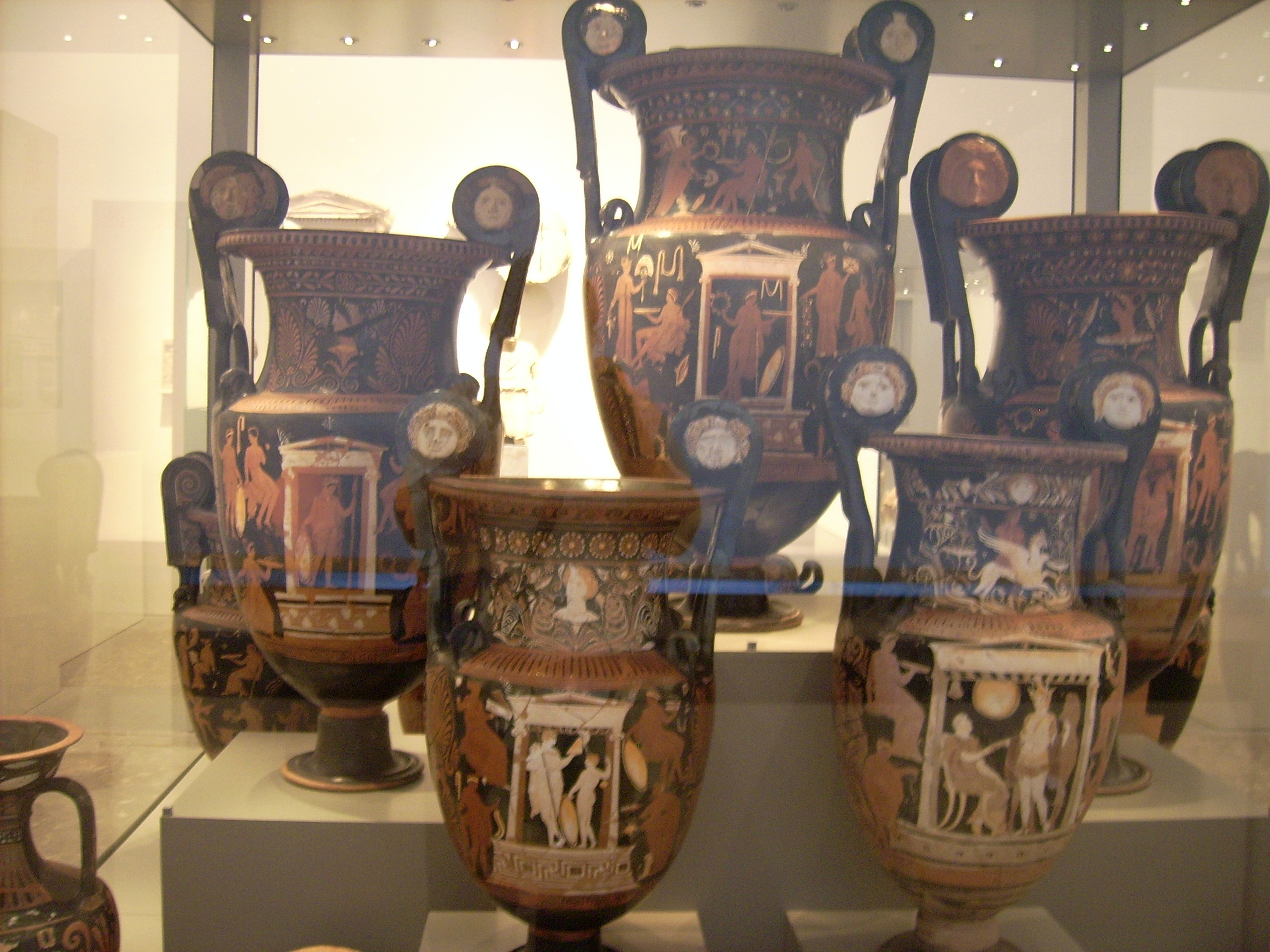
View from the back

The artifacts' origins remain uncertain. The Berlin Collection of Classical Antiquities procured these items in 1984, facilitated by the antiquities dealer Christoph Leon, purportedly from the estate of a Basel family. According to the art dealer, the vases were bought by an unknown traveler from Geneva in Naples in the late 19th century. However, subsequent investigations revealed that these vases were actually discovered in the latter half of the 20th century through illicit excavations in Apulia and entered the art market through the dealer Giacomo Medici in Geneva. In 1984, the museum did not acquire the complete find, as the entire ensemble was not available for purchase. This was rectified in 1991 when multiple plate fragments were acquired, allowing for the reconstruction of several plates and the discovery of clues for additional tableware within the complex.

The clay vases were identified as Apulian based on stylistic analysis. Since these vases were seldom found outside Apulia, it is unlikely they originated in Naples or nearby areas. They all date back to around 340 BC and are linked to a specific vase maker from Taranto. About eight out of 20 of the vases display funeral themes like naiskoi on the front or back, suggesting they were used for funerary decoration. Most vases, except for a few without counterparts, can be paired with others, indicating they were likely arranged for a special occasion. This aligns with Apulian funeral ceremonies, where symmetrical grave items were common.

After restoration, the discovery includes seven sizable volute craters, two amphorae, two skyphoi, a hydria, a large plate, nine fish plates with pieces, four women's head plates with fragments, and several fragments, including the base of another volute crater and numerous bowls. Each of these items had a distinctive function in everyday life. However, some pieces from the discovery may be difficult or impossible to use for their intended purpose. The skyphoi, used for drinking mixed wine, had a capacity exceeding ten liters, rendering it impractical for ordinary use. Additionally, most other large vessels were unsuitable for use due to the lack of a seal between the base and body, with some being incomplete, leaving them incapable of holding liquid. These findings imply that the vessels were utilized in a sacred or funerary capacity.

Large high-quality vases with eye-catching motifs were not for functional use, but rather to create an impressive visual impact at burials. These preserved vases acted as showpieces at funeral ceremonies, but their purpose as simple ceramics, presumably used as grave goods, remains uncertain. Similarities with other grave discoveries indicate that the vases' place of origin was a chamber tomb, which emerged during the early 4th century B.C.

== Individual pieces ==
=== Phrixos crater ===
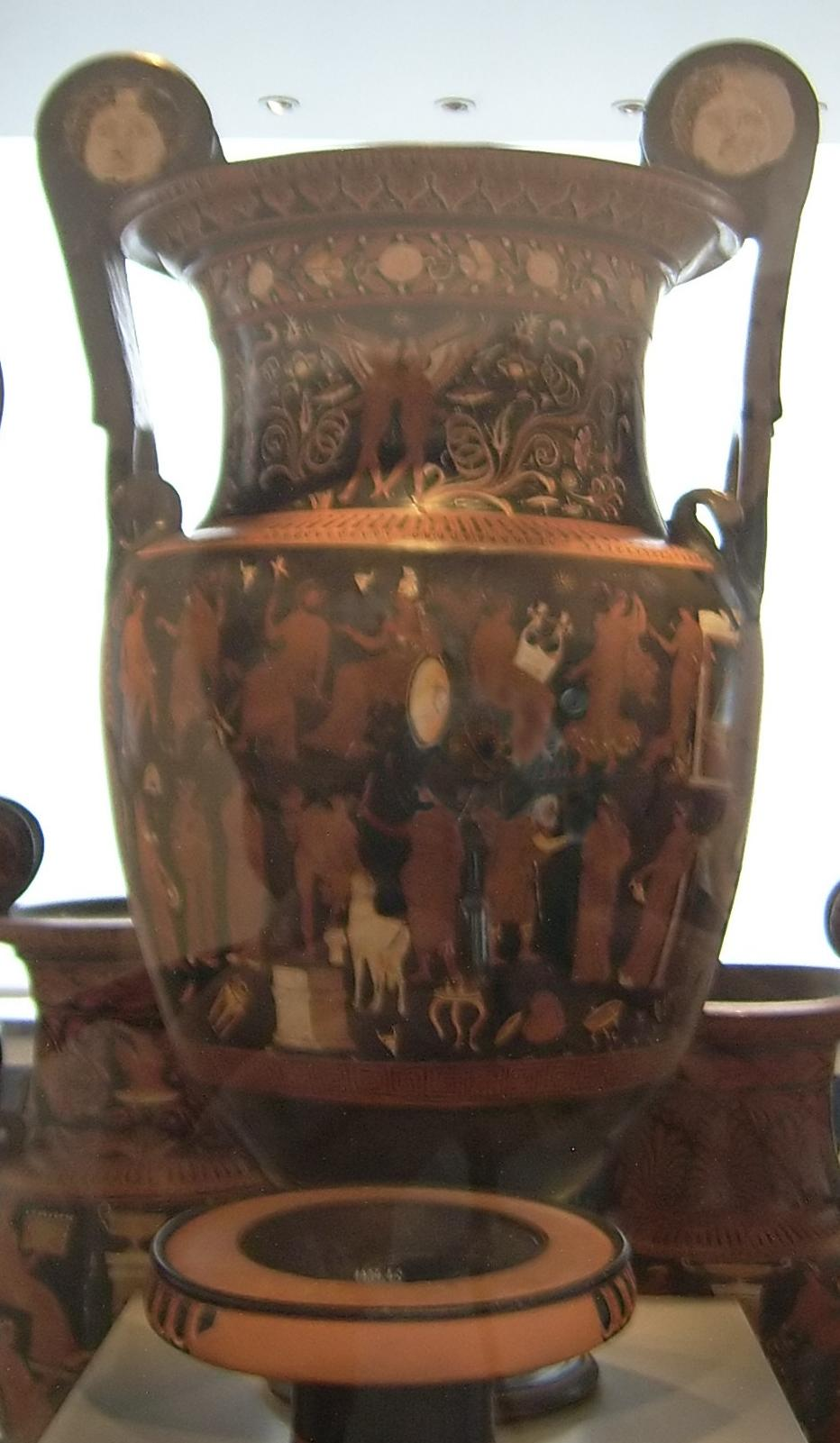
Front of Phrixos crater

The Phrixos crater, a volute crater adorned with masked handles, stands as the third-largest individual piece, measuring 102 cm in height. Attributed to the Darius Painter by Arthur Dale Trendall, it is regarded as one of the artist's finest creations. While no direct match has been found, it is assumed that the single vase foot may be a fragment of this particular counterpart.

On both sides of the two central winged creatures, one can see an imaginative tendril winding its way upward. The Darius painter portrays a vine with stems emerging from the flowers, which has no natural equivalent. Above this decoration lies a band of oak leaves forming a kind of garland and decorated with a painted chain of eggs. It is likely that the artist drew inspiration from a popular decoration used during celebrations in Apulia.

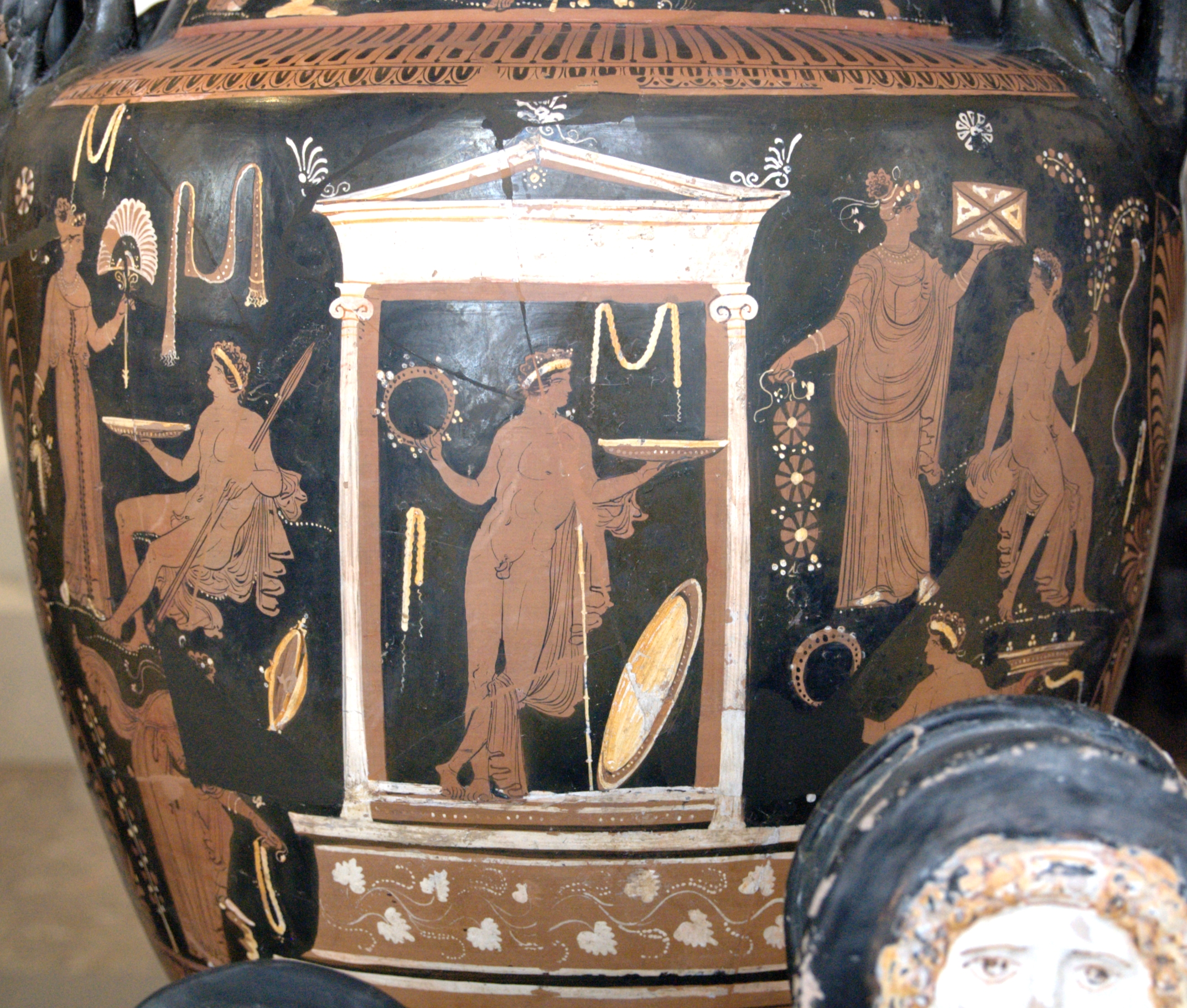
Back

The primary illustration is separated into two levels: an upper divine level and a lower human level. All the main figures in the frieze are inscribed. In the center, there is the young Phrixos with his foot raised and garlanding a ram, which is typical for sacrificial animals. The painted altar below further validates the interpretation as a sacrificial scene. To the left of Phrixos, his stepmother Ino is standing, and to the right, his father, King Athamas, has a sacrificial knife drawn. However, Phrixos is the one to be sacrificed as a result of a false oracle from his stepmother, not the ram. Moving to the right, an elderly scholar informs Phrixos' sister Helle of her brother's imminent sacrifice, which is reflected in the young woman's horrified expression. The last figure on the page is a woman who is described with the evocative name Euphemia. Euphemia - the one with the good reputation - is not just a name, but also a description of the ritual silence of people taking part in a sacred act. In the upper frieze, an assembly of gods looks down on what is happening among the people. The second person from the left is Nephele, the biological mother of Phrixos and Helle, who moves excitedly, with fear and horror, and yet full of elegance. To her right is Hermes, who will apparently bring her the message of the imminent divine rescue of her two children.

Several specific details, such as the sacrificial bandages in the siblings' hair, Athamas' pointing at his wife, and the emotions displayed by Helle and Nephele, become recognizable only with the familiarity of the Greek legend of Phrixos and Helle. This leads to the assumption that the vase was created for a knowledgeable audience in Greek mythology.

The reverse side illustrates the previously mentioned temple-like structure associated with funerary scenes visible on many vases. A youthful, naked figure casually leans on a staff, holding a bowl in one hand and a wreath in the other. Three equally youthful individuals stand on each side of the tomb, adorned in festive attire rather than mourning. The portrait on the neck of the vase depicts the deceased once again, this time in an afterlife setting. He is depicted holding a bowl of wine, capturing the dripping wine from two hanging grapes above him.

=== Rhesos crater ===
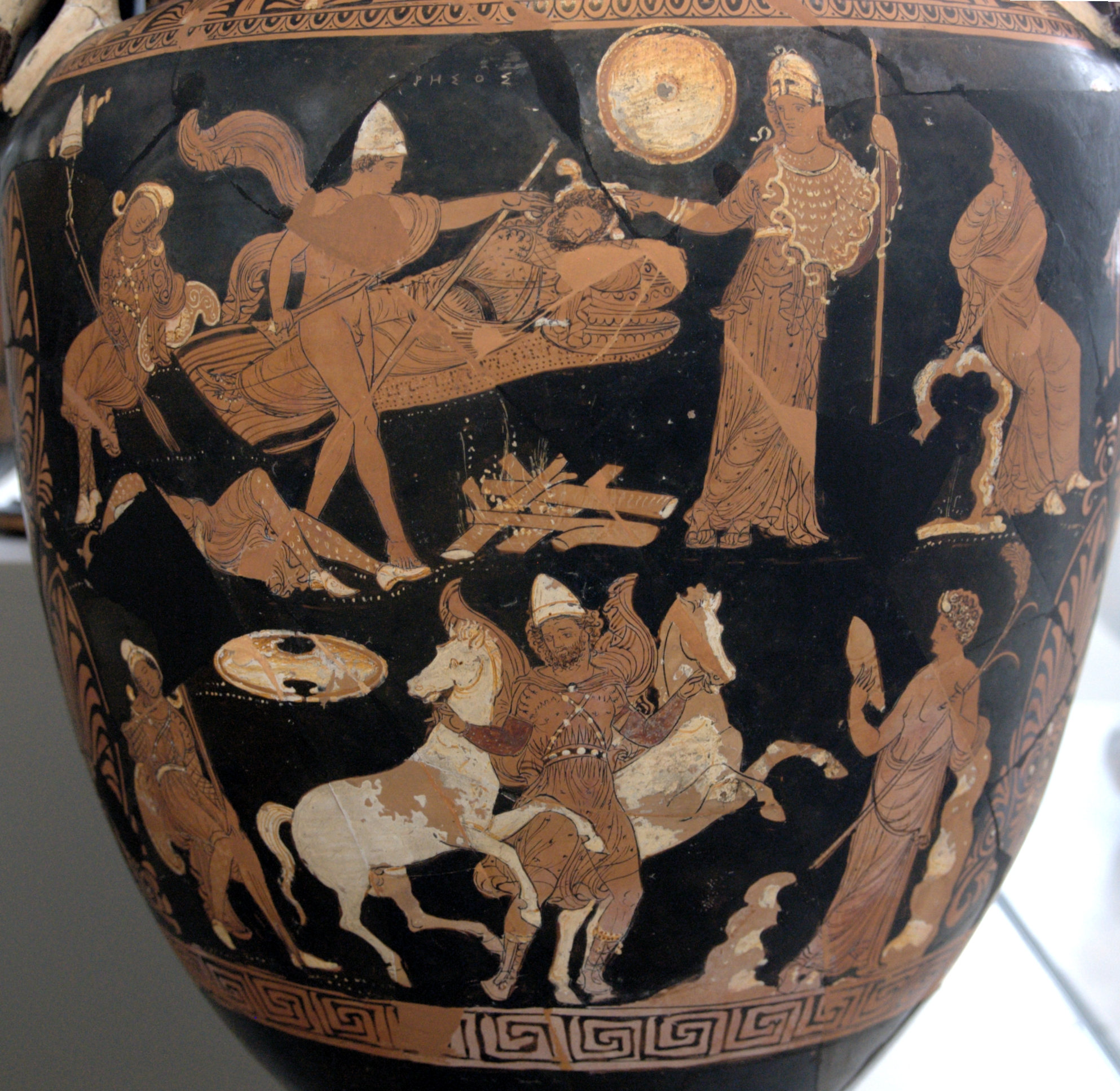
Rhesos crater

The Rhesos crater is similar in many ways to the Phrixos crater. It stands as a volute crater, measuring 82 cm in height and featuring three scroll handles. Attributed to the Darius Painter, similar to the Phrixos crater, its main figures bear inscriptions. The mythological story of the Thracian king Rhesos depicted here is one of the oldest Greek legends and is recorded in Homer. The rendition of this story aligns with a tragedy focusing on the central figure, Rhesos, preserved within the works of Euripides. This tale, a part of Trojan mythology, revolves around the murder of Rhesos by Diomedes.

=== Persephone crater ===
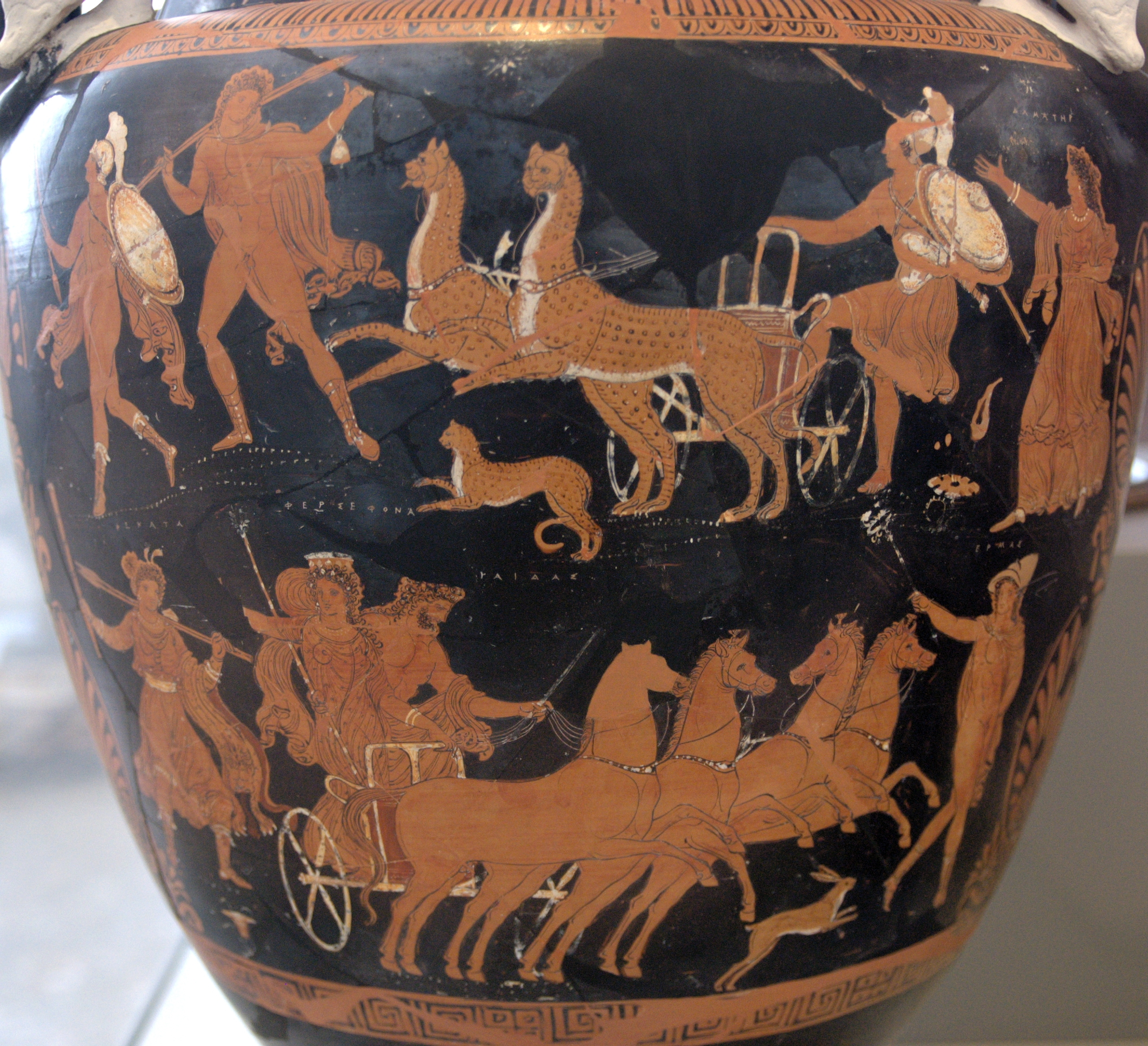
Persephone crater

The Persephone crater is a volute crater with spiraled handles, measuring 86.5 cm in height. It is attributed to the Underworld Painter and is the counterpart of the Rhesos crater, although the style of drawing does not have the elegance and delicacy of its counterpart. The depiction of the story is a widely popular motif seen on Apulian vases, but this particular detailing is uncommon. It is the tale of the abduction of Persephone, the goddess of vegetation, by Hades, the ultimate god of the underworld. The lower row of paintings depicts abduction as its main theme. Hades rides to the underworld on his chariot with the desperate Persephone, who stretches out her arm pleading for help. Two other divine beings are in the scene. However, Persephone cannot rely on them for help. As the guide to the underworld for the dead, Hermes knows the best way to get there and leads his uncle Hades. Following the chariot is the mysterious goddess Hecate, holding a torch. The focal point of the upper frieze is a pack of panthers, ridden by a servant of Demeter, Persephone's mother, in pursuit. On the right-hand side is the mother of the kidnapped woman, raising an arm in sorrow and sending her servants after her. However, catching up with Persephone is impossible. The painter has created an effect by having the explanatory inscriptions and Hades with his female prey fleeing from left to right, while the pursuers move from right to left. This highlights the hopelessness of the chase.

=== Gigantomachy crater ===
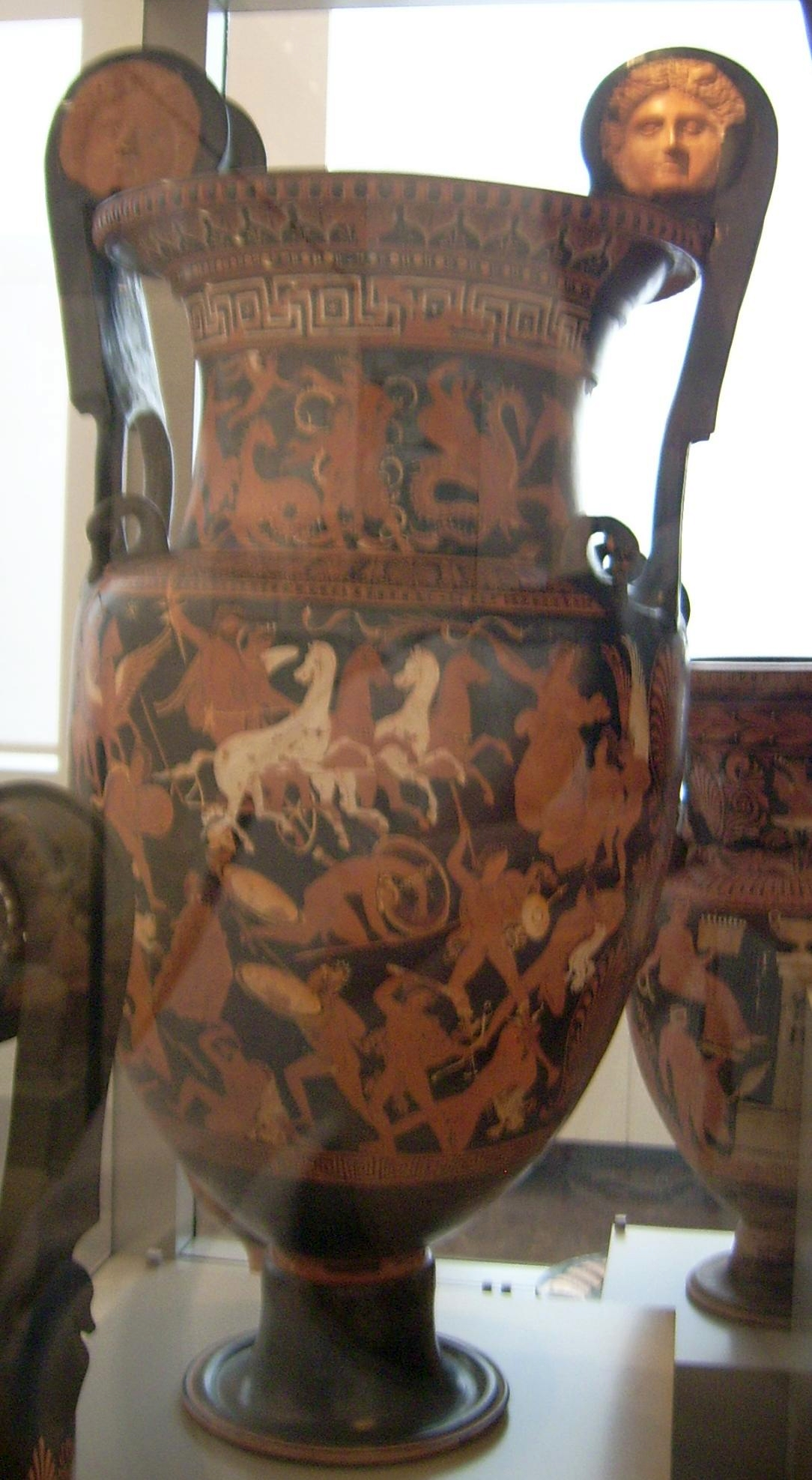
Front of Gigantomachy crater

The Gigantomachy crater is a volute crater equipped with mask handles and a separately crafted foot. It stands at a height of 113 cm, making it the largest surviving artifact in the find complex. The Underworld Painter is credited with its creation, and the vase depicts the battle of gods against giants in the Gigantomachy, a popular theme in Greek art.

The vase is notable for its unique composition of the depiction. In the central motif, Zeus, the god of thunder and lightning, is depicted riding into battle on a chariot led by Nike, the goddess of victory. He is shown hurling a thunderbolt at a defeated giant lying on the ground. To Zeus' left rides his brother, Poseidon, the god of the sea, on his winged horse, Pegasus. This mythologically appropriate motif is rarely used, given Pegasus is the child of Poseidon and Gorgo-Medusa. The remaining pairs of fighters are positioned in an iconographically suitable manner. Athena, wearing a helmet and armed with a shield and lance, is engaging in battle with an equally equipped giant. Dionysus, draped in a panther skin, is fighting a giant also clad in a panther skin. Heracles, donning a lion skin, is battling a giant attired in the same manner. The fighting couple to the right of Zeus is particularly original. Here the goddess of love Aphrodite is fighting a young giant. He gazes languishingly at the goddess, who is holding a palm frond as a sign of victory, and kneels before her. Eros seizes this moment and binds his hands behind his back. Love thus triumphs over violence.

Another battle for love is depicted in the neck painting. Peleus battles the sea goddess Thetis, who was prophesied that her child would surpass his father in power. Peleus wins the battle, as indicated by the winged Eros flying to crown him as the victor. The victory earns him the love of Thetis, and their union produces Achilles, the most powerful Greek of the Trojan War. The battle is flanked by dangerous sea serpents.

=== Priamid crater ===
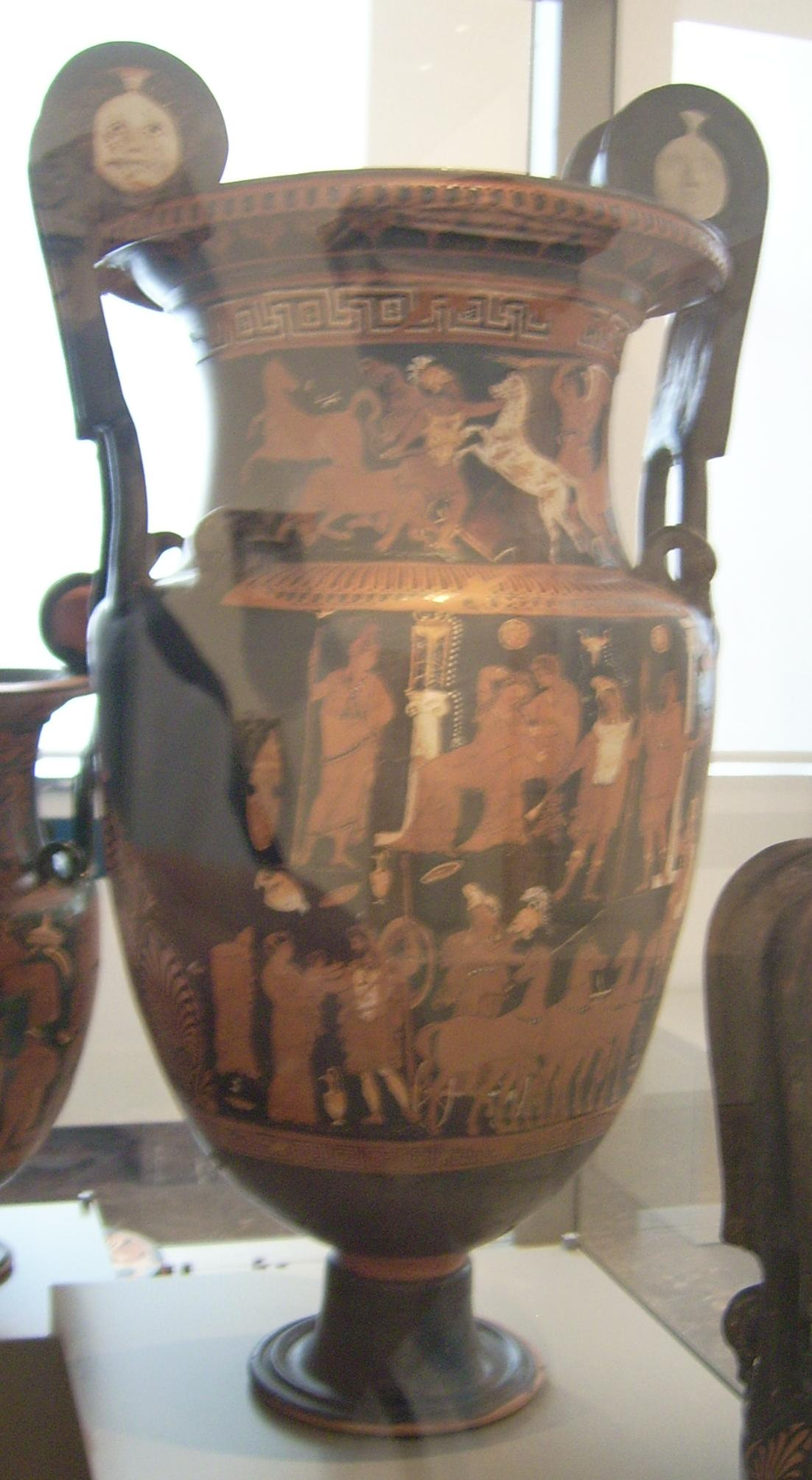
Front of the Priamid crater

The Priamid crater, identified as the counterpart to the Gigantomachy crater and also attributed to the Underworld Painter, stands at a height of 107 cm, making it the second largest piece within the collection. This vase lacks inscriptions, necessitating interpretation based solely on the depicted scenes. The lower panel features a charioteer in the center, distinguished by a Phrygian cap, indicative of an oriental cultural identity. To the left, a scene of farewell depicts a man standing alongside a child in the arms of a woman who is reaching for the man. The second woman, to whom the man's gaze is directed, stands further away on the left edge. Although partially lost, the image conveys the simple interpretation of a heartbreaking farewell. The male figure in the farewell scene is Hector bidding farewell to his wife Andromache and his son Astyanax, who is cradled in the arms of his nurse, before his duel with Achilles.

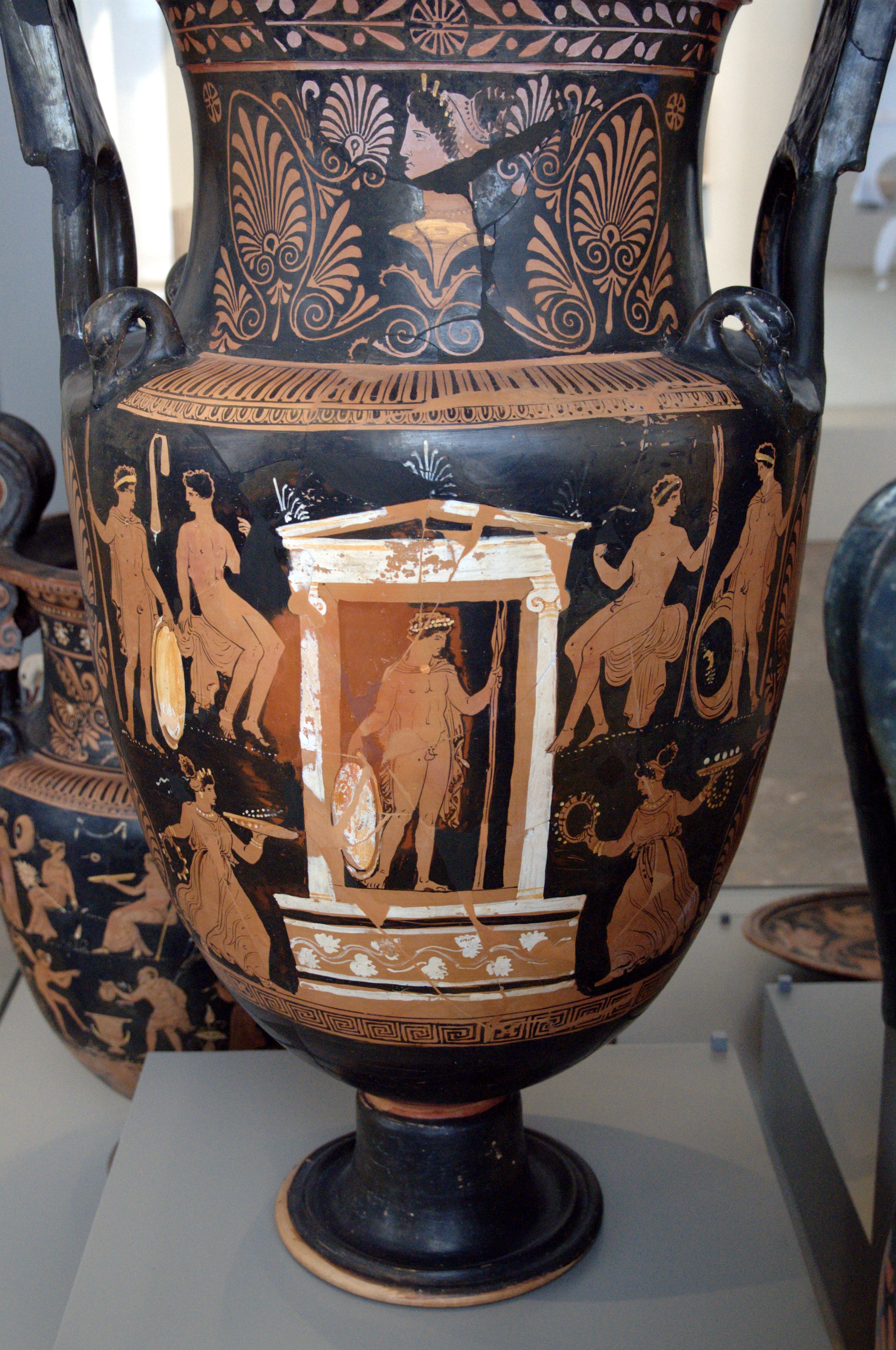
Back of the Priamid Crater

The upper frieze features Hecabe as the main subject, offering comfort to Cassandra - a revered figure symbolized by laurel branches wrapped in bandages, representative of her gift of the ability to see into the future. Despite her foresight, Cassandra's ability was given by Apollo on the condition that no one would believe her predictions. Therefore, it is no surprise that her parents, Priam to her left and her mother, do not share her concern for Hector. In the top right corner, an eagle is visible, clutching a snake in its beak - a further indication of Cassandra's prediction. The sign is only recognized by another Trojan, a young man, likely Cassandra's twin brother Helenos, who possesses the gift of sight as well. The literary inspiration for this crater is clearly evident. This vase is known as the Priamid crater, named for the numerous mythological characters from the family of Priam, portrayed within it.

The neck portrait illustrates a popular story from Apulia, depicted on various vases. In the story, a bearded warrior kills a horse with his sword. The warrior, named Oinomaos, is the son of the God of War Ares, and was prophesized to die at the hands of his daughter's future husband. Oinomaos challenges all candidates for his daughter's hand in marriage to a deadly chariot race. As his father had given him horses that were faster than the wind, he was able to defeat many of his daughter's suitors. Nevertheless, one contestant resorted to a trick and removed the wheel hub from Oinomaos' chariot, resulting in a collision during the race. The painting displays Oinomaos' chariot in the background and a desperate Oinomaos in the foreground, killing the horses in his rage. A demon with wings holds a torch, appearing from the right to represent the madness that has overtaken Oinomaos. The back of the vase shows a tomb.

=== More craters ===
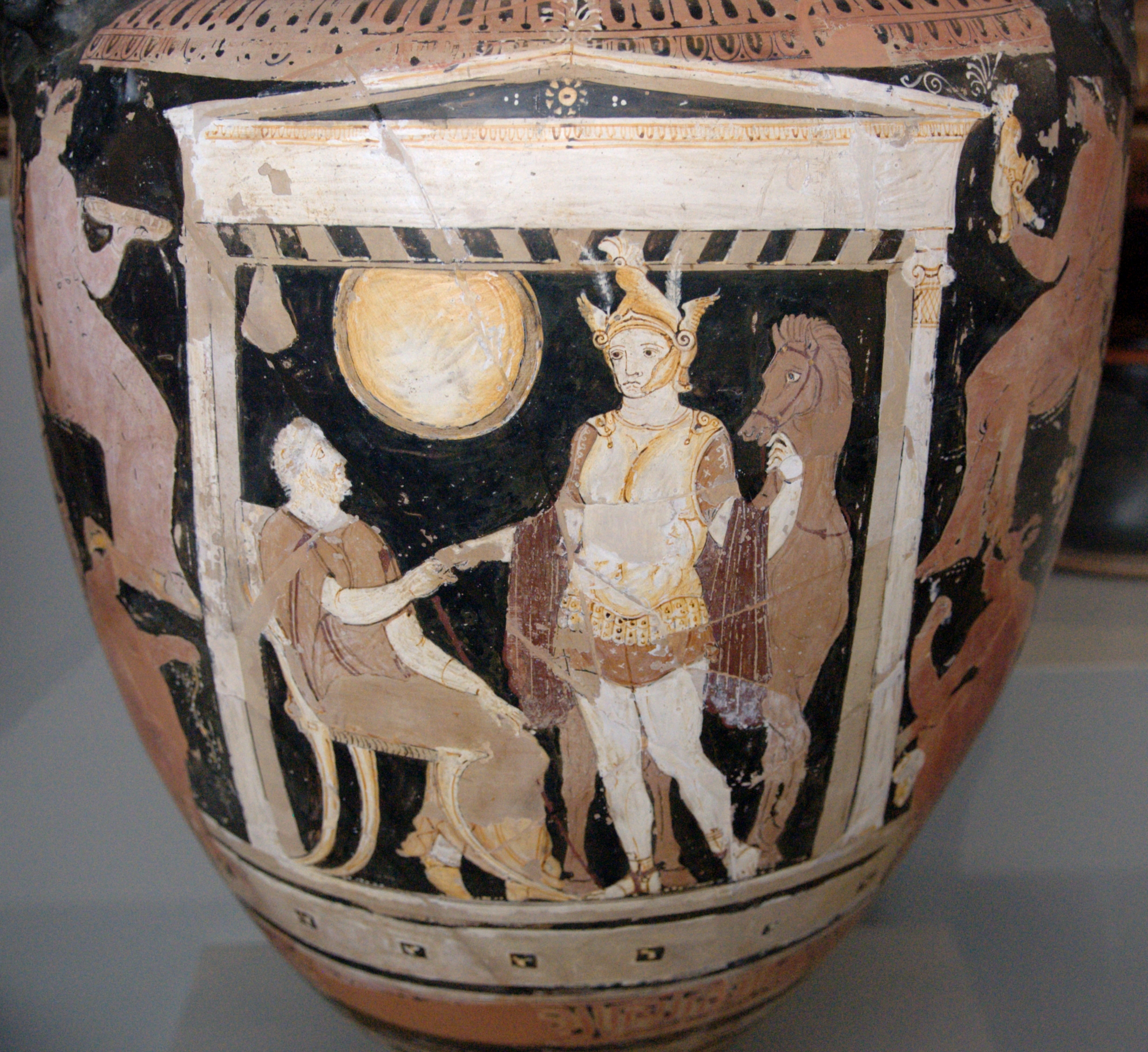
Volute crater by the Loebbecke painter (1984.42)

In addition to the craters, which depict a mythological story, there are two other volute craters with masked handles, which are considered to belong together and depict a tomb building on the front and a funerary stele on the back. When the two Naiskos vases are placed opposite each other, it appears as if the figures are looking at each other.

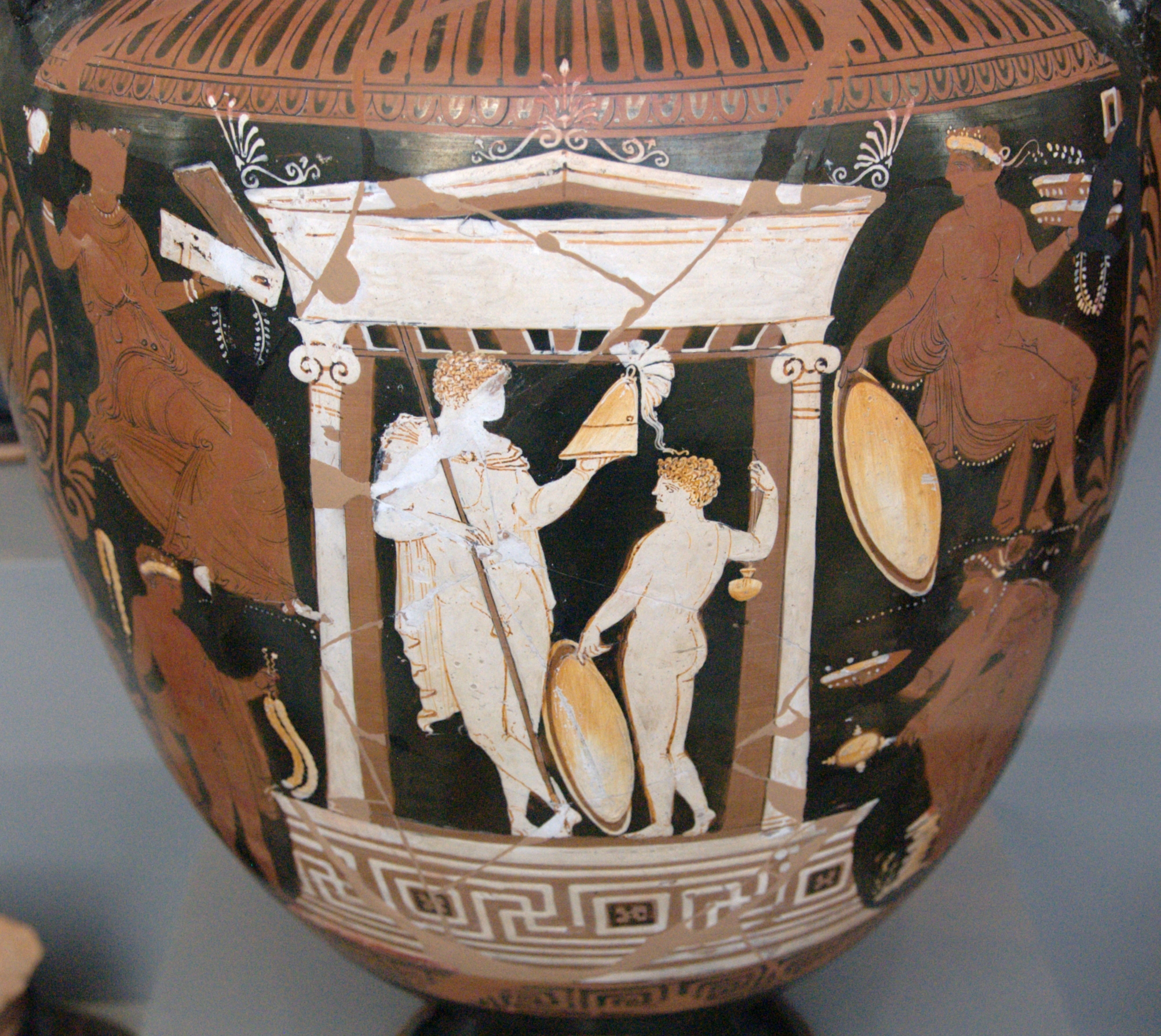
Volute crater by the Painter of Copenhagen 4223 (1984.43)

The larger vase, 84.5 cm in height, is credited to the Loebbecke painter. The tomb naiskos consists of two columns with Ionic-style features, which were also highlighted with white paint. Within the naiskos, there is an old man seated on a klismos and a standing warrior with a Chalcidian helmet holding a horse via the reins. The figures outside the tomb are poorly preserved because the lines of paint do not adhere properly. On the right side of the image, there is a woman sitting on the ground, leaning on her right hand while holding a pial with the other. Opposite her is an armed youth in a similar posture, resting on a cloak and holding a special form of the Chalcidian helmet from Lower Italy. At the bottom right, there is a standing woman, and on her opposite left, a standing youth faces her. On the other side of the image, two women and two youths are shown gathered around a grave pillar.

The second volute crater, measuring 76.5 cm in height, is attributed to the painter of Copenhagen 4223. Its structure resembles the previous one. The reverse side features two young men and women standing around a grave pillar, while the front highlights a standing young man in naiskos leaning against an Ionic pillar. Standing next to him is a boy who holds the man's round shield with one hand and an aryballos with the other. The four figures surrounding the naiskos resemble those on the Loebecke painter's vase, with the exception that the seated woman is holding a mirror and the young man across from her is holding a round shield.

=== Eleusinian hydria ===
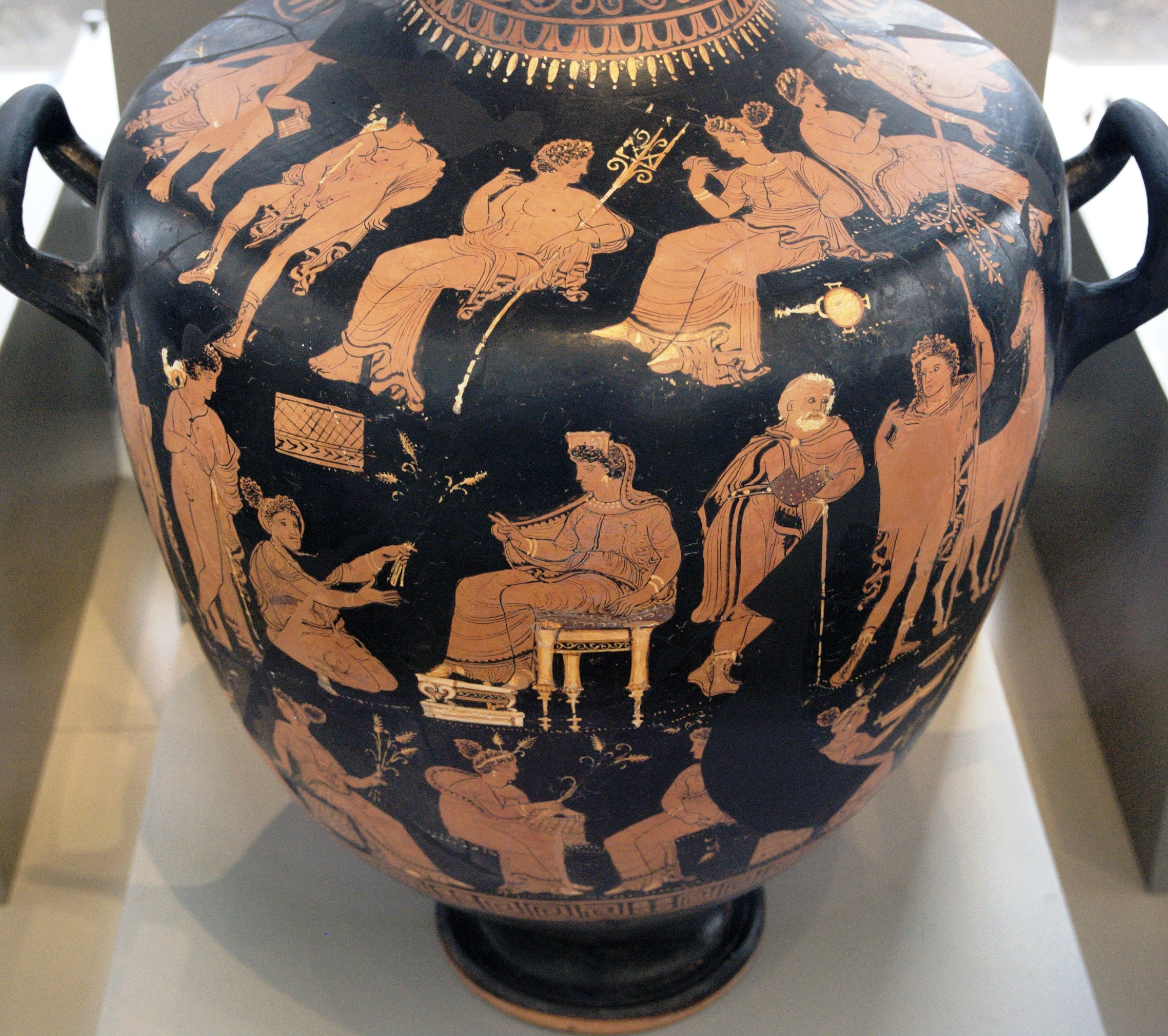
Eleusinian hydria

The Eleusinian hydria, standing at a height of 68 cm, is attributed to the Varrese painter. The inscriptions do not provide an explanation for the depicted story, and this form of the story is not known in Greek iconography. Interpretation of the scenes depicted on the vase is based on the visual narrative and aligned with existing written traditions.

The painting is structured into three registers. At the top, on the hydria's shoulder, a group of gods is observed looking down at events unfolding on Earth, a common portrayal on Apulian vases. The depicted gods include Pan, Hermes, a youthful Poseidon, Aphrodite identified by the mirror next to her, Apollo, and Artemis. Below them, a goddess seated on a throne commands attention, in front of whom a kneeling woman offers ears of corn, revealing the goddess as Demeter. The six young women on the lowest register are similarly associated with Demeter, recognized by attributes such as ears of corn, flat baskets used in cult rituals, and four of them carrying round boxes commonly employed for storing cult objects during the Eleusinian mysteries. Adjacent to the goddess, an elderly tutor and a young curly-haired boy are depicted.

The figures in the story have a tale found in the Homeric hymns. The story, as depicted on the Persephone Crater, tells of Demeter's daughter being abducted by Hades into the underworld. Following this, the grieving goddess roamed the lands.

=== Amphorae ===
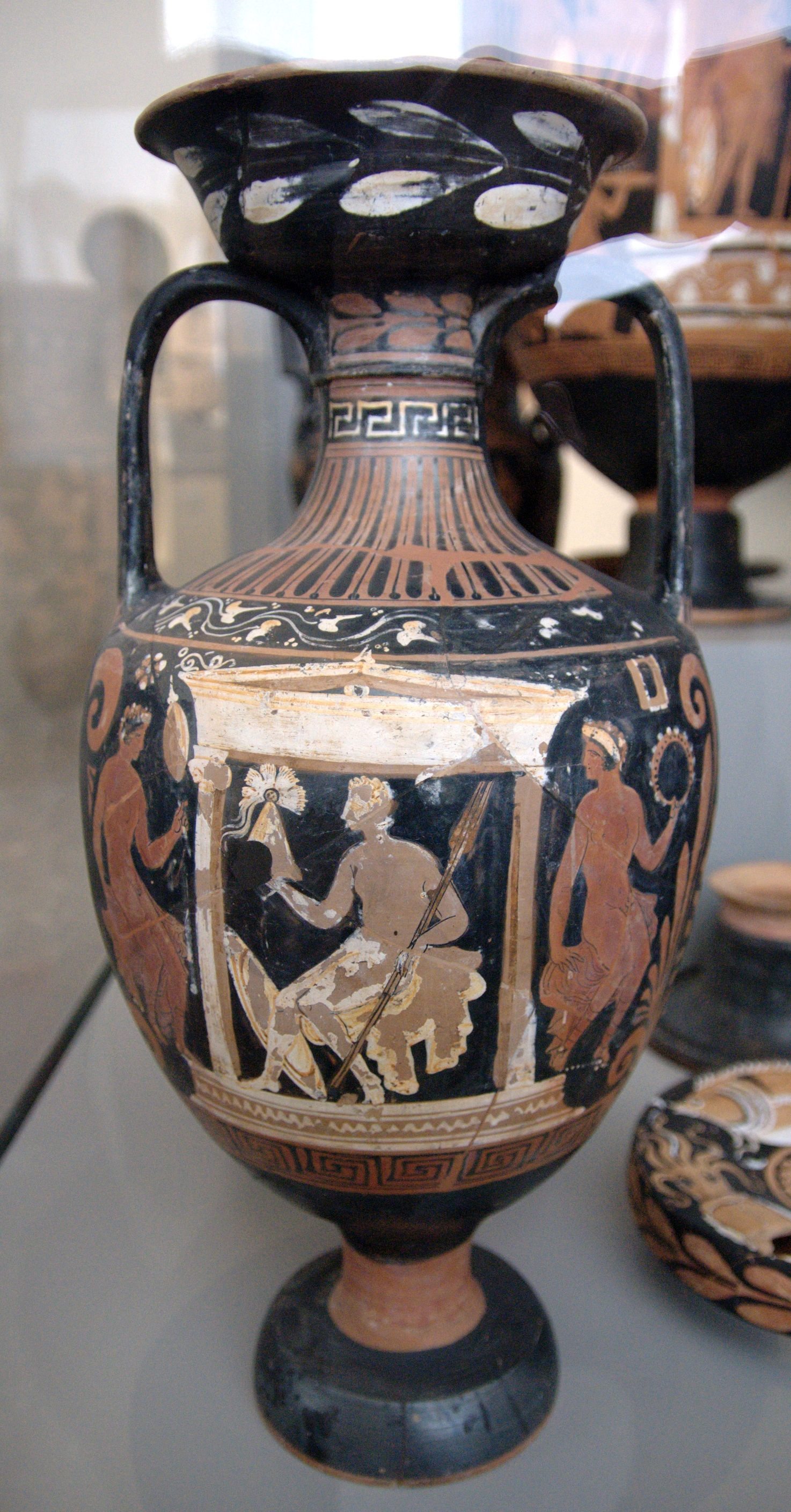
One of the amphoras (1984.49)

The two amphorae belonging to the find were made by the Lucera painter. Both amphorae are almost identical in design. As with two of the volute craters, there are funerary structures on the front and funerary stelae on the back. A young, armed man sits in an Ionic naiskos. The only difference is in the two figures standing next to the naiskos. While there is a young man on the left of both objects, there is also a young man on the right of the smaller vase and a woman on the larger amphora. The smaller of the amphorae is 56.5 centimeters high, and the larger is 64 cm.

=== Skyphoi ===
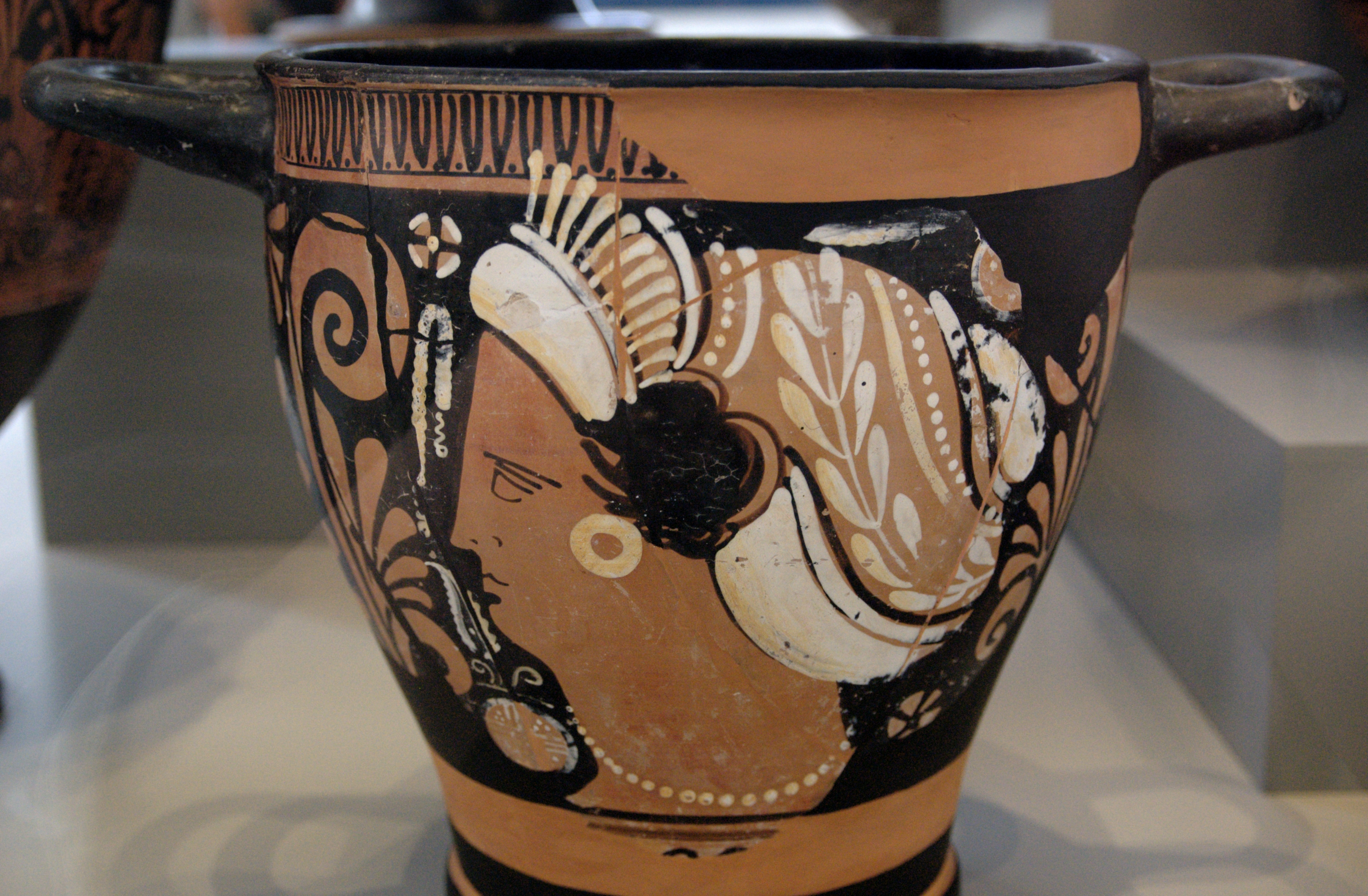
Woman's head skyphos (1984.59)

Like the amphorae, two oversized skyphoi are part of the middle tableware quality class of the discovered items. These drinking vessels were decorated on both sides by the Armidale painter, portraying female heads adorned with detailed white-colored hooded headdresses. In front of the faces, a tubular daisy is depicted, encircled by rosettes. The sides of the vessels showcase large palmettes positioned under the handles. One of the skyphoi stands at a height of 30.5 centimeters, while the other measures 31 cm.

=== Heracles plate ===
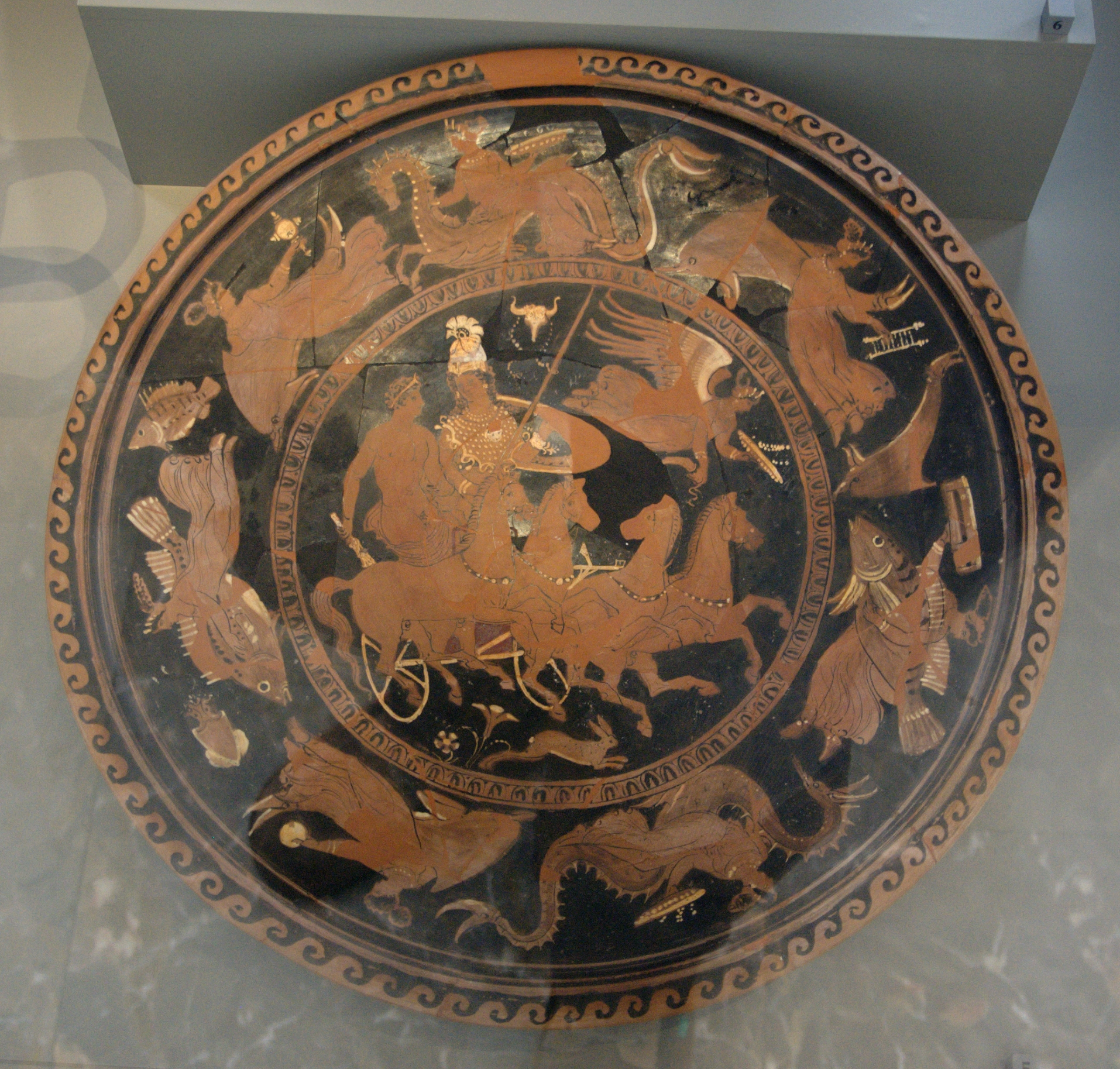
The Heracles Plate (1984.47)

The Heracles plate is attributed to the Phrixos group from the circle of the underworld painter. It has a diameter of 50 cm. The central image depicts the apotheosis of Heracles. The hero, now on his way to Olympus, is not depicted in the usual way. He is not bearded, but depicted as a youth, symbolizing the eternal youth of the gods. Instead of the lion's skin, he wears a cloak. The only attribute that identifies the man as Heracles is the club in his hand. Next to him on the quadriga is Athena, the hero's patron goddess. Heracles is thus depicted like all the other deceased young men on the vases. It is unclear whether this alignment is programmatic or merely the result of the painter's imagination.

The encircling frieze illustrates sea women riding various sea creatures like sea bream, dolphins, and sea dragons. They hold diverse objects—a mirror, a toy ball, a small box, and a musical instrument—all symbolizing attributes of a carefree afterlife.

=== Women's head and fish plate ===
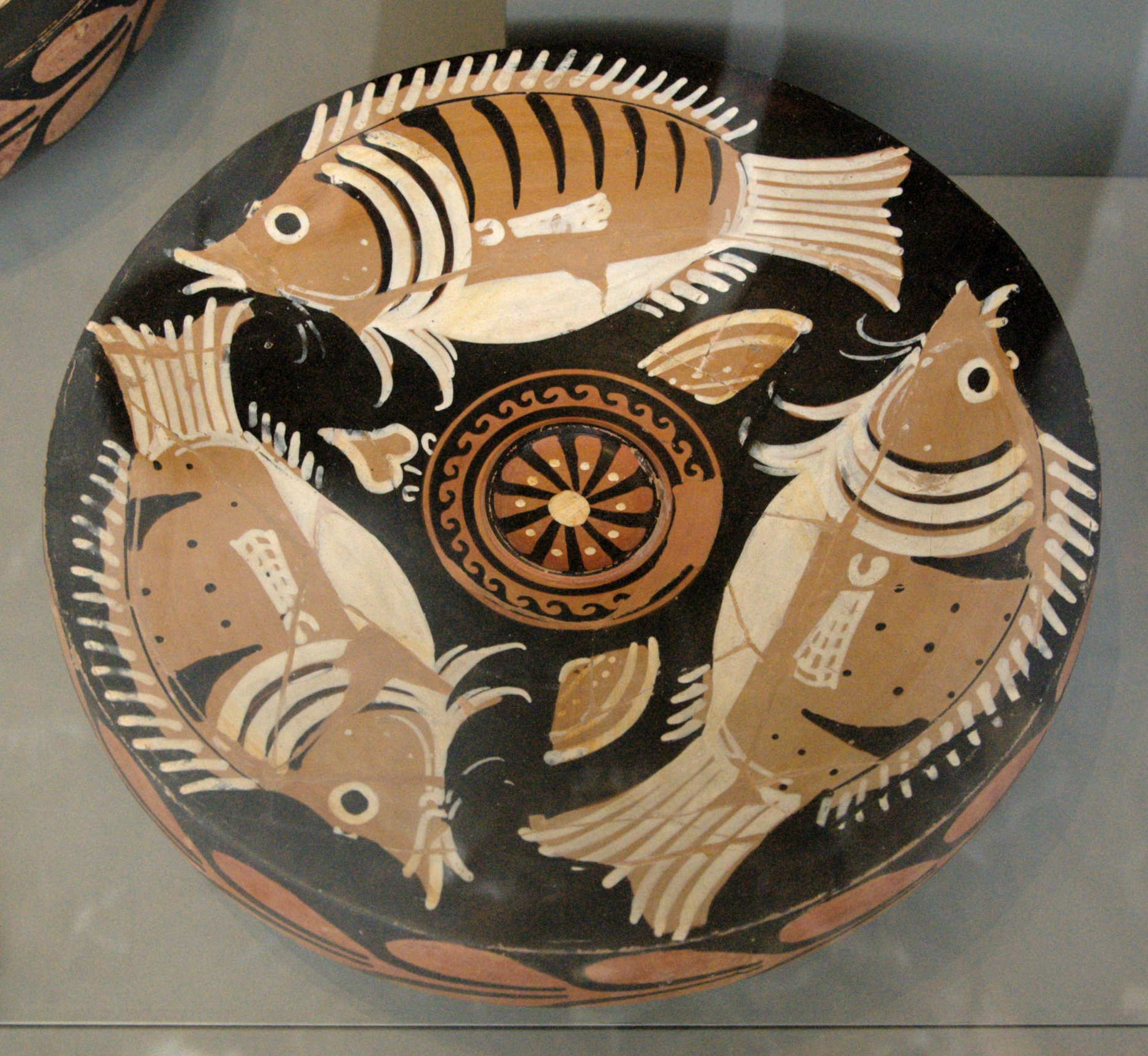
Fish Plate (1984.57)

Among the discovered items, apart from the significant Heracles plate, thirteen additional smaller plates are part of the collection. Four of these are termed women's head plates, ranging in diameter from 19 to 20 centimeters and attributed to the Armidale painter. These female heads correspond to those found on the skyphoi also credited to the Armidale painter. While three of the plates are almost entirely preserved, one of the plates from the 1991 purchase is only fragmentary.

Nine fish plates complete the collection. They are a type of vase that was commonly used in southern Italy and are attributed to one or more painters from the Darius painter’s circle. These painters are known as the Karlsruhe 66/140 group and it is possible that there is only one painter, the Karlsruhe 66/140 painter. The plates have a diameter of 23.3 to 25 cm and a height of 6.5 to 7.4 cm (with preserved feet). Three large aquatic animals are depicted on each plate, with each occupying roughly a third of the surface area. The two-banded bream appears most frequently in the depictions, appearing on two of the plates. The remaining plate showcases a black-banded bream. The depictions also feature additional aquatic life such as horned mussels, squid, sea bass, and marbled electric rays. Small shells or ivy leaves are commonly placed between the larger depictions.

=== Further fragments ===
A reconstructed woman's head and five fish plates were recovered from subsequent acquisitions in 1991. Six additional fragments were discovered that contained remains of the Xenon genus. Conclusions were drawn based on the shape of the five lip fragments and the sixth fragment, which was located in the space between the pelvis and foot, indicating two different bowl sizes with estimated diameters of approximately 15 and 20 cm. The number of vessels to which the six fragments belong is uncertain. To the best extent that can be determined, the painting on the bowls is purely ornamental.

== Artists ==
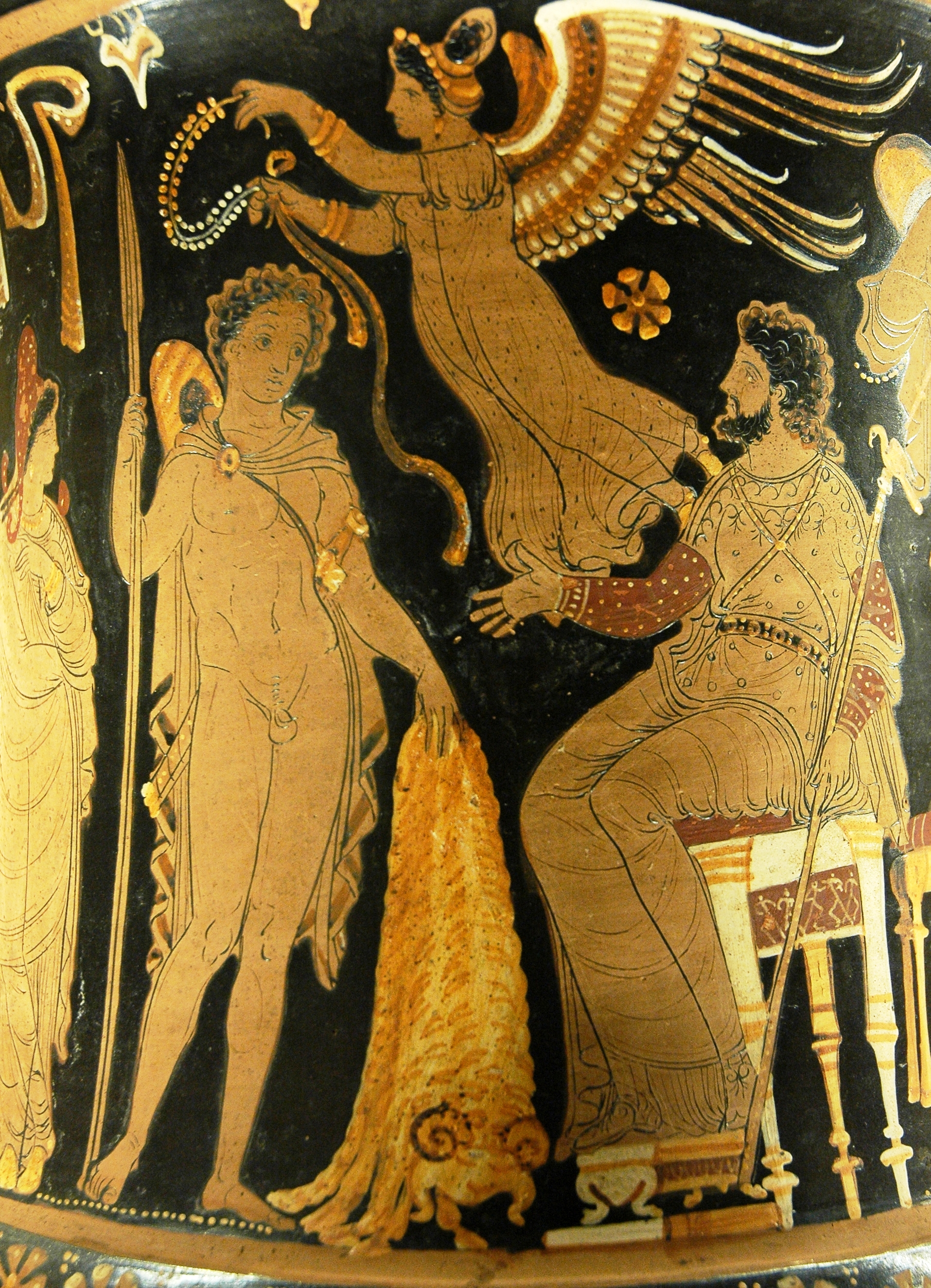
Jason brings the Golden Fleece to Pelias. Apulian crater around 340/330 BC BC, another work by the underworld painter, Louvre .

The painters credited with the works all come from the same setting. While the vases have been dated to around 340 BC, there are chronological differences that can be distinguished. The first painter in order of time was the Varrese painter, a prominent vase painter in Apulia during the mid-4th century BC. Following him were the direct predecessors of the Darius Painter. The painter from Copenhagen 4223 is the closest to the Varrese painter in style. The Darius painter, who was the first late Apulian artist to explore the potential of monumental vessels, follows closely. His work had a significant impact on all Apulian vase painters who succeeded him. Attributed to him or to artists from his immediate and closest circle, most of the pieces in the discovery consist of three vases. The Underworld Painter was the most significant successor, responsible for creating most of the large works found in the graves along with the Darius Painter. The Armidale Painter, possibly identical to the Ganymede Painter, was the last painter represented in the ensemble. He was an expert in small vase shapes, and his works survived up to 600.

A significant number of vases crafted by the artists here have survived. They all worked in a Tarentine workshop with high production numbers. The setup of these large workshops in southern Italy is unclear, despite evidence of several. The works listed here originate from the Darius Underworld workshop, known for producing the finest quality red-figure Apulian vases in this era.
