= Mixing bowl with the exposure of baby Aegisthos =

The mixing bowl with the exposure of baby Aegisthos is an ancient Greek ceramic calyx-krater, a bowl used for mixing wine and water. Manufactured in Taras (modern Taranto) in 330–320 BC, it is thought to be the only known artistic depiction of a lost play by Sophocles, Thyestes at Sikyon. It is currently on display in gallery 215C of the Museum of Fine Arts in Boston, Massachusetts, after having been purchased by them from Fritz Bürki and Son on February 25, 1987.

== Description ==
This krater stands 63.5 cm (25 in) tall and has a diameter at the rim of 58.5 cm (23 in). The style is Apulian red-figure, meaning that it is from the region of southern Italy called Apulia, and that the background and figure details and outlines are painted with a black paint, while the figures themselves are left unpainted. It is in the Ornate style as well, many of which feature pots where figures range all over the surface, as is the case with this one.

There are two distinct sides to the krater. On one side, Dionysus reclines with two satyrs and two maenads around him. On the other side, Thyestes is protesting to king Adrastos the impending exposure (left out in the wilds, presumably to die) of his son Aegisthos, while Adrastos’ wife comforts the baby’s mother, Thyestes’ daughter Pelopeia. Several gods range over all the mortals: Artemis, who is telling Pan to find a goat to nurse the baby; Apollo, a Fury, and a nude youth who is the personification of the city Sikyon, where this is all taking place. Ancient viewers would have been familiar enough with the play to recognize the play and the myth behind the play, which we know through Hyginus’ Fabulae 87-88.

It is a particularly gruesome myth, although none of the gruesomeness is pictured outright here: it is up to the viewer’s familiarity to recognize that Thyestes raped his daughter because Apollo told a prophecy that a son born of that union would kill Thyestes’ brother Atreus, against whom he has a grudge. It is impossible to know now why Atreus, so critical to the plot of the myth, is not depicted on the pot or, presumably, in the play itself. Also unknown are the significance of several objects drawn on the pot: a yellow object in Aegisthos’ hand, which Vermeule recognizes as the hilt of the sword that will later confirm that Aegisthos is the son of Thyestes, although that interpretation of the object is not without criticism. Also drawn is a necklace next to Pelopeia, which might have been important to the play. The play must also differ from the myth in Adrastos being king, which is not commonly cited, and the fact of Thyestes’ presence at the exposure of Aegisthos, which is not in the myth we know. The inclusion of Dionysus on the other side may reference the fact that festivals to Dionysus often featured plays, of which this might have at one time been one.

The krater is attributed to the Darius Painter, for similarity in several stylistic and iconographic elements. Called one of the most literate painters, this pot provides inscriptions labelling several of the important figures, which have been instrumental in identifying this pot with the play Thyestes at Sikyon, even though we don’t have the play itself.
