= Darius Vase =

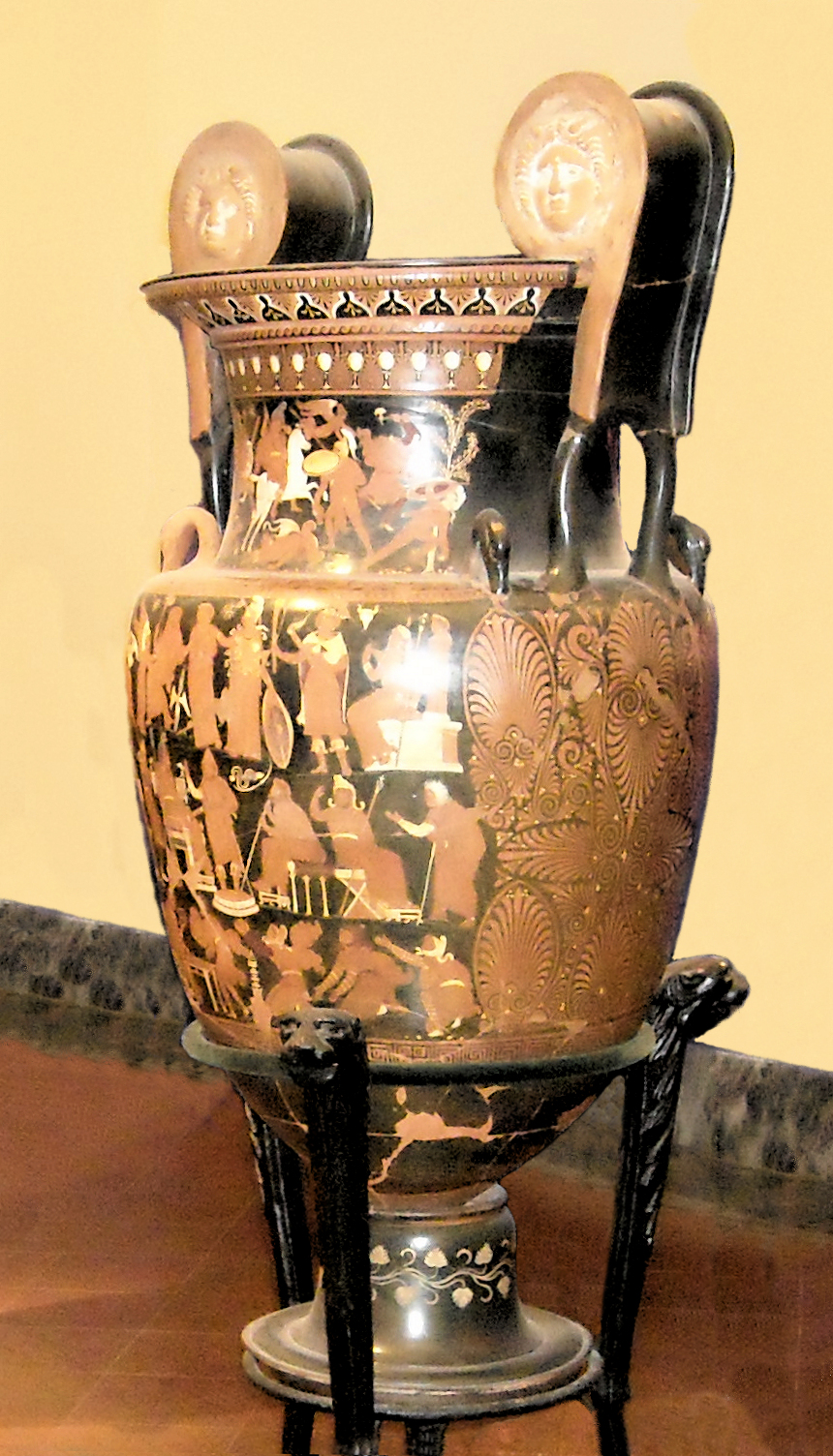
The Darius vase in the Archaeological Museum of Naples (340-320 BCE).

The Darius Vase is a famous vase painted by an anonymous Magna Graecia Apulian vase painter, commonly called the Darius Painter, the most eminent representative at the end of the "Ornate Style" in South Italian red-figure vase painting. The vase was produced between 340 and 320 BCE, probably in a large factory-like workshop in the Greek city of Taranto (ancient Taras), Magna Graecia, well before the fall of Taranto to the Romans in 272 BCE. It is an important work of Apulian vase painting.

The "Darius Vase" was discovered in 1851 near Canosa di Puglia and is now on display at the Museo Archaeologico Nazionale, Naples (H3253). It is a large volute krater, 1.3 meters in height and 1.93 meters in circumference.

The vase contains several inscriptions, some naming individual figures, but there are also collective names (such as persai – Persians). These inscriptions can be seen as "tituli". All available space on the vase is used for figural depictions, arranged in two or three registers. Some individual zones are structured by opulent ornamental friezes. The Darius Painter is considered the first painter to have fully exploited the possibilities of large-format vase painting. His drawing style is regarded as especially good, particularly in faces, which he often depicts in a three-quarter profile.

== Content of the vase ==
=== Neck of the vase: Combat scenes ===
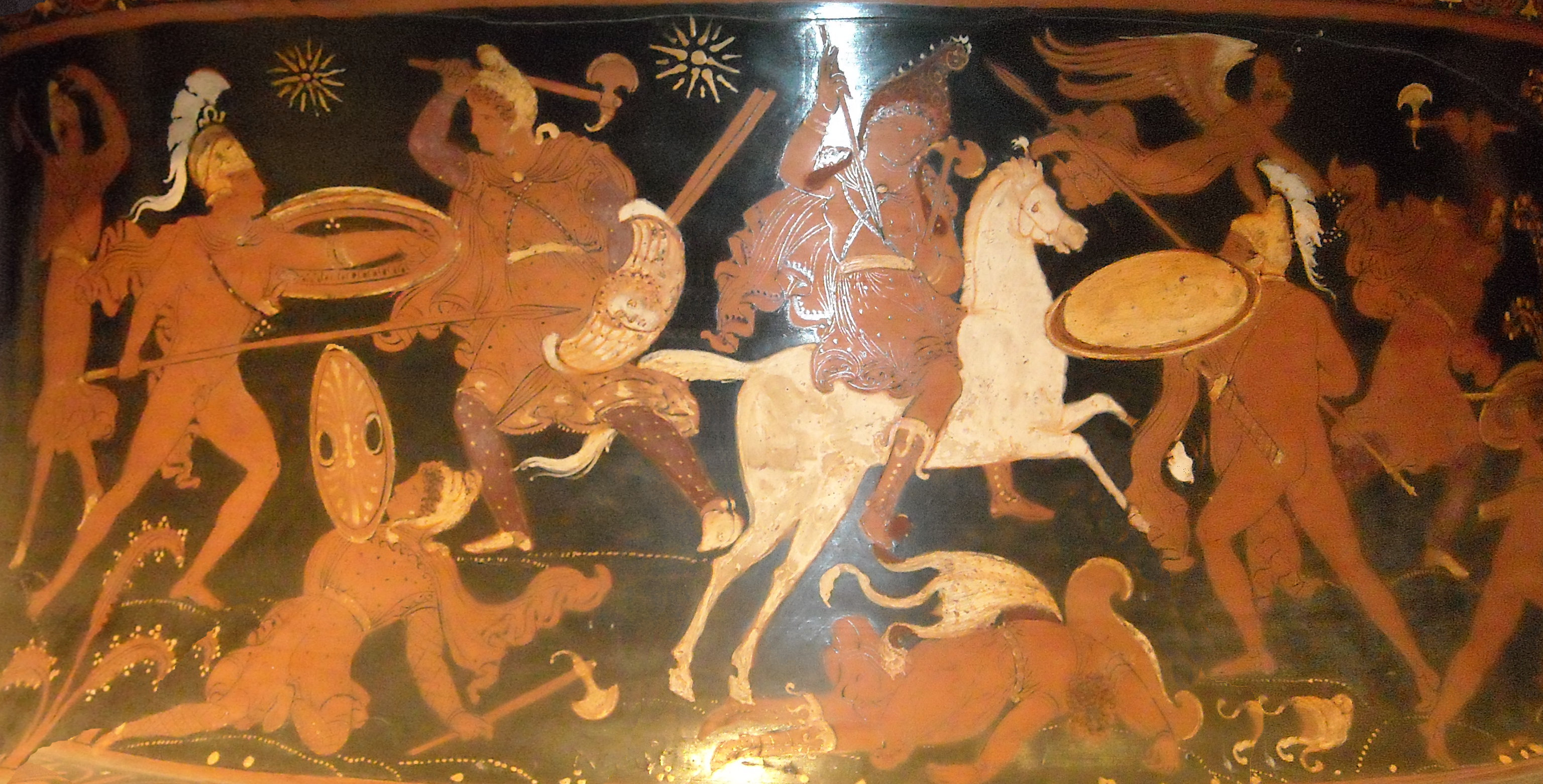
Combat scene between Greeks and Persians, on the neck of the vase.

The neck of the vase shows combat scenes between the Greeks and the Persians. It is generally thought that these scenes represents the combats between Alexander the Great and Darius III, rather than the earlier combats of the troops of Darius the Great during his First Persian invasion of Greece.

=== Top tier: Greek gods ===
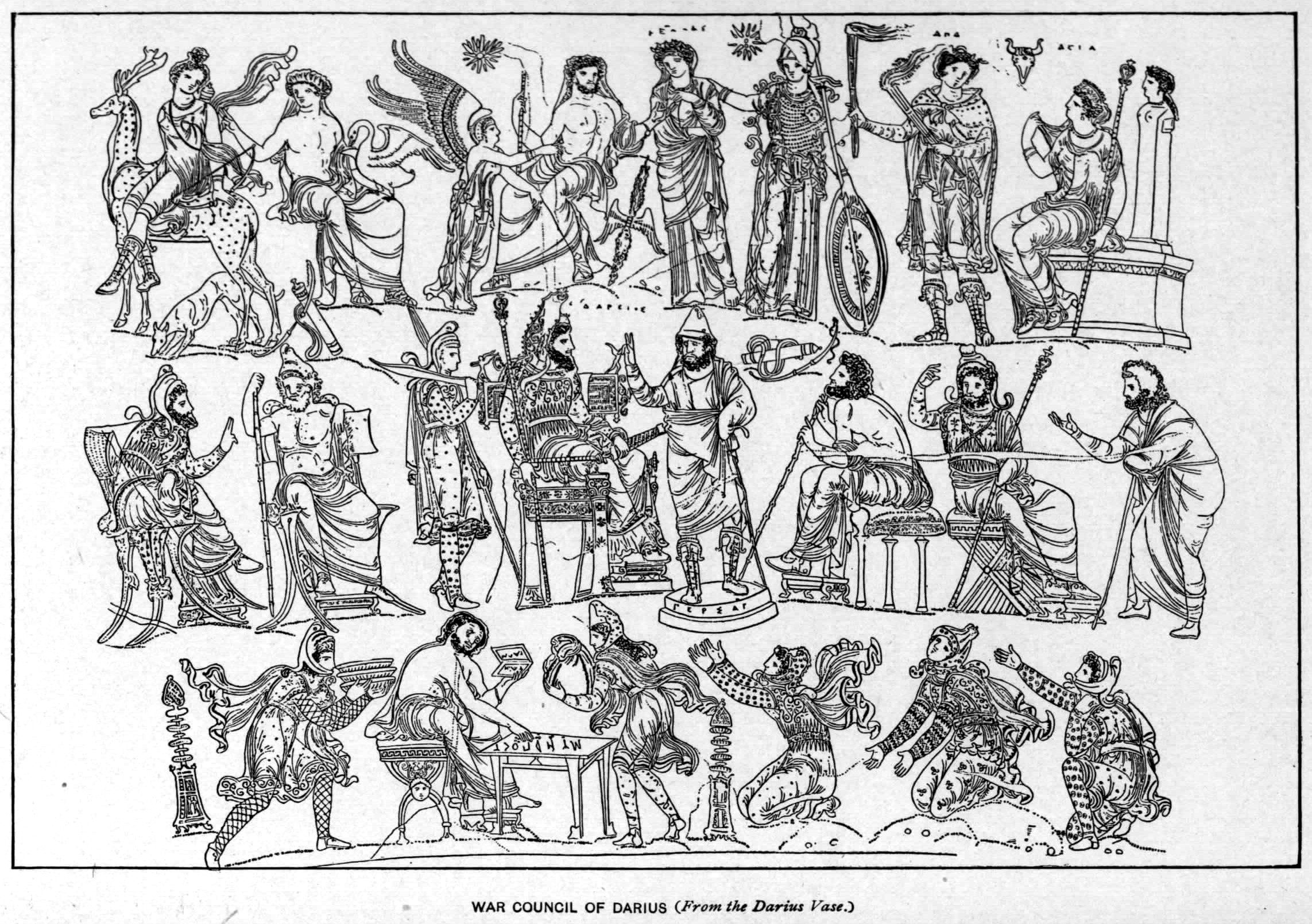
The three tiers on the body of the vase: Greeks gods, War Council of Darius, and tax collection.

Above Darius stands a line of Greek Gods: Artemis riding a stag, Apollo seated holding a swan, Aphrodite together with Eros, Zeus holding a winged thunderbolt, Hellas standing, Athena holding a shield, Apate holding two torches, Asia seated on an altar, next to a pillar holding a head (possibly of xoanon).

=== Middle tier: Darius and his court ===
Darius III is shown seated, wearing a long, ornate, sleeved robe and a high Persian hat. A bodyguard stands behind him, as Darius is listening to an allegory of the Persian people, enjoining him not to attack the Greeks. Darius could also be simply listening to a messenger. Xerxes I, still a Prince, is said to be represented, second from right. The scene of the audience given by an Achaemenid ruler seems to have been quite conventional, and also appears in a similar fashion in the frieze on the tomb of Lycian ruler Arbinas.

=== Bottom tier: tax collection ===
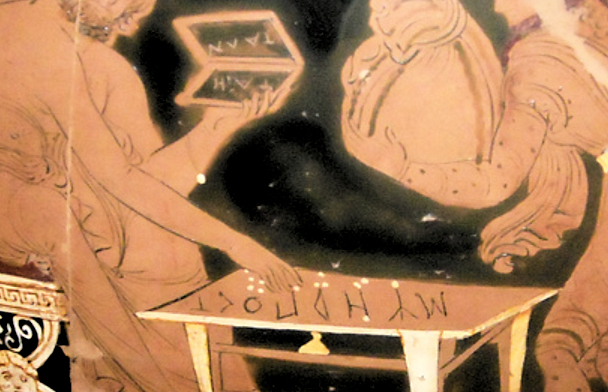
Calculations of the Tax Collector on his abacus.

A tax collector, the Royal Treasurer, is seen receiving payments by various conquered nations, whose representatives crouch before him. On a table lays a calculating table (a reckoning board or abax, used for complicated calculations), with a number of small pebbles or counters in front of the Greek numerals for calculating large numbers. The symbol "O" appears in the calculation table, a Boeotian symbol for the obol, or small unit. The use of pebbles on a board to make calculations is illustrated down to modern times by the fact that calx is "pebble" in Latin, which is the etymological root for the word "calculation".

The board contains the letters M (= 10.000), Ψ (Boeotian for 1.000), H (= 100), Δ (= 10) and (=5, or possibly the unit symbol for the Drachma). White pebbles are added next to each letter in order to give the number of each quantity unit. Next to them appear the former symbols used to represent the Greek coins: Obol (Boeotian symbol O, 1/6 of a Drachma), half an Obol (С) and a quarter of an Obol (T). These symbols resemble those found in the Salamis abacus. The number here shown is probably 1741 and 4/6 Drachms. The tax collector also holds an open diptych (two-leaved wax tablet) in which can be read the letters TAΛNTA:H, presumably meaning tal'anta hekaton' ("one hundred talents").

== Influences ==
The Darius vase may have represented a scene from a Greek drama. The depiction of Darius on his name-vase is possibly derived in its details from the Persae of Phrynikos, C. Anti concluded in 1952, and Schmidt 1960 follows him. However Oliver Taplin notes in Pots and Plays, 2007, p. 235-7, the only strong indications of tragic reference are Darius himself and the old man in paidagogos outfit on the plinth inscribed ΠΕΡΣΑΙ, who might be performing the messenger role. Taplin speculates that the iconography of tragedy "could be assimilated into other contexts without danger of confusion", op. cit. p. 237.

== Gallery ==
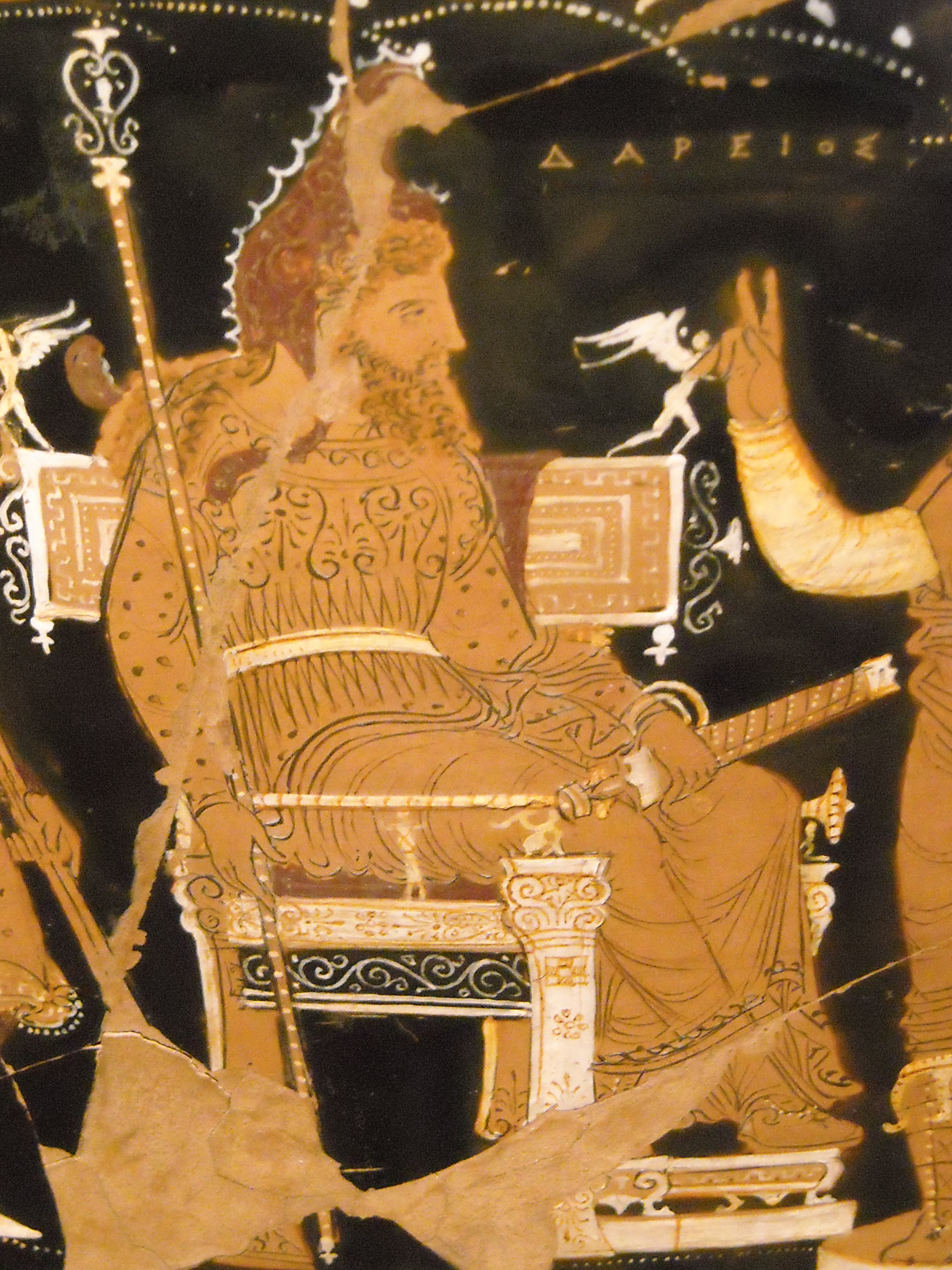
Depiction of Darius III of Persia and its inscription (ΔΑΡΕΙΟΣ, top right) on the "Darius Vase"

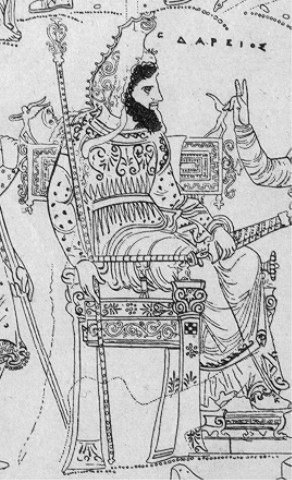
Drawing of Darius on the vase.

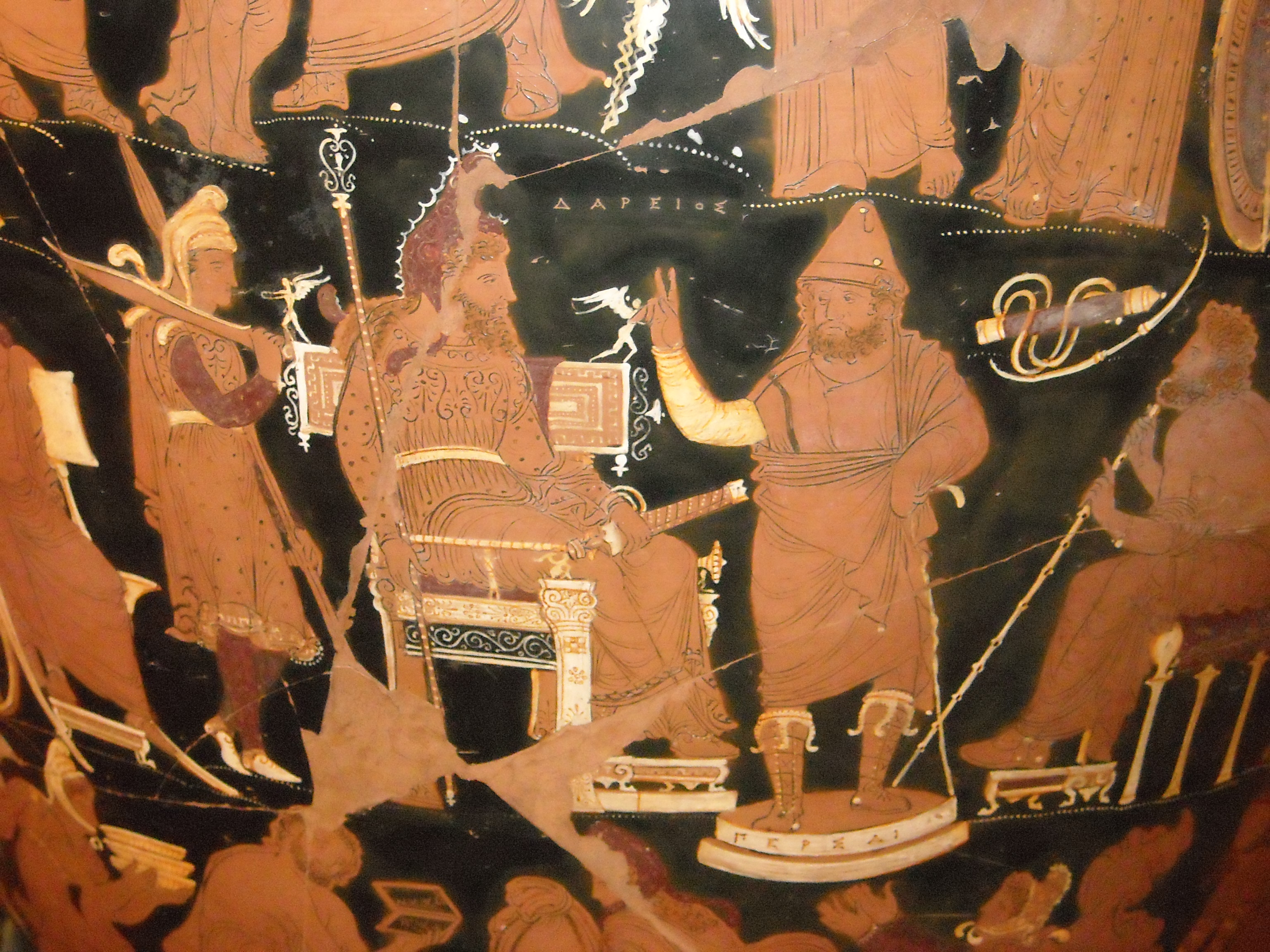
Darius receiving advice from the Persians.

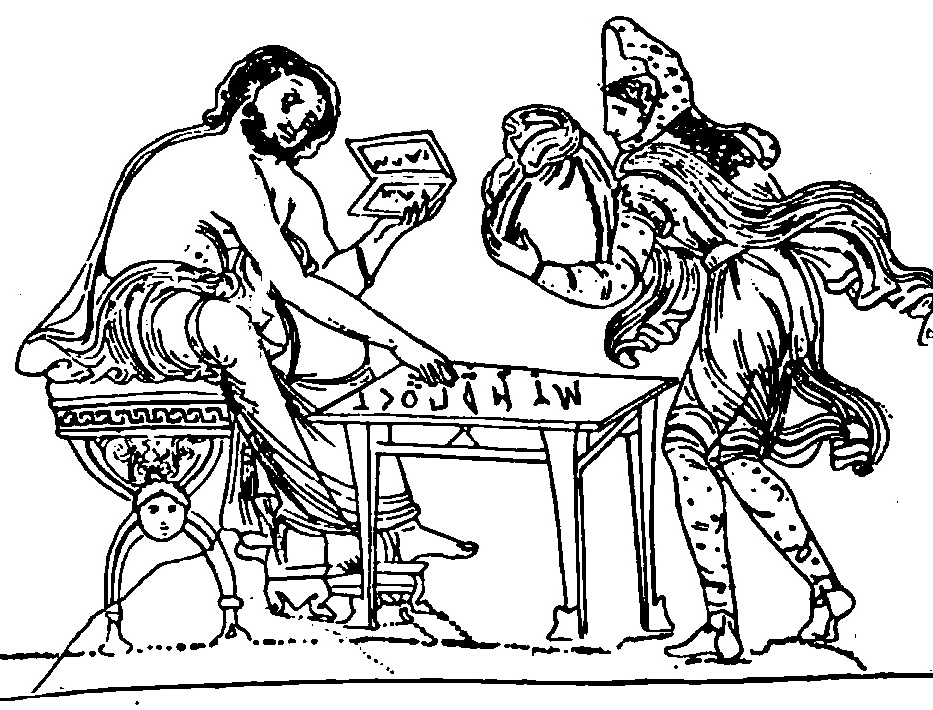
Abax depicted on the Darius vase

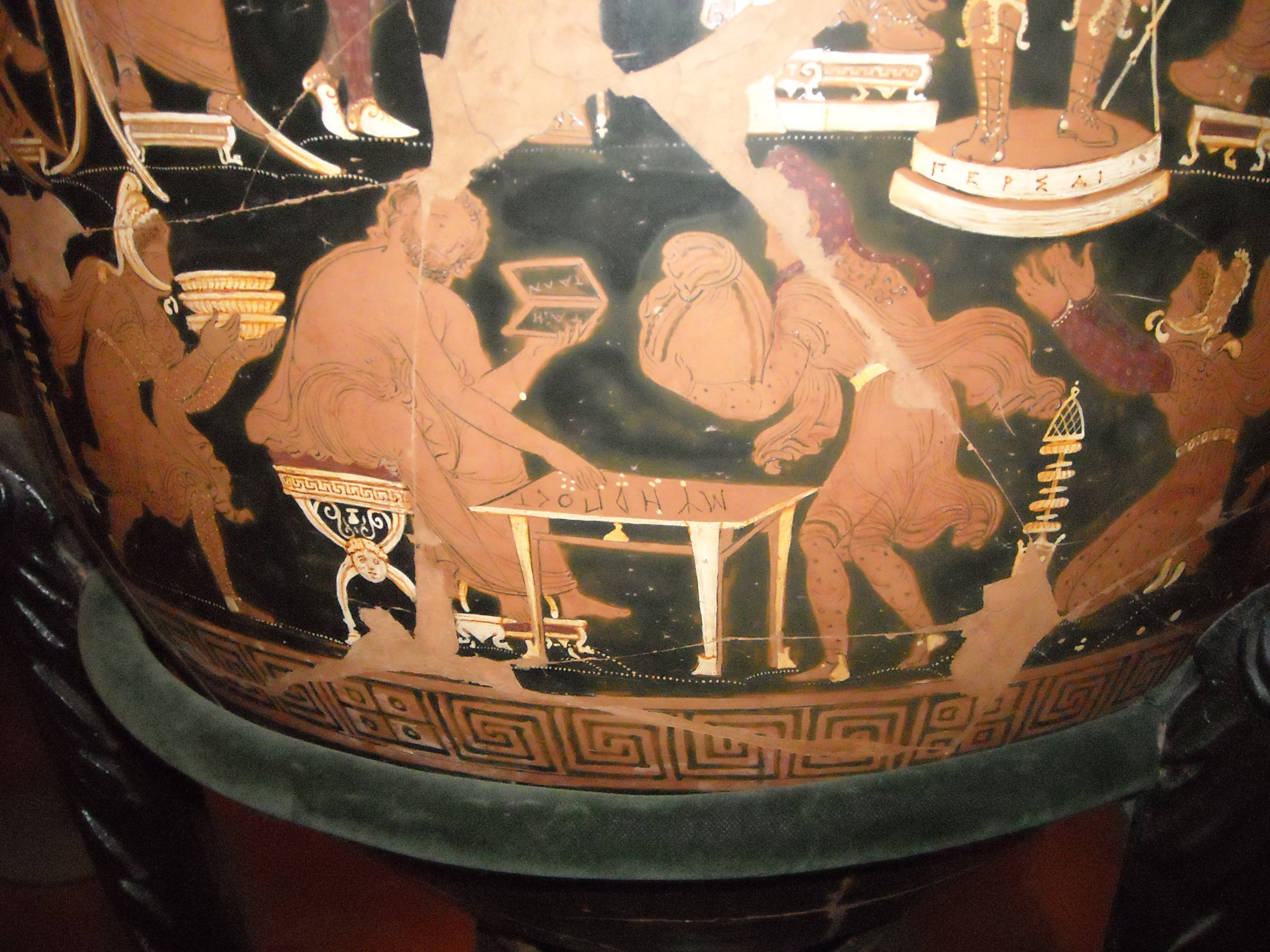
The Tax collector scene.

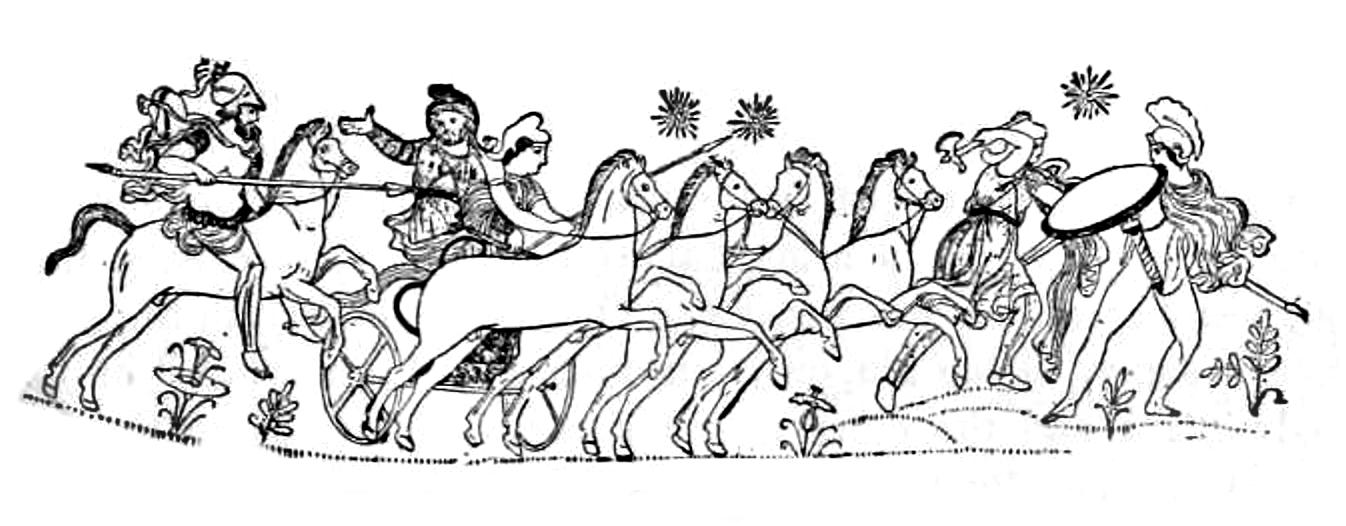
Battle between Greeks and Persians, on the reverse of the Darius Vase.

== See also ==
- Apulian vase painting

== Sources ==
- Margot Schmidt. Der Dareiosmaler und sein Umkreis: Untersuchen zur Spätapulischen Vasenmalerei, Munich: Aschendorff, 1960.
- Jean-Marc Moret. L'Ilioupersis dans la céramique italiote, les mythes et leur expression figurée au IVe siècle, Institut Suisse de Rome, 1975.
- Thomas Morard, Horizontalité et verticalité. Le bandeau humain et le bandeau divin chez le Peintre de Darius, Mainz, von Zabern, 2009.
- Alexandre Cambitoglou, Arthur Dale Trendall. The Red-figured Vases of Apulia, II, Late Apulian, Oxford, 1982: p. 482-522. Bibliography.
- Christian Aellen, Alexandre Cambitoglou, Jacques Chamay. Le peintre de Darius et son milieu, Vases grecs d'Italie Méridionale, Hellas et Roma, Genf 1986.
- Arthur Dale Trendall. Rotfigurige Vasen aus Unteritalien und Sizilien. Ein Handbuch. von Zabern, Mainz 1991 (Kulturgeschichte der Antiken Welt Vol. 47), ISBN 3-8053-1111-7 (p. 85-177).
- Françoise-Hélène Massa-Pairault. Le Peintre de Darius et l'actualité. De la Macédoine à la Grande Grèce, in L'incidenza dell'Antico II: studi in memore di Ettore Lepore, Napoli, 1996.
- Rolf Hurschmann. Dareios-Maler, in Der Neue Pauly Vol. 3 (1997), col. 324.
- Claude Pouzadoux, Guerre et paix en Peucétie à l'époque d'Alexandre le Molosse (notes sur quelques vases du Peintre de Darius), in Le Canal d'Otrante et la Méditerranée antique et médiévale, colloque organisée à l'Université de Paris X - Nanterre (20-21 novembre 2000), Edipuglia, Bari, 2005.
