= Varrese Painter =

Ancient Greek vase painter

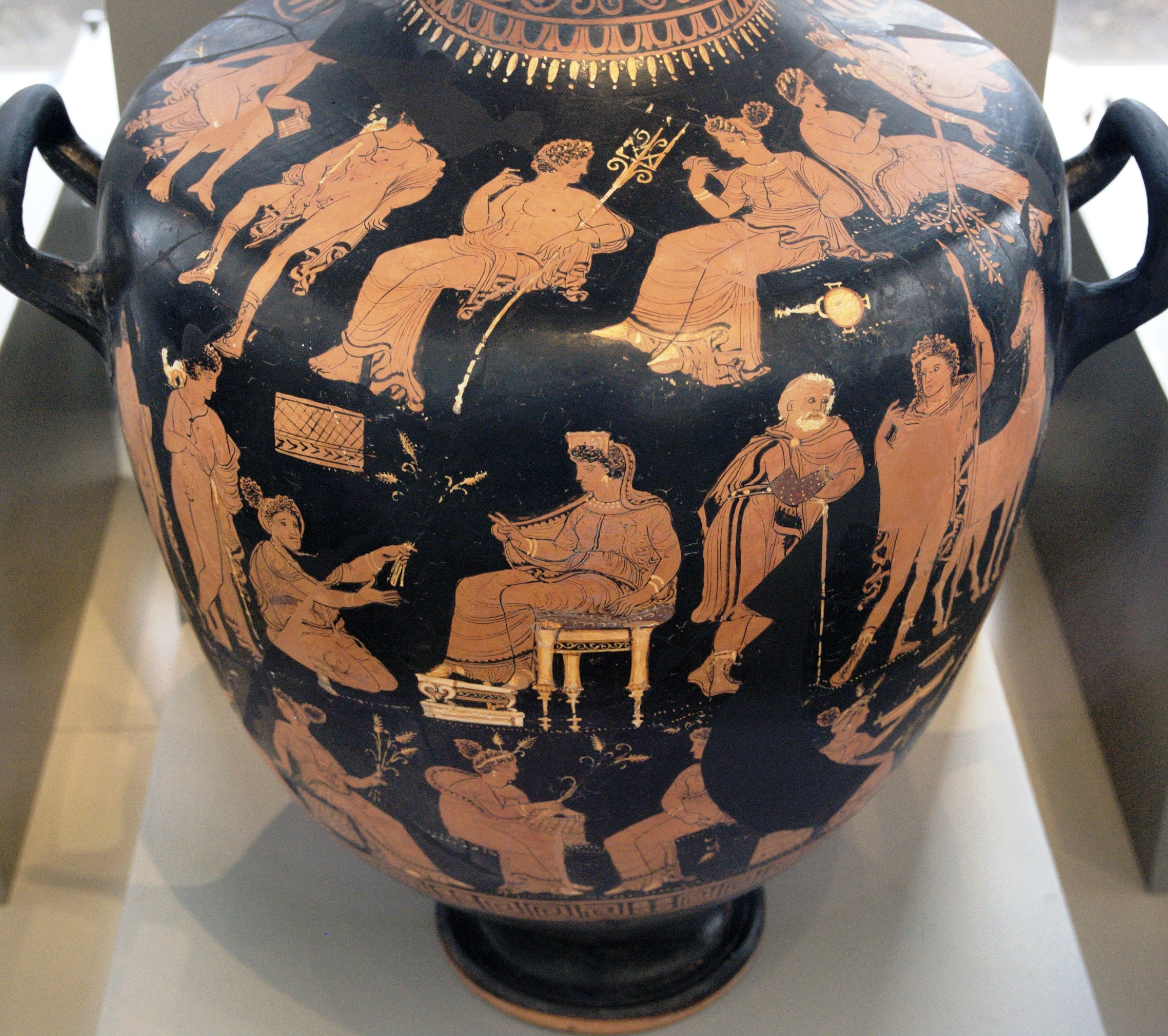
So-called Eleusina hydria, c. 340 BC. Berlin, Antikensammlung.

The Varrese Painter was an Apulian red-figure vase painter. His works are dated to the middle of the 4th century BC.

His conventional name is derived from the Varrese hypogeum (a rock-cut grave complex) at Canosa di Puglia, which contained several vases painted by him. In total, over 200 known vases are attributed to him. Scholars consider him one of the most important representatives of his period. His influence extended beyond his immediate surroundings and beyond his own phase of activity, as far as the immediate predecessors of the Darius Painter. A quarter of the vases attributed to him, including hydriai, nestorids, loutrophoroi and a large oenochoe are of considerable size. The rest if his work is mainly on bell kraters and pelikes. Although he belongs to the tradition of the Ornate Style, his smaller vessels are often stylistically close to the Plain Style.

His pictorial repertoire is characterised by frequently repeated motifs. Four basic motifs have been identified:

- A naked youth, either standing with one arm covered by a garment, or seated on a folded cloth;
- A standing female figure, both legs clearly visible under her garment, one placed behind the other;
- A clothed woman, one of her feet standing on a higher level than the other, her upper body bent towards that foot, one arm resting on her thigh;
- A seated woman, placing one leg in front of the other.

The Varrese Painter's figures appear serious and sombre, and their mouths are small and turned downwards. His women often wear their hair in a knot held by a white band. On his larger vases, especially when depicting funerary naiskoi, he makes copious use of additional colours. His large vessels usually show mythological scenes. His smaller vases usually bear compositions of two or three figures on both sides, often including cloaked youths on the back.

The Varrese Painter's workshop also employed the Wolfenbüttel Painter; his influence has been noted not only on the predecessors of the Darius Painter, but also on the Ginosa Painter, the Painter of Bari 12061, the Metope Painter, the Painter of Louvre MNB 1148 and the Chamay Painter.

== Bibliography ==
- Arthur Dale Trendall. Rotfigurige Vasen aus Unteritalien und Sizilien. Ein Handbuch. von Zabern, Mainz 1991 (Kulturgeschichte der Antiken Welt Vol. 47), esp. p. 97-101 ISBN 3-8053-1111-7.
