= Underworld Painter =

Ancient Greek vase painter

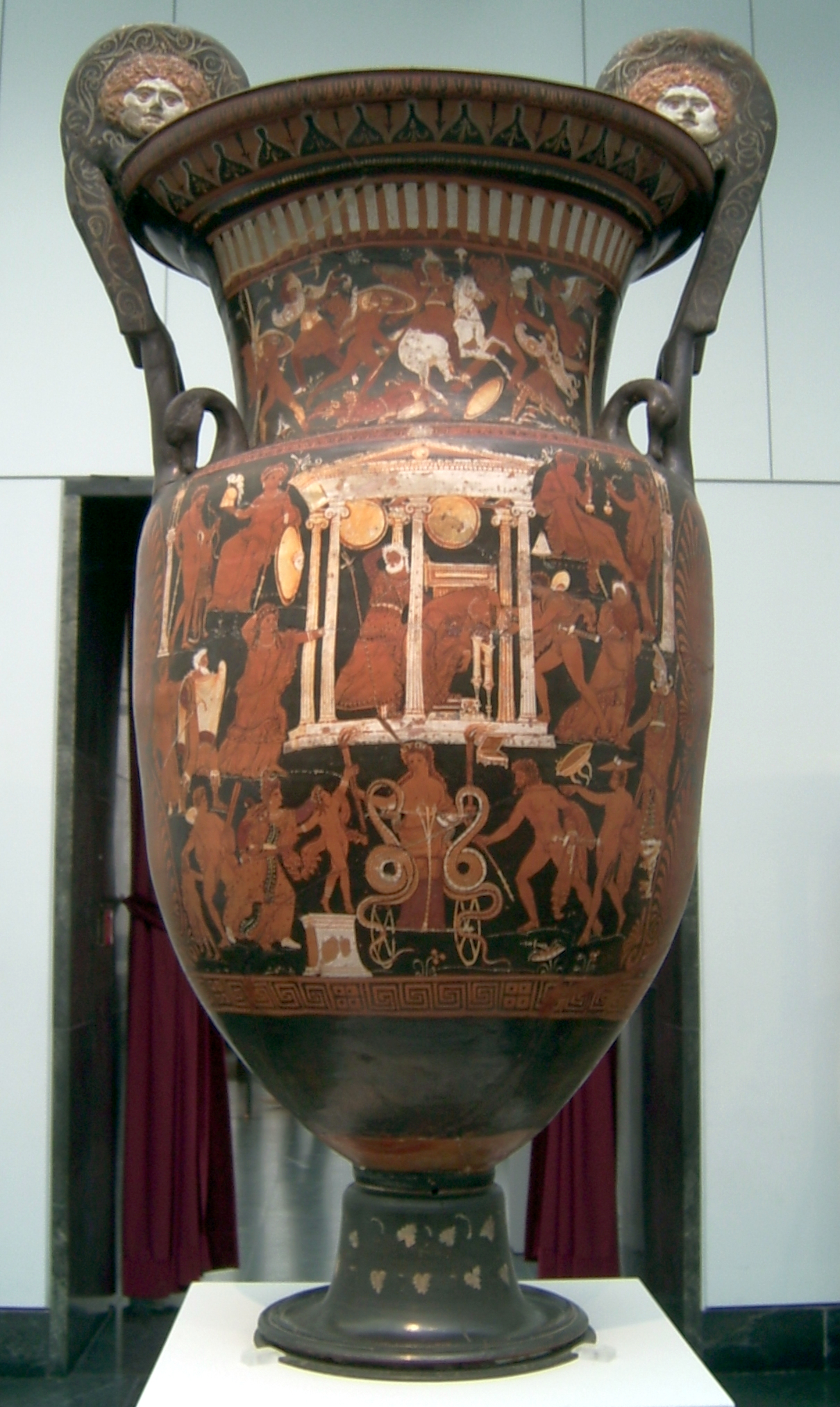
Apulian vase by Underworld Painter, Staatliche Antikensammlungen

The Underworld Painter was an ancient Greek Apulian vase painter whose works date to the second half of the 4th century BC.

== Career ==
The Underworld Painter is the successor of the Darius Painter, in whose workshop he began his career and where he worked with other influential craftsmen. This was a large factory-like workshop, probably at Taras. He most frequently depicted theatrical scenes, especially ones from the Classical tragedies by Euripides, and mythological themes.

== Works ==
One of his works shows Hades and Persephone in her palace in the underworld. The compositions and the mythological content are close to those of the Darius Painter, and the influences can be seen in his depictions of robes and faces. Other subjects include Hades kidnapped Persephone, Eos kidnapped Cephalus, and Castor and Pollux abducting the daughters of Leucippus. In the first two vases he is quite free in his presentation, he distributed the figures on different levels and separates them by tendrils friezes. The third vase is another thematically appropriate image, which is unique in the vase painting is one of its kind: Castor and Pollux fight against the sons of Aphareus. His early work has influenced the later artists Painter of Louvre MNB 1148.

== Style ==
The Underworld Painter often exaggerated with decoration, so that the vases are a little overweight. In addition, he sometimes had problems with the representation of faces, so that its people appear grumpy. He strength was with the muscles naked men, which is depicted as taut and body stressing. This is reminiscent of Hellenistic sculptures. However, his painted legs are often quite thin. He attached great importance to some details. He carefully distinguished hair and patterned clothes. The Underworld Painter in his repertoire is less original than the Darius Painter, but he also shows some rarely shown Melanippe stories like the myth of two plays of Euripides. This story has so far not been found on any other vase. Also known from the Berlin Collection of Classical Antiquities is the Gigantomachy krater, the Priamiden krater and the krater of Persephone). The late work attributed to the artist is seen quite critically and shows a rapid decrease in the skill and quality. It is thought that it was no longer the work of the Underworld Painter, but the other painters of his workshop.

== Bibliography ==
- Arthur Dale Trendall. Red-figure vases of South Italy and Sicily. A handbook. Philip of Saverne, Mainz, 1991 (Cultural History of the Ancient World Vol 47), esp. p. 115-118 ISBN 3-8053-1111-7.
