= Darius Painter =

Apulian vase painter

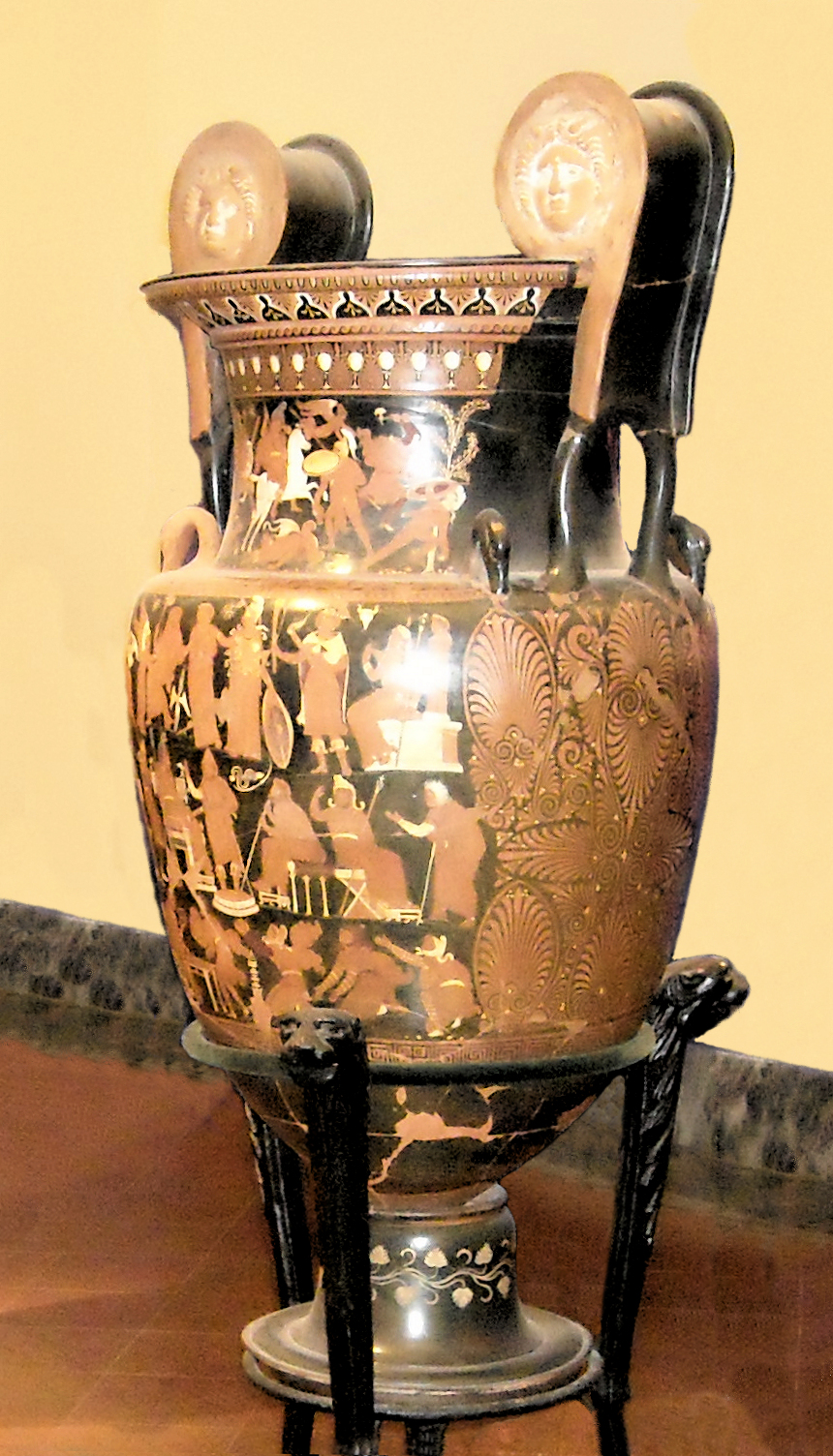
The Darius Vase in the Archaeological Museum of Naples.

The Darius Painter was an Apulian vase painter and the most eminent representative at the end of the "Ornate Style" in South Italian red-figure vase painting in Magna Graecia. His works were produced between 340 and 320 BC.

The Darius Painter's conventional name is derived from his name vase, the "Darius Vase", which was discovered in 1851 near Canosa di Puglia and now on display at the Museo Archaeologico Nazionale, Naples (H3253). Many of his works, mostly volute kraters, amphorae and loutrophoroi, are of large dimensions. He most frequently depicted theatrical scenes, especially ones from the Classical tragedies by Euripides, and mythological themes. A number of mythological motifs not represented in surviving literary texts are known exclusively from his vases. On other shapes, especially pelikes, he also painted as wedding scenes, erotes, women, and dionysiac motifs. In contrast to other contemporary painters, sepulchral scenes (naiskos vases) by him are rare; where such motifs occur, they are virtually always on the back of the vessel. Some of his paintings, like those on the Darius Vase itself, show historical subjects.

One of the most striking features of his work is the frequent use of inscriptions. He does not limit these to the normal practice of naming individual figures, but also uses them thematically (such as persai – Persians). To some extent these inscriptions can be seen as "titles". He also tends to use all available space on a vase for figural depictions, often arranged in two or three registers. Sometimes, the individual zones are structured by opulent ornamental friezes. The Darius Painter is considered the first painter to have fully exploited the possibilities of large-format vase painting. His drawing style is reputed to be especially good, particular as regards faces, which he often depicts in a three-quarter profile.

The Darius Painter worked in a large factory-like workshop, probably at Taras. It is possible that he was the owner or foreman of his workshop. Many vase-paintings are so close to his style, though not by his hand, that they are attributed to his workshop. He was the last important vase-painter in Apulia; Apulian vase painting rapidly declined in quality in the third century. Stylistically, he follows after the Varrese Painter and his group (e.g. the Painter of Copenhagen 4223), but outdoes their achievements. Contemporaries of his that did not simply produce mass wares include the Perrone Painter and the Phrixos Painter. His most important stylistic successor was the Underworld Painter. Arthur Dale Trendall, a key authority on South Italian vase painting, described the Darius Painter as the most important painter of mythological scenes within the total of the South Italian development.

== Gallery ==
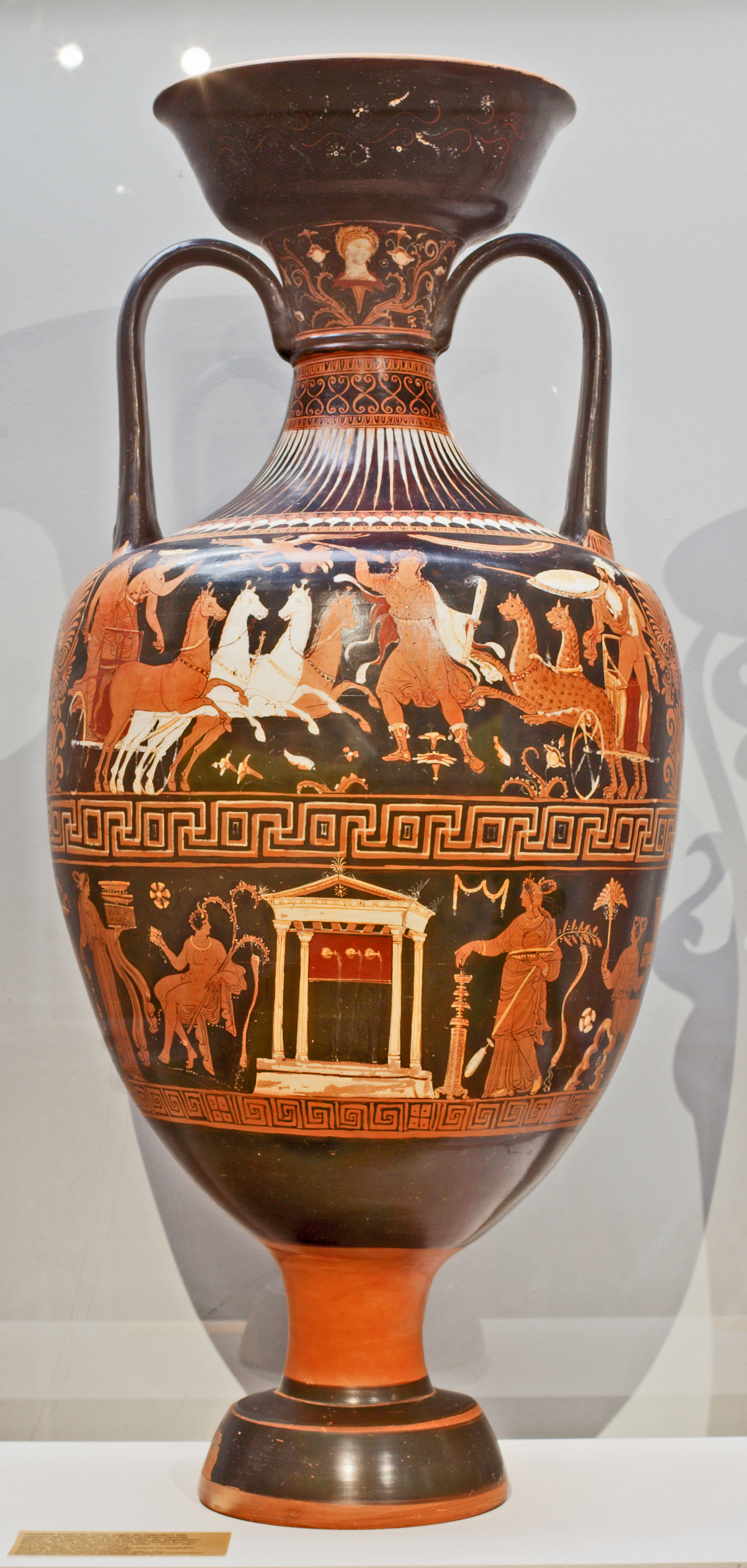
Apulian Amphora, 350 B.C.

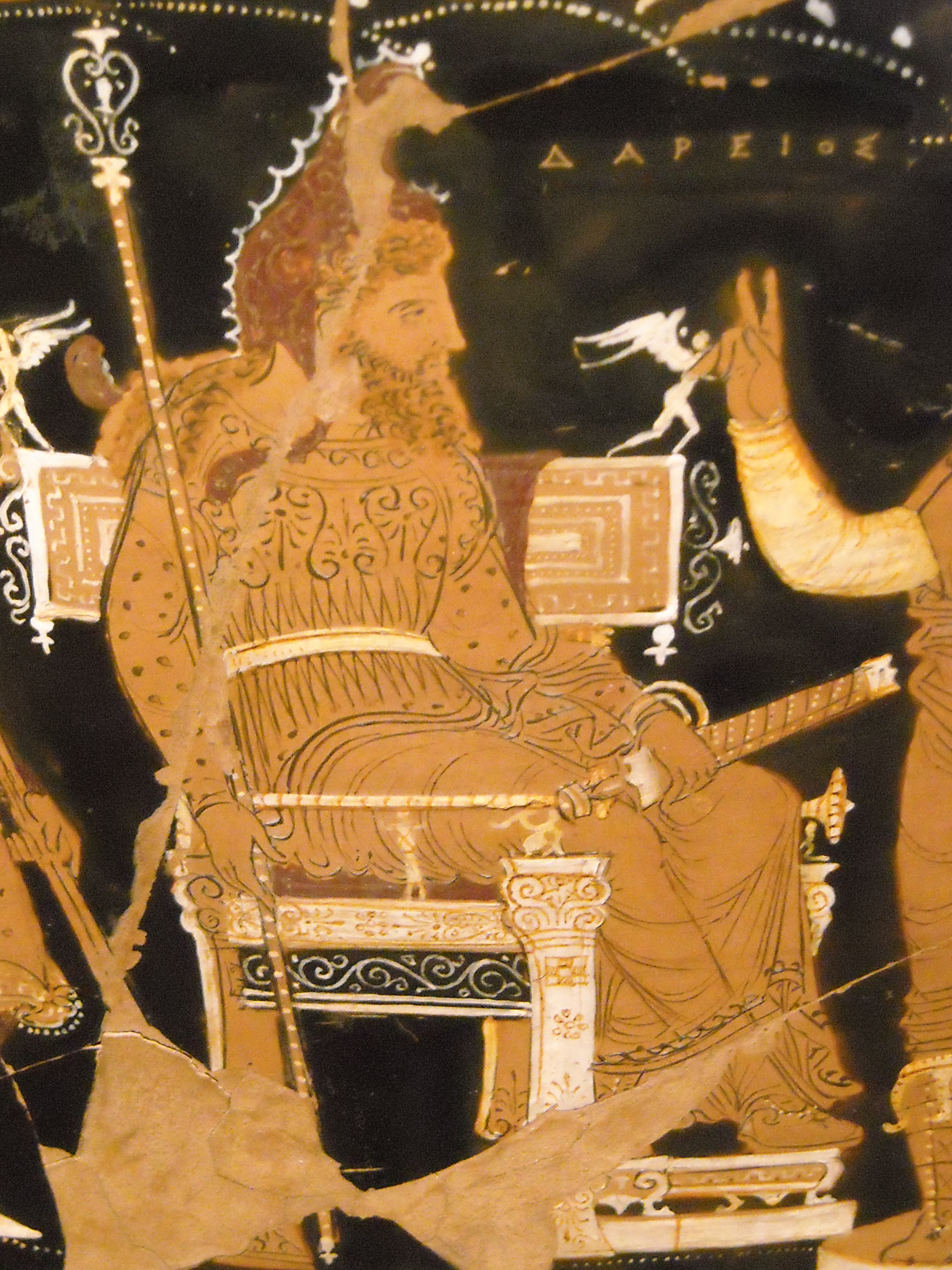
Drawing of the depiction of Darius the Great and its inscription (ΔΑΡΕΙΟΣ, top right) on the "Darius Vase"

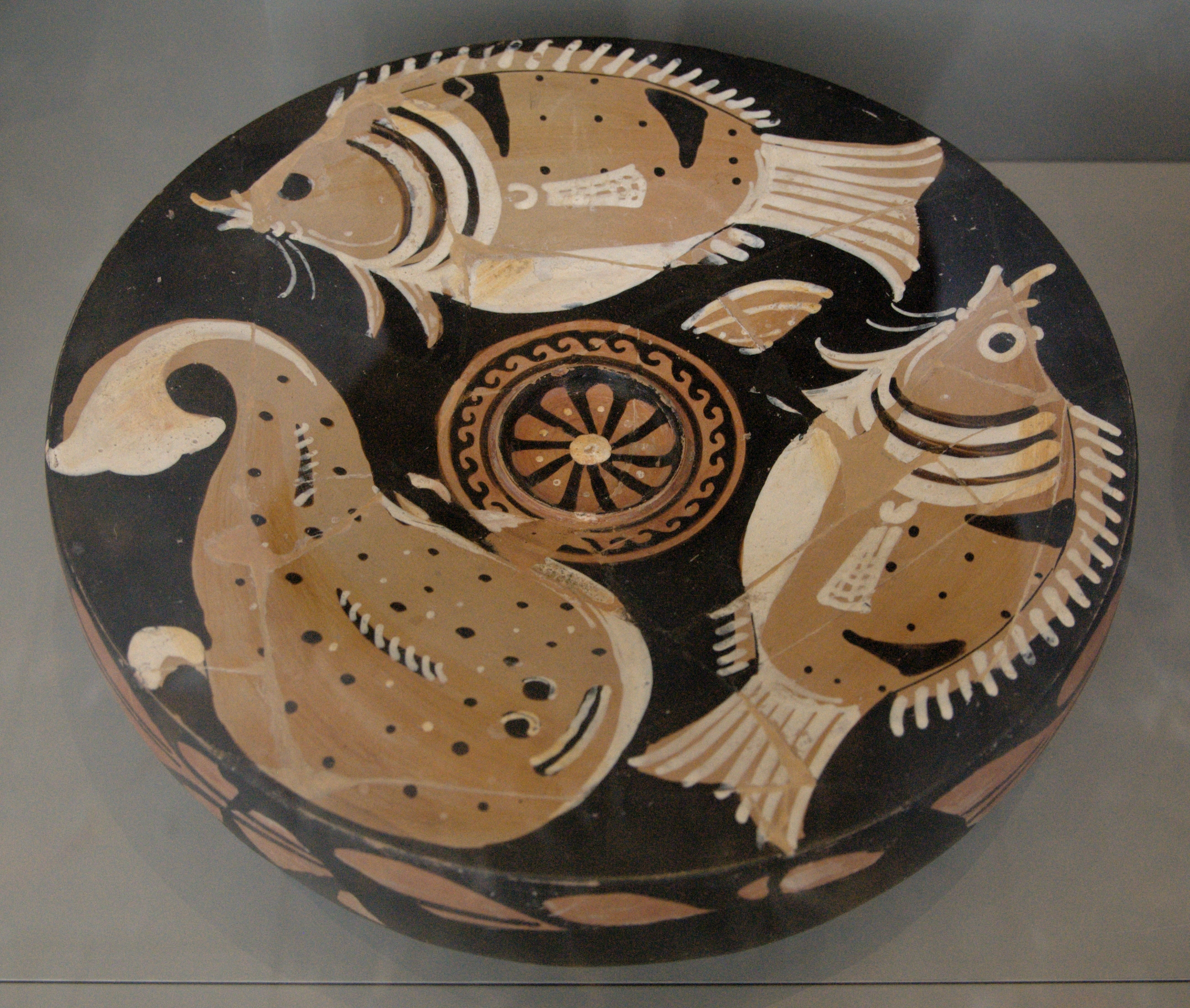
Fish Plate from the Darius Painter's school (Berlin, Antikensammlung)

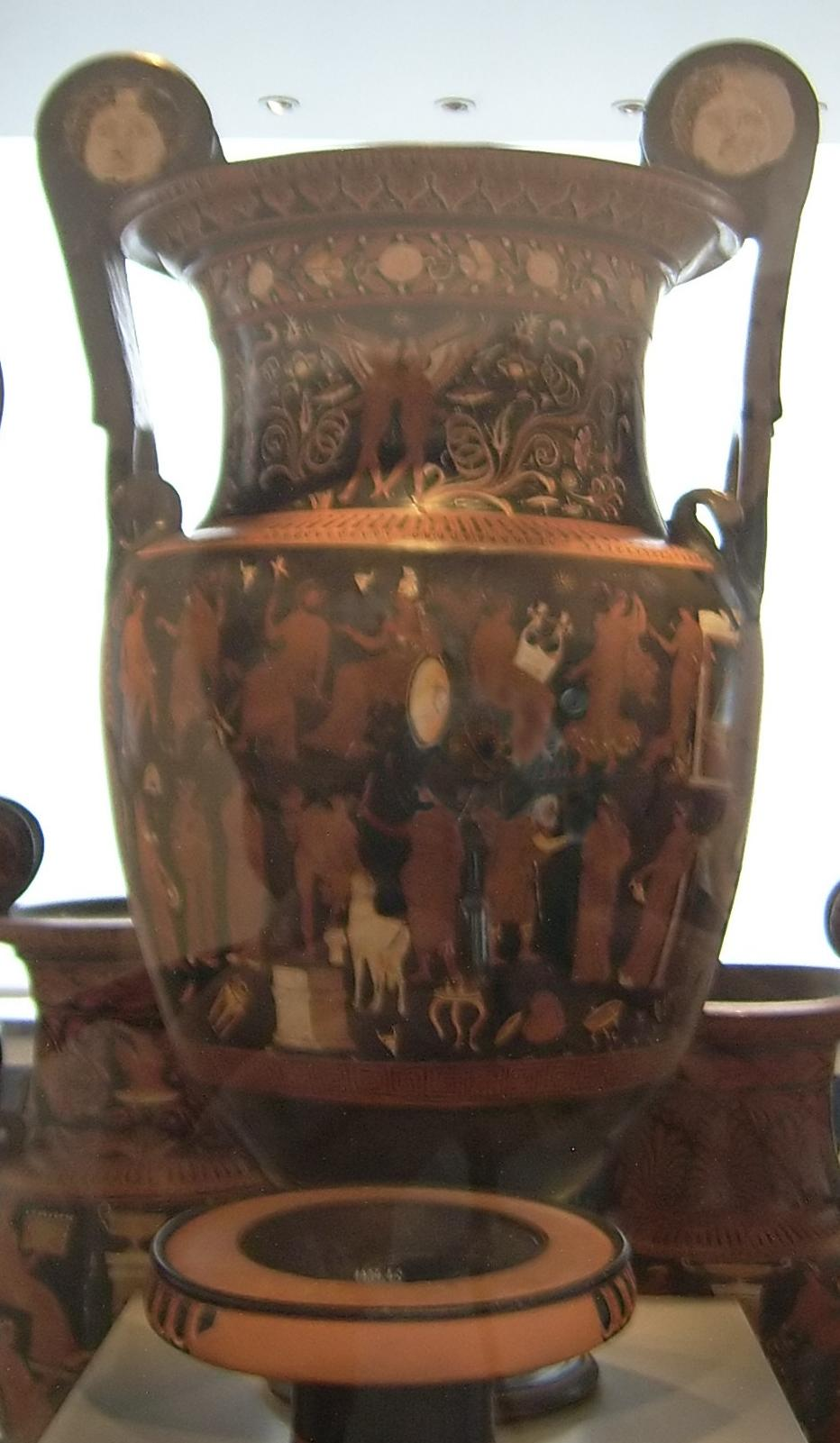
Phrixos krater (Berlin, Antikensammlung)

== Sources ==
- Margot Schmidt. Der Dareiosmaler und sein Umkreis: Untersuchen zur Spätapulischen Vasenmalerei, Munich: Aschendorff, 1960.
- Jean-Marc Moret. L'Ilioupersis dans la céramique italiote, les mythes et leur expression figurée au IVe siècle, Institut Suisse de Rome, 1975.
- Thomas Morard, Horizontalité et verticalité. Le bandeau humain et le bandeau divin chez le Peintre de Darius, Mainz, von Zabern, 2009.
- Alexandre Cambitoglou, Arthur Dale Trendall. The Red-figured Vases of Apulia, II, Late Apulian, Oxford, 1982: p. 482–522. Bibliography.
- Christian Aellen, Alexandre Cambitoglou, Jacques Chamay. Le peintre de Darius et son milieu, Vases grecs d'Italie Méridionale, Hellas et Roma, Genf 1986.
- Arthur Dale Trendall. Rotfigurige Vasen aus Unteritalien und Sizilien. Ein Handbuch. von Zabern, Mainz 1991 (Kulturgeschichte der Antiken Welt Vol. 47), ISBN 3-8053-1111-7 (p. 85-177).
- Françoise-Hélène Massa-Pairault. Le Peintre de Darius et l'actualité. De la Macédoine à la Grande Grèce, in L'incidenza dell'Antico II: studi in memore di Ettore Lepore, Napoli, 1996.
- Rolf Hurschmann. Dareios-Maler, in Der Neue Pauly Vol. 3 (1997), col. 324.
- Claude Pouzadoux, Guerre et paix en Peucétie à l'époque d'Alexandre le Molosse (notes sur quelques vases du Peintre de Darius), in Le Canal d'Otrante et la Méditerranée antique et médiévale, colloque organisée à l'Université de Paris X - Nanterre (20-21 novembre 2000), Edipuglia, Bari, 2005.
