= Torlonia Vase =

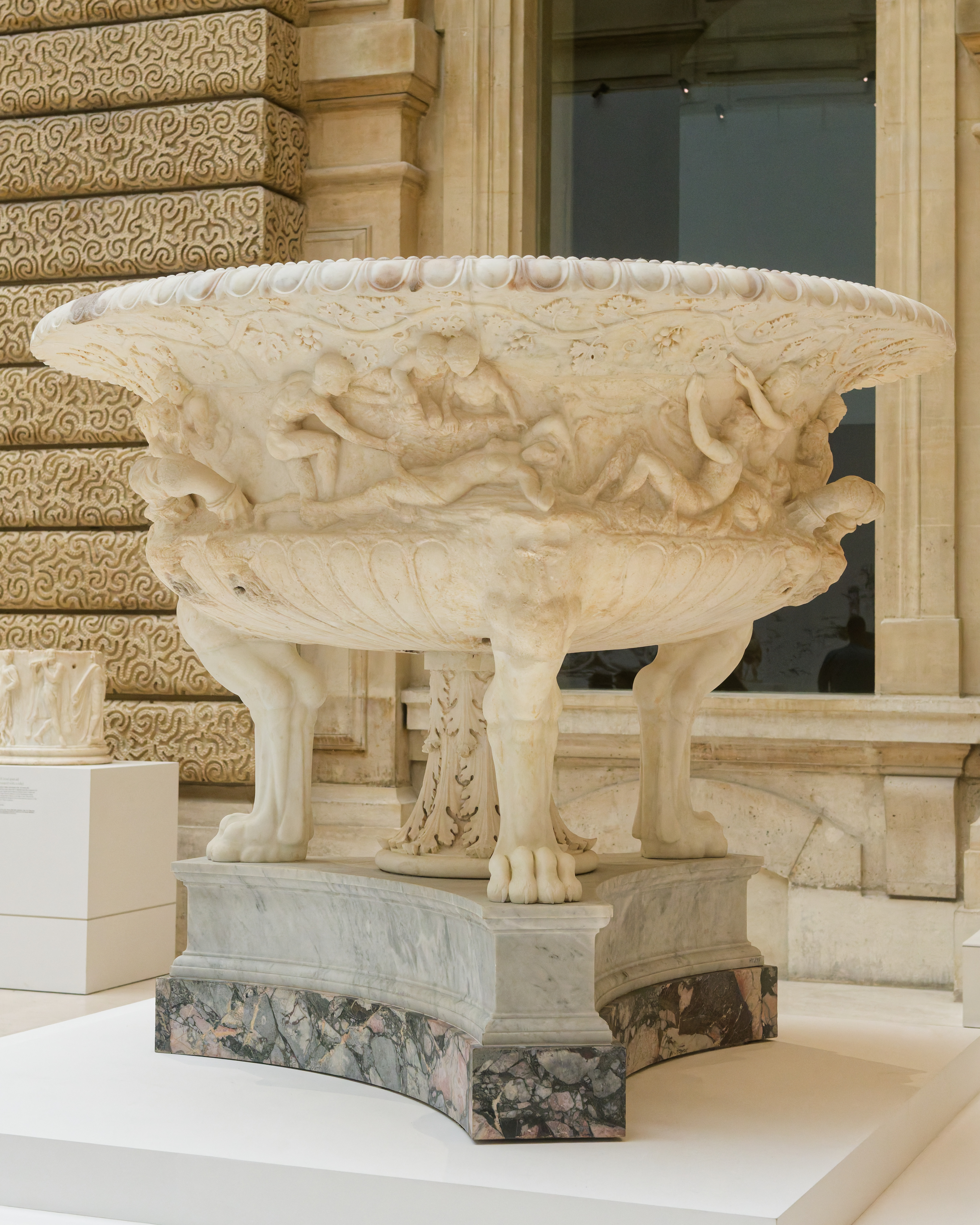
The Torlonia Vase as part of the 2024 exhibition at the Louvre.

The Torlonia Vase or Cesi-Albani-Torlonia Vase is a colossal and celebrated neo-Attic Roman white marble vase, 1.8 m (5 ft 11 in) tall, made in the 1st century BCE, which has passed through several prominent collections of antiquities before coming into the possession of the Princes Torlonia in Rome.

The vase is of calyx krater shape, with a high frieze carved with a Bacchic symposium and an everted rim, standing on a gadrooned base imitative of metalwork. It has three handles, joined to the body with bearded satyrs' masks. It stands on three lion's legs, and a triangular base, all provided for it in the 16th century. For centuries, until the discovery of the Tazza Albani, it was the largest in diameter of known antique vases.

The whereabouts of the vase can be traced through the interest it incited in artists, starting in the 16th century, when the vase was drilled to serve as a garden fountain. The earliest visual documentation is a drawing by Giuliano da Sangallo in the Barberini Codex, Vatican Library, made after 1488, which bears an inscription of its location, at Santa Cecilia in Trastevere, Rome. Amico Aspertini also made a drawing of the vase, but giving a location a santo francesco in tristeuaro. At any rate, by the time it was drawn by Maarten van Heemskerck in the 1530s the vase had been erected in the garden of Cardinal Paolo Emilio Cesi, on the northern slope of the Janiculum near St Peter's Basilica. A statue of Silenus emptying water from a wineskin into the vase, which had been drilled for use as a fountain, was associated with it. Ulisse Aldrovandi described it in a new, central position in the Cesi garden in 1550, with the Silenus standing inside the bowl of the vase; this revision was probably carried out for Cardinal Francesco Cesi. The Flemish artist Pieter Perret created an engraving of the Fountain with Silenus in the Garden of the Cesi Palace in 1581. Towards the end of the 16th century the contents of the Cesi garden began to be dispersed, and no further artistic record of the vase was made until the 18th century, when both the vase and the Silenus were purchased by Alessandro Albani. Luca Leoncini suggests the possibility that the vase had been in the Palazzo del Drago 'alle Quattro Fontane, which Albani purchased from the heirs of Cardinal Camillo Massimi, with all its contents.

In 1760 Albani moved it to his newly built Villa Albani, where the vase at first was a feature in the hall of the caffè, then in the villa's Porticus Romae. There, in Cardinal Albani's much-visited collection, it provided a model for the Piranesi Vase, a pastiche composed of various antique fragments and modern elements created by Giovanni Battista Piranesi.

When the Albani collection was eventually inherited by the Castelbarco family, the vase was resited in the villa's casina. In 1869 Prince Alessandro Torlonia, having inherited the collection, moved the vase to his private museum, leaving the Silenus at the Villa Albani.

A comparable neo-Attic marble vase was unearthed in fragmented condition near the Ospedale Santo Spirito, on the Lungotevere in Sassia, Rome, in 1929. It is conserved in the Museo Nazionale Romano.

== See also ==
- Borghese Vase
- Medici Vase
