= Warwick Vase =

Roman vase discovered in Tivoli in 1771

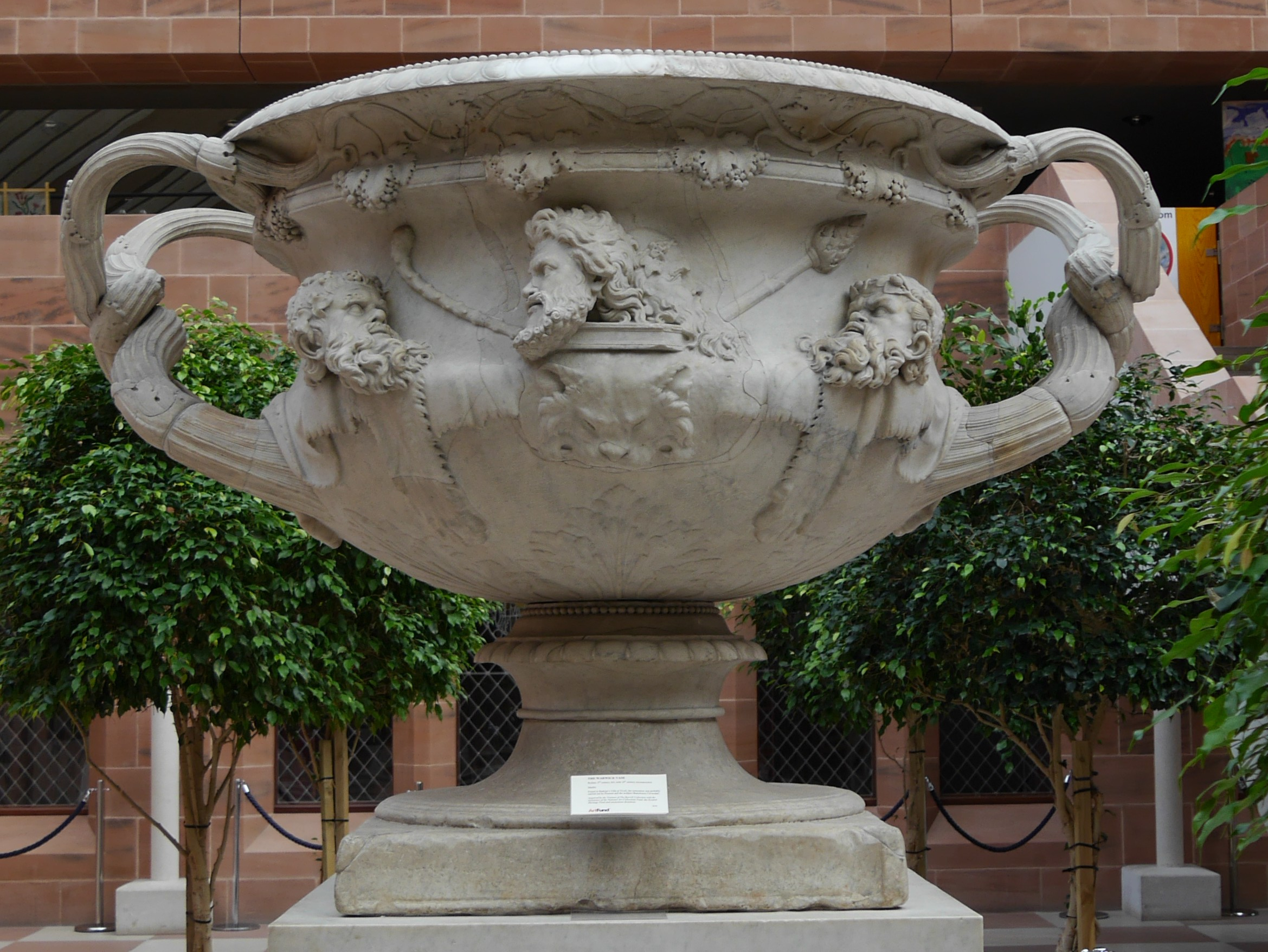
On display at the Burrell Collection near Glasgow

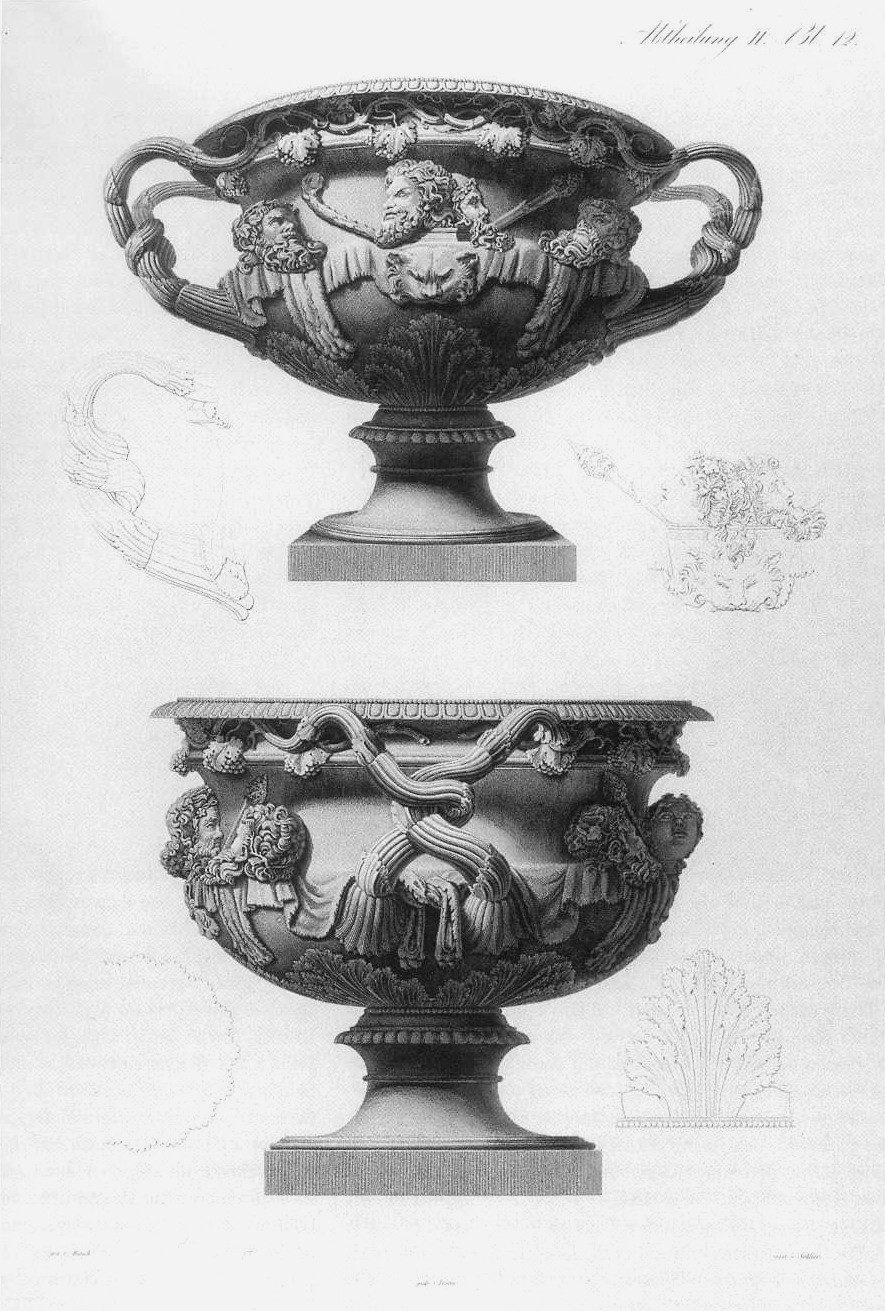
Engraving of the Warwick Vase, 1821, intended as a craftsman's pattern

The Warwick Vase is an ancient Roman marble (partially restored) vase with Bacchic ornament that was discovered at Hadrian's Villa, Tivoli about 1771 by Gavin Hamilton, a Scottish painter-antiquarian and art dealer in Rome, and is now in the Burrell Collection in Glasgow in Scotland.

The vase was found in the silt of a marshy pond at the low point of the villa's extensive grounds, where Hamilton had obtained excavation rights and proceeded to drain the area. Hamilton sold the fragments to Sir William Hamilton, British envoy at the court of Naples, from whose well-known collection it passed to his nephew George Greville, 2nd Earl of Warwick, where it caused a sensation.

== Restoration ==
The design and much of the ornament is Roman, of the second century CE, but the extent to which the fragments were restored and completed after its discovery, to render it a fit object for a connoisseur's purchase, may be judged from Sir William Hamilton's own remark:

I was obliged to cut a block of marble at Carrara to repair it, which has been hollowed out & the fragments fixed on it, by which means the vase is as firm & entire as the day it was made.

Sir William did not visit Carrara to hew the block himself. The connoisseur-dealer James Byres's role in shaping the present allure of the Warwick Vase is not generally noted:

The great Vase is nearly finished and I think comes well. I beg'd of Mr. Hamilton to go with me the other day to give his opinion. He approved much of the restoration but thought the female mask copied from that in Piranesi's candelabro ought to be a little retouch'd to give more squareness and character, he's of opinion that the foot ought neither to be fluted nor ornamented but left as it is being antique, and that no ornament ought to be introduced on the body of the vase behind the handles, saying that it would take away from the effect & grouping of the masks. Piranesi is of the same opinion relative to the foot, but thinks there is too great an emptyness behind the handles.... It's difficult to say which of these opinions ought to be followed, but I rather lean toward Mr. Hamiltons.

Thus, it appears James Byres, along with Giovanni Battista Piranesi, was put in charge of the vase's restoration and completion. Piranesi made two etchings of the vase as completed, dedicated to Sir William, which were included in his 1778 publication, Vasi, candelabri, cippi..." which secured its reputation and should have added to its market desirability. Sir William apparently hoped to sell it to the British Museum, which had purchased his collection of "Etruscan" vases: "Keep it I cannot, as I shall never have a house big enough for it", he wrote.

== The vase at Warwick Castle ==
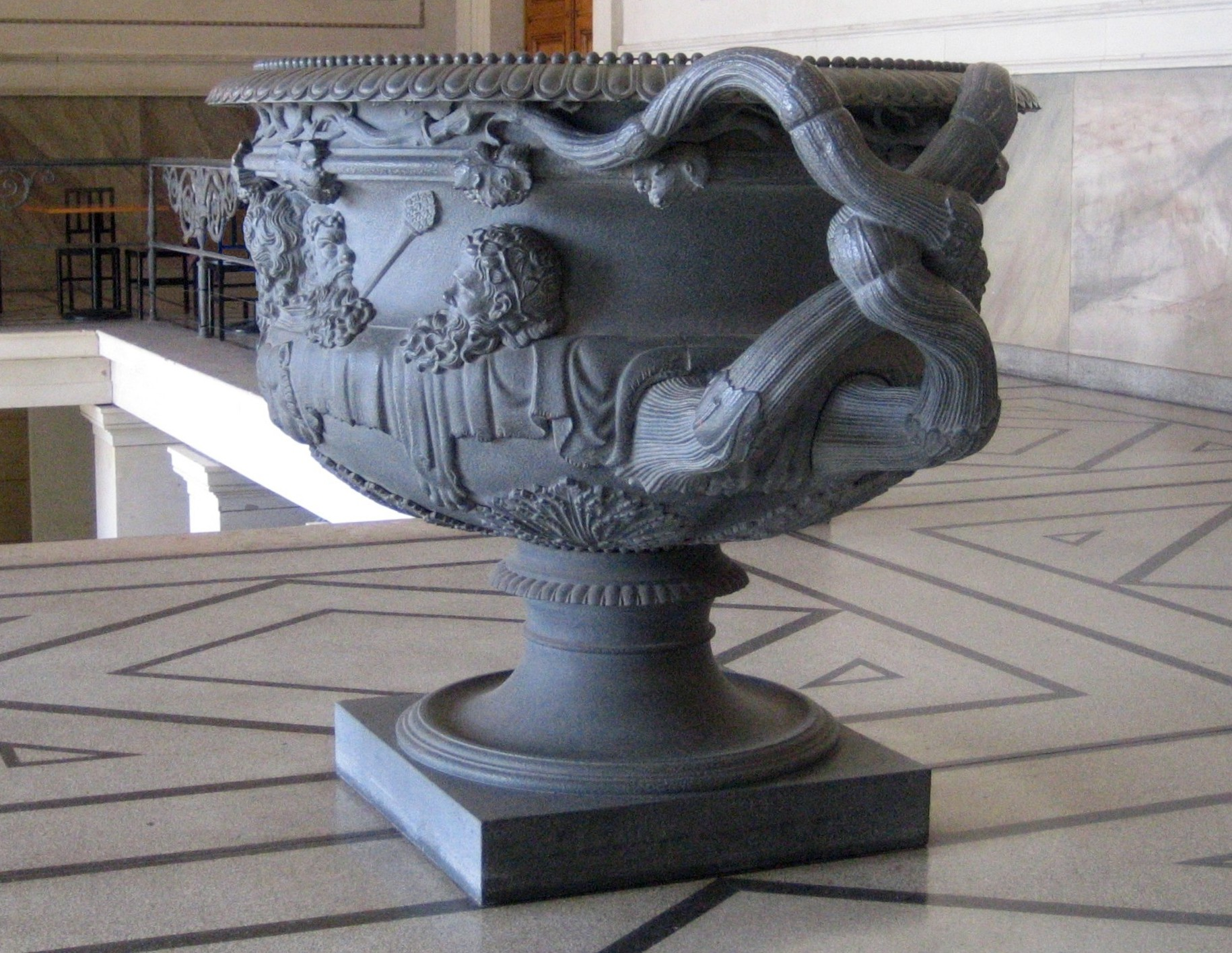
A refined 19th-century cast-iron copy of the Warwick Vase (Altes Museum, Berlin)

Disappointed by the British Museum, Hamilton shipped the fully restored vase to his elder nephew, George Greville, 2nd Earl of Warwick, who set it at first on a lawn at Warwick Castle, but with the intention of preserving it from the British climate, he commissioned a special greenhouse for it, fitted, however, with Gothic windows, from a local architect at Warwick, William Eboral:

I built a noble greenhouse, and filled it with beautiful plants. I placed in it a vase, considered as the finest remains of Grecian art extant for size and beauty.

The vase was displayed on a large plinth, which remains with it in the Burrell Collection, where it is also displayed in a courtyard-like setting inside the building, surrounded by miniature fig trees. The vase was widely admired and much visited in the Earl's greenhouse, but he permitted no full-size copies to be made of it, until moulds were made at the special request of Lord Lonsdale, who intended to have a full-size replica cast— in silver. The sculptor William Theed the elder, who was working for the Royal silversmiths Rundell, Bridge & Rundell, was put in charge of the arrangements, but Lord Lonsdale changed his mind, and a project truly of Imperial Russian scale was aborted.

The rich ornament, and the form, which is echoed in sixteenth-century Mannerist vases, combined to give the Warwick Vase great appeal to the nineteenth-century eye: numerous examples in silver and bronze were made, and porcelain versions by Rockingham and Worcester. Theed's moulds were sent to Paris, where two full-size bronze replicas were cast, one now at Windsor Castle, the other in the Fitzwilliam Museum, Cambridge. Reduced versions in cast-iron continue to be manufactured as garden ornaments, and in these ways the Warwick Vase took up a place in the visual repertory of classical design. It was the model for the silver-gilt tennis trophy, the Norman Brookes Challenge Cup won at the Australian Open.

== Sale ==
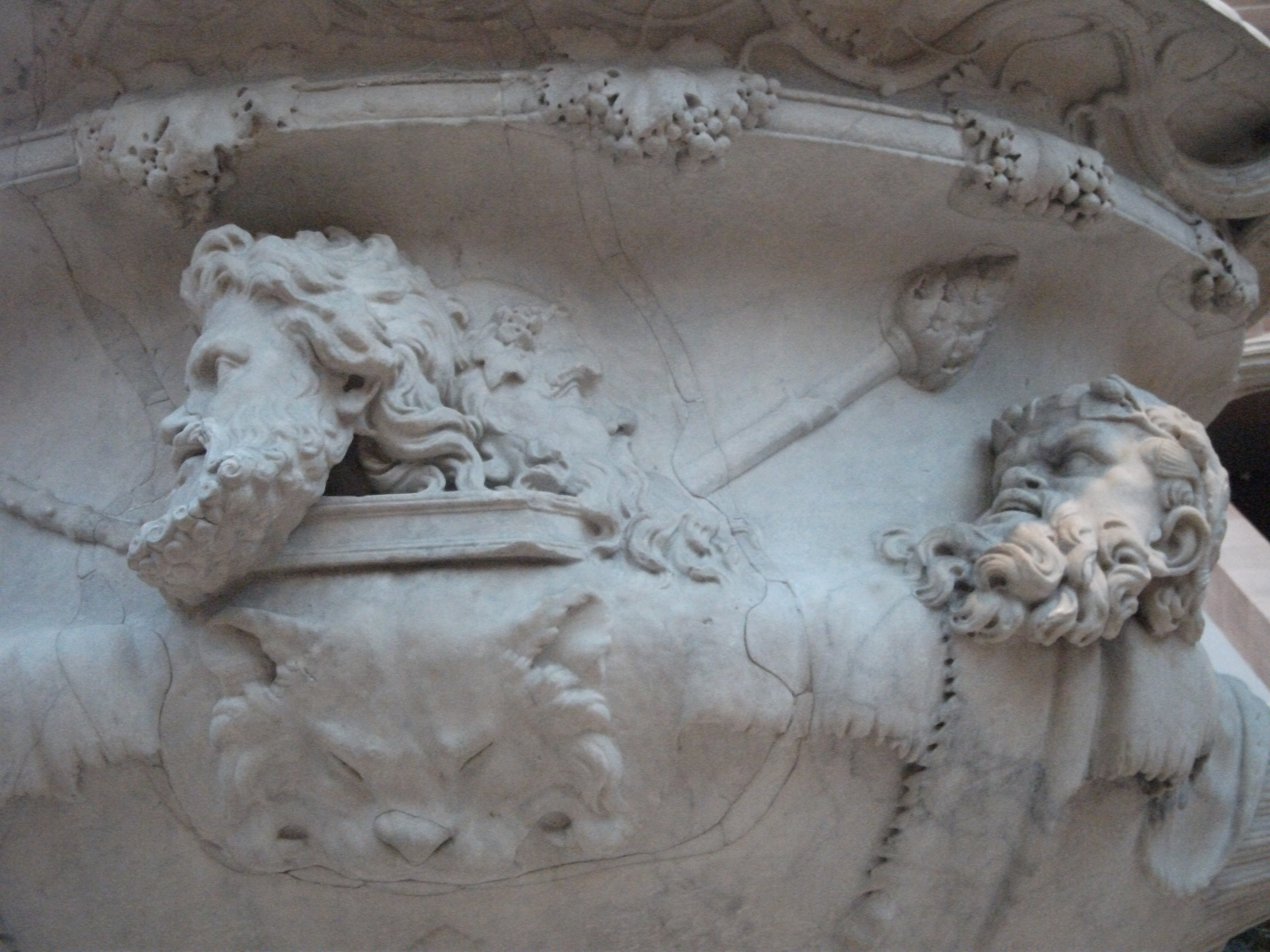
Detail

In 1978, the vase was sold in London by David Greville, Earl Brooke, son and heir of the 7th Earl of Warwick. Bought by the Metropolitan Museum of Art in New York, the Warwick Vase was declared an object of national importance, and an export license was delayed. Matching funds were raised, and, as it was not of sufficient archaeological value for the British Museum, it found a home at the Burrell Collection, in Glasgow.

The fullest discussion of the Warwick Vase is in three articles by N. M. Penzer, in Apollo 62 (1955:183ff) and 63 (1956:18ff, 71ff).

== See also ==
The following are major Roman marble vases:

- The Borghese Vase in the Louvre, Paris
- The Medici Vase in the Uffizi, Florence
- The Piranesi Vase in the British Museum, London
- The Townley Vase in the British Museum, London
