= Piranesi Vase =

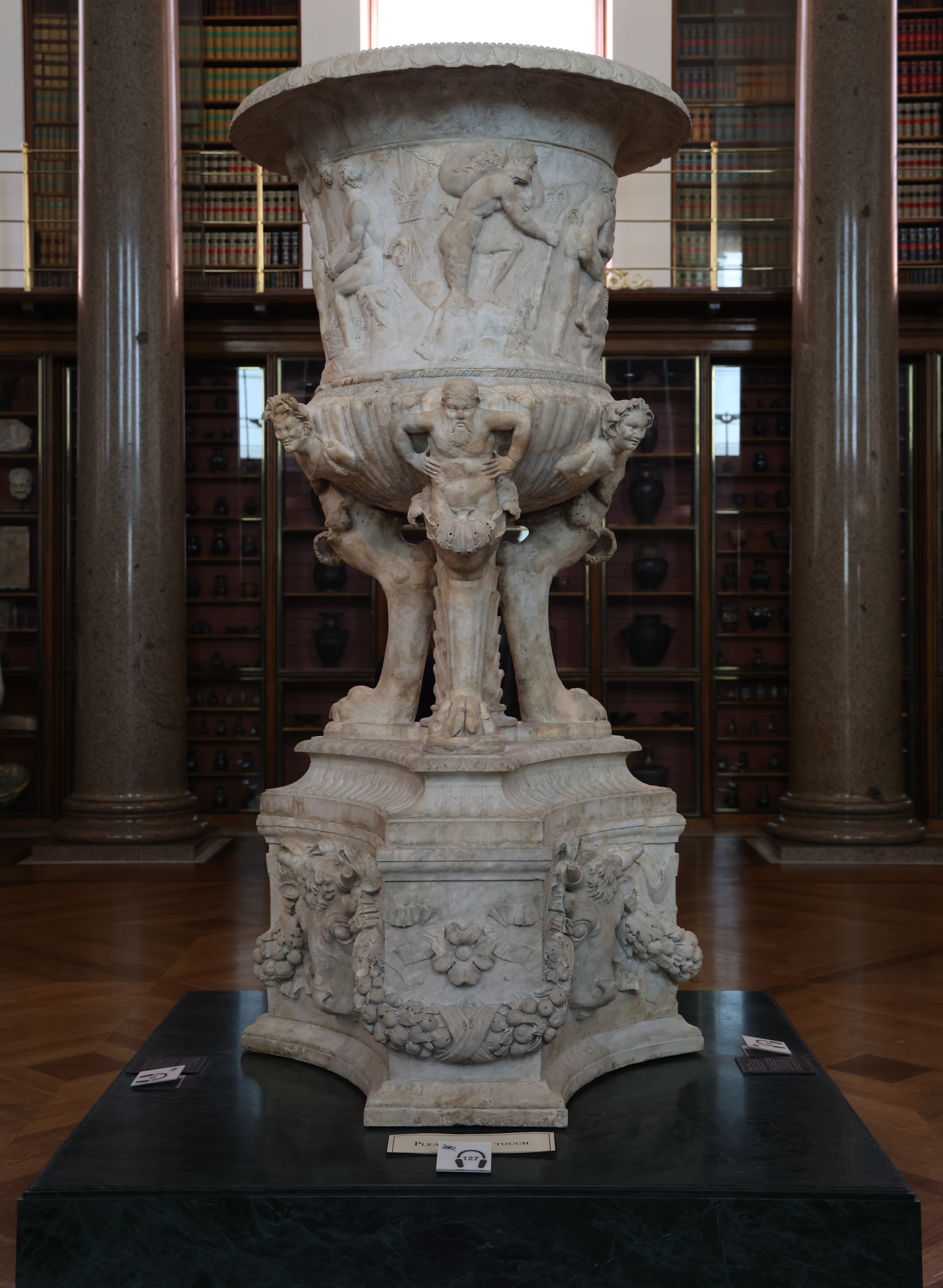
The Piranesi Vase in the British Museum

The Piranesi Vase or Boyd Vase is a reconstructed, colossal marble calyx krater from ancient Rome, on three legs and a triangular base, with a relief around the sides of the vase. It is 107 inches (2.71m) tall and 28 inches (0.71m) in diameter.

The upper part is in the style of the Borghese Vase. The lower part, which was not original, was influenced by the Torlonia Vase, a celebrated neo-Attic Roman marble from the collection of Cardinal Albani. It similarly stands on three lions' legs – which in the case of the Torlonia Vase were 16th-century additions.

The vase was restored and/or rebuilt by the artist Giovanni Battista Piranesi, from a large number of Roman fragments from Hadrian's Villa at Tivoli, where Gavin Hamilton was excavating in the 1770s. As mentioned above, parts of the Piranesi vase are a pastiche – its stem and supports are made up of a variety of unrelated ancient fragments supplemented by matching modern parts. Other parts are painstaking, skillful and accurate reconstructions. Its frieze uses numerous original fragments to reproduce a scene of satyrs making wine. The scene was modeled on a Roman altar in Naples that in the 18th century was in the collection of the Prince of Francavilla and illustrated in Bernard de Montfaucon's 1757 Recueil d'Antiquités.

The Piranesi Vase and the so-called Warwick Vase are among the most ambitious restoration projects in which Piranesi was involved. Each vase was depicted by three plates in Vasi, Candelabri e Cippi, a compilation of etchings produced in 1778. The vase was sold as a genuine ancient Roman artefact, which was considered an acceptable practice at the time.

The diary of a Dutch tourist mentions the vase in the Piranesi workshop in 1776. Sometime that year it was acquired by Sir John Boyd during his Grand Tour. He was a wealthy West Indies proprietor and director of the British East India Company, and displayed it in the landscaped grounds of his neo-Palladian mansion Danson House at Bexley, where the dining room's wallpaintings took up the vase's Bacchic themes.

It was purchased from Boyd's eventual heirs and Hugh Johnston by the British Museum in 1868. It was exhibited in the Orangery of Kensington Palace from 1955 to 1976. It is now in the Enlightenment Gallery of the British Museum.

== Sources ==
- T. Opper, "Glory of Rome restored", British Museum Magazine 51 (Spring 2005), 38–40.
- E. Miller, "The Piranesi Vase", in: A. Oddy (ed.) The Art of the Conservator (London 1992), 122–136.
- J. Scott, "Some sculpture from Hadrian's Villa, Tivoli", in: Piranesi e la cultura antiquaria: gli antecedenti e il contesto (Rome 1983), 339–355.
