= Imperiali =

Imperiali may refer to:

- Imperiali quota, an unusually-low electoral quota
- Imperiali family, including a list of people with the surname
