= Cavalcade Painter =

Ancient Greek vase painter

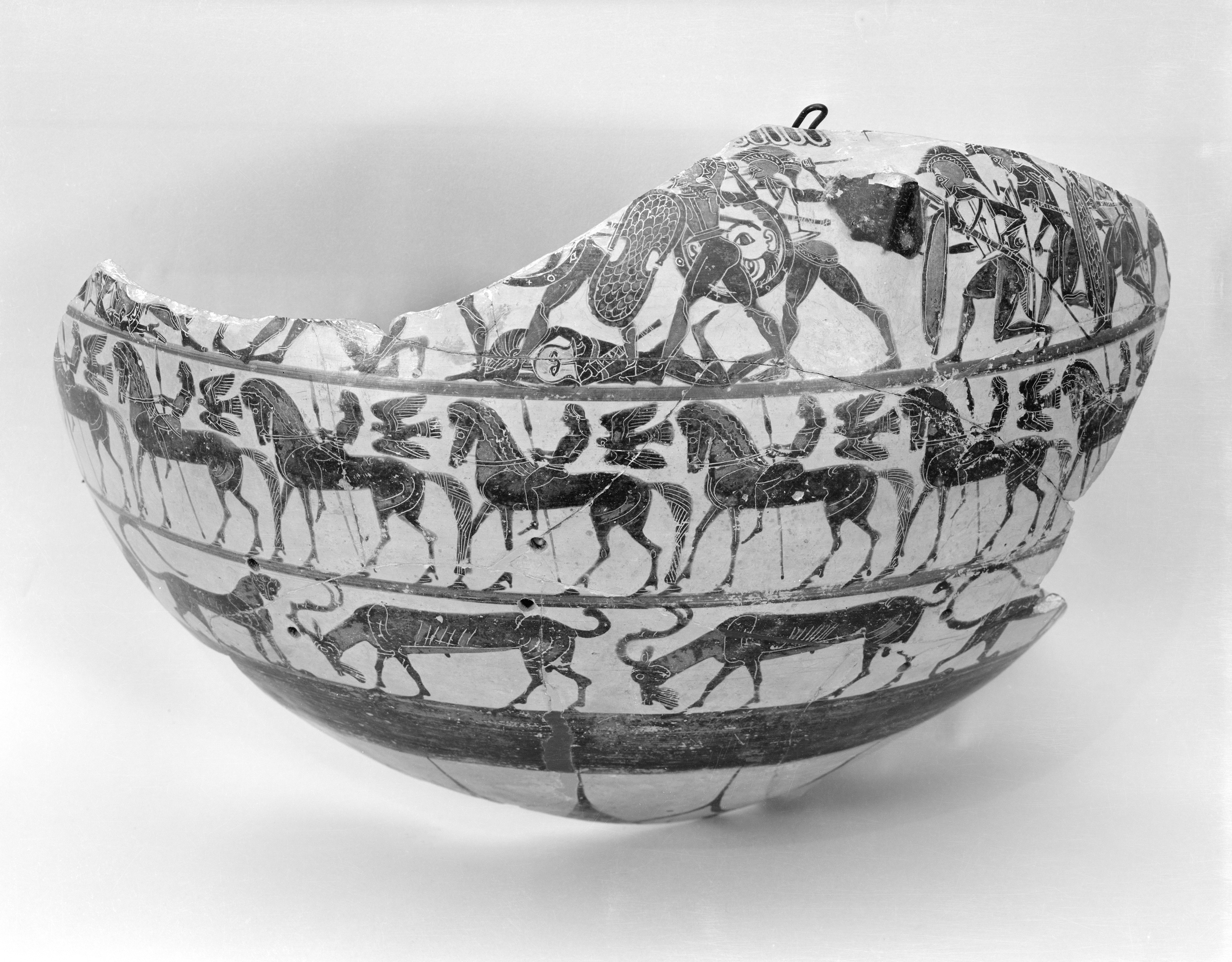
Fragment of a middle Corinthian terracotta column-krater (ca. 590–570 B.C.), depicting a band of fighting warriors, a cavalcade of riders, and a band of goats and panthers; Metropolitan Museum of Art (12.229.9)

The Cavalcade Painter is the conventional name for an ancient Greek vase painter who produced Corinthian black-figure vases. He was active during the Middle Corinthian period, around 580 BC.

The Cavalcade Painter is considered one of the most important and best Corinthian painters of his time. He was the leading artist of the Gorgoneion Group. He mainly decorated kylikes and kraters. His favourite subject, found on nearly all his cup exteriors, were his eponymous scenes of horsemen; he also painted fighting scenes and animal friezes. As usual within his group, the interiors of the cups were decorated with a gorgon’s head. On one piece, he painted the suicide of Ajax, accompanied by several name inscriptions. His kraters also depict friezes of horsemen, fighting scenes, cavalcades and animal friezes. His most important work on that shape depicts a nuptial couple in a chariot. That work marks already the transition to Late Corinthian vase painting. Nine works by him are known; findspots include Aegina and Kameiros.

== Bibliography ==
- Thomas Mannack: Griechische Vasenmalerei. Eine Einführung. Theiss, Stuttgart 2002, p. 101 ISBN 3-8062-1743-2.
- Matthias Steinhart: Kavalkade-Maler. In: Der Neue Pauly (DNP). Vol 6, Metzler, Stuttgart 1999, ISBN 3-476-01476-2, Col. 370–371.
