= Gorgoneion Group =

The Gorgoneion Group was a group of Corinthian vase painters working in the black-figure technique. They were active in Middle Corinthian Period (circa 600 to 575 BC), around 580 BC. The Gorgoneion Group mainly decorated kylikes and kraters. The striking decoration of the insides of cups with Gorgon heads is the base of its modern name. Its leading artist was the Cavalcade Painter.
