= Imperiali family =

Genoese noble family

Imperiali
- Genoese noble family
- Country: Republic of Genoa; Kingdom of Naples; Kingdom of Spain; Kingdom of France; Kingdom of Italy
- Current region: Luxemburg; Belgium; Italy; European Union
- Origin: Republic of Genoa
- Founded: 11th century
- Founder: Giovanni il Tartaro
- Motto: Sub umbra alarum tuarum

The House of Imperiali (or Imperiale) is an ancient princely noble family. It is one of the most important Italian noble families and was a key protagonist of European history among aristocratic families. Originating from the Republic of Genoa it was previously named Tartaro (10th century), and descends from the House of Ventimiglia. Also following the behavior of Captain Davide Imperiale during the Battle of Lepanto (7 October 1571), the family acquired much prestige in the Republic of Genoa and had among its members 4 doges. It was one of the most powerful families dominating the city's politics in the 17th and 18th century and owned a vast amount of land in Italy.

== Titles ==
The various titles of the Imperiali family acquired over years are the following:

- Honorific treatment of Don or Donna (name)
- Grandees of Spain
- Princes of Francavilla (1639)
- Princes of Sant'Angelo dei Lombardi (1718)
- Princes of Montafia (1725)
- Princes of Castagneto (1789)
- Marquises of Latiano (1668)
- Marquises of Oyra (1572)
- Marquises of Livorno (1725)
- Marquises of Pianezza (1725)
- Marquises of Roatta (1725)
- Marquises of Casetelnuovo (1725)
- Marquises of Moretta (1725)
- Marquises of Dego (1725)
- Marquises of Cagna (1725)
- Marquises of Giusvalla (1725)
- Marquises of Piana nel Monferrato (1725)

The family is recognized and received into the Sovereign Military Order of Malta and the Sacred Military Constantinian Order of Saint George.

== Cardinals of the Catholic Church ==
The Imperiali family possessed a strong presence in religion and had three cardinals:

Lorenzo Imperiali (1612–1673).

Giuseppe Renato Imperiali (1651–1737) participated in the papal enclave after the death of Pope Innocent X and was only one vote short of being elected pope.

Cosimo Imperiali (1685–1764): Born in Genoa, he was great-grandnephew of Cardinal Lorenzo Imperiali, nephew of Cardinal Giuseppe Renato Imperiali, and cousin of Cardinal Giuseppe Spinelli. He was made cardinal in 1753. He participated in the Conclave of 1758, that elected Pope Clement XIII.

== Historical Buildings ==
=== Palazzo Imperiali in Genova ===
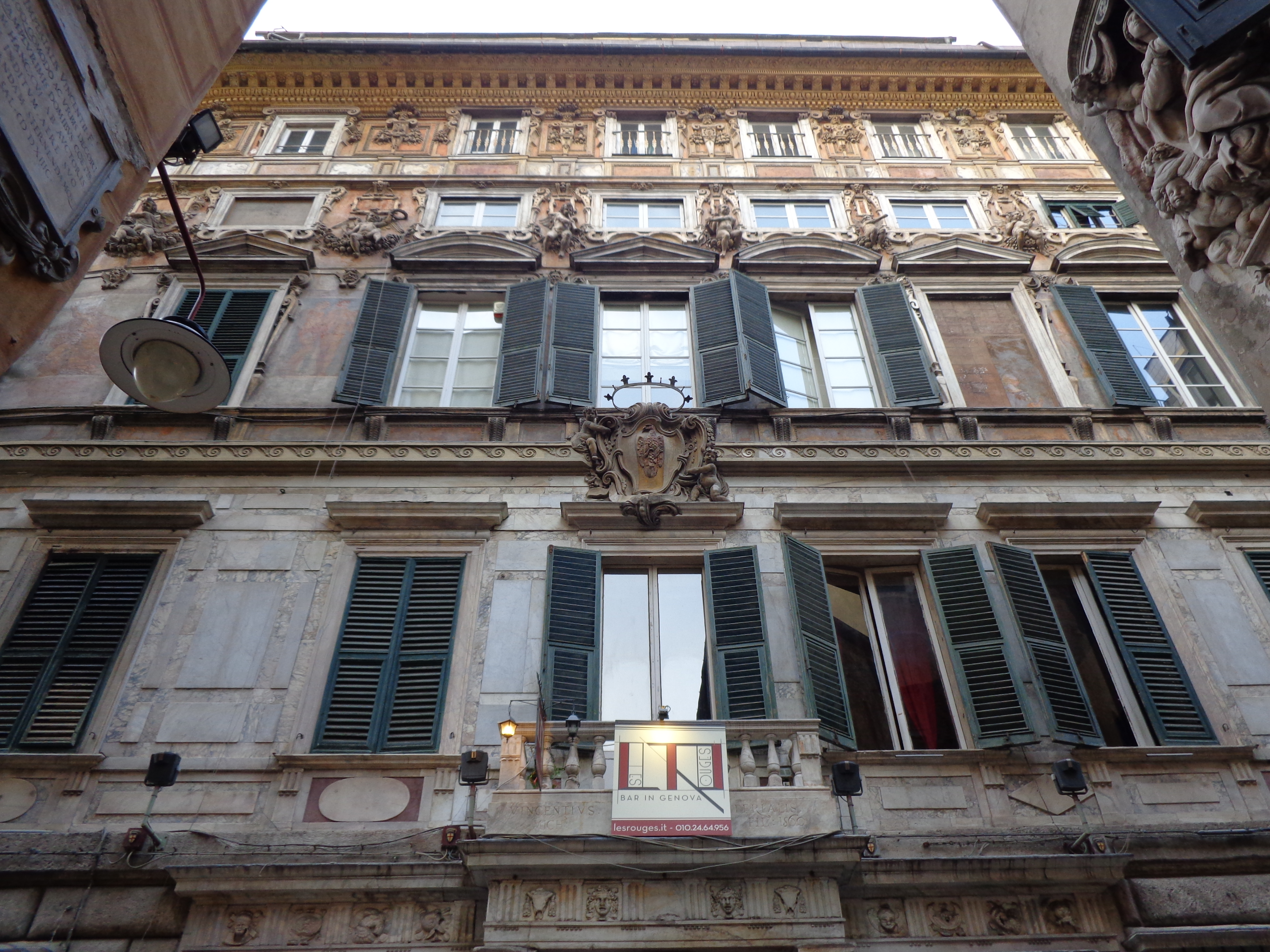

The palace was built in around 1560 for Giovan Vincenzo Imperiale.

=== Villa Imperiali in Genova ===
The villa was purchased by the Imperiali family from the Catteneo. Its gardens are currently open to the public and the building is host to the communal library known as "Lercari".

=== Castle of Francavilla Fontana ===
Originally built in 1455 by Giovanni Antonio del Balzo Orsini. It was purchased by the Imperiali family from S. Carlo Borromeo, from the House of Borromeo, in the 16th century for 40,000 ounces of gold.

=== Castle Imperiali di Villa Castelli ===
The castle was purchased by the Imperiali in the 17th century from the Orsini family.

=== Castello di Sant'Angelo dei Lombardi ===
The building dates back to the 10th century. Major works were carried out by the Caracciolo family in the 17th century and by Prince Placido Imperiale after purchasing the building. The 1980 Irpinia earthquake severely damaged the building's structure.

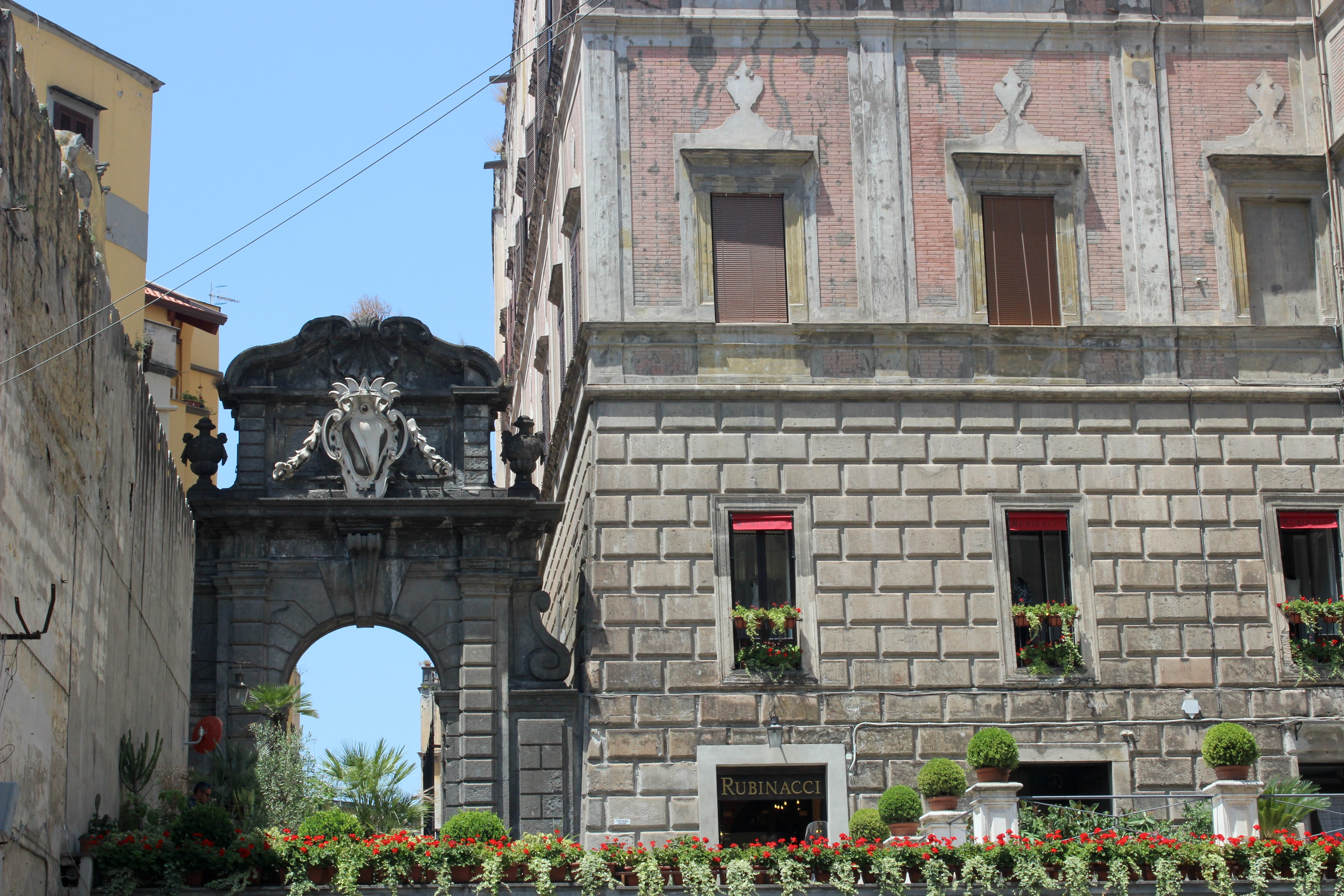

=== Palazzo Imperiali a Salza Irpina ===
The estate was a rural residence and hunting lodge. Due to the 1980 earthquake, the building underwent a major restoration project, subsequently becoming the property of the Municipality of Salza Irpina.

== Famous members ==
- Michele Imperiali Simeana, Prince of Montena and Francavilla (c. 1736 – 1782).
- Davide Imperiale (1540–1612).
- Giovanni Vincenzo Imperiale (1582–1648), politician, art collector, and poet.
- Giulio I Imperiale (1680–1738), first prince of Sant'Angelo dei Lombardi.
- Caterina Imperiale Lercari Pallavicini (fl. 1721), neo-Latin poet and member of the Pontifical Academy of Arcadia.
- Marquis Guglielmo Imperiali (1858–1944), diplomat, his most important position was as the Italian ambassador in London during the First World War (1914–18).
- Marquis Pierre Imperiali (1874–1940) (second cousin of Guglielmo), Belgian politician and senator, inventor of the Imperiali quota and of the Imperiali method.
- Giovanni Imperiali d'Afflitto di Francavilla (1890–1983) Italian army general in the first and second world war. Descendant from the princely House d’Afflitto.
- Katie Boyle (1926–2018), daughter of the Marchese Demetrio Imperiali di Francavilla and his English wife, a British television personality, game-show panelist and animal rights activist, known from the 1960s on.

== See also ==
- History of Francavilla Fontana

== Bibliography ==
- Gian Domenico Oltrona Visconti, Imperialis Familia, Piacenza 1999.
