= Michele Imperiali Simeana, Prince of Montena and Francavilla =

Spanish grandee and collector of classical sculpture

Michele Imperiali Simeana, Prince of Montafia and Francavilla (before 1736 – 1782) was a Spanish grandee and collector of classical sculpture, who also acted as major domo to the King of Naples and was a Knight of the Golden Fleece from 1770 onwards. He belonged to the Imperiali family.

== Biography ==
His collection included the Piranesi Vase. He became friends with Casanova in 1770, who visited his home, the Palazzo Cellammare in Naples. His picture collection was estimated at 30,000 ducats, containing works by Titian and Paul Veronese. The terraced gardens were considered to be among the finest in Naples.

== See also ==
- History of Francavilla Fontana
