= Caterina Imperiale Lercari Pallavicini =

18th-century Neo-Latin poet

Caterina Imperiale Pallavicini (also spelled "Catharina"; pen name, Arsinda Poliades; fl. 1721) was an 18th-century Neo-Latin poet from the greater Genoa region. Her work, which was published in the collections of the Pontifical Academy of Arcadia (Pontificia Accademia degli Arcadi), includes the styles of epigram and elegy.

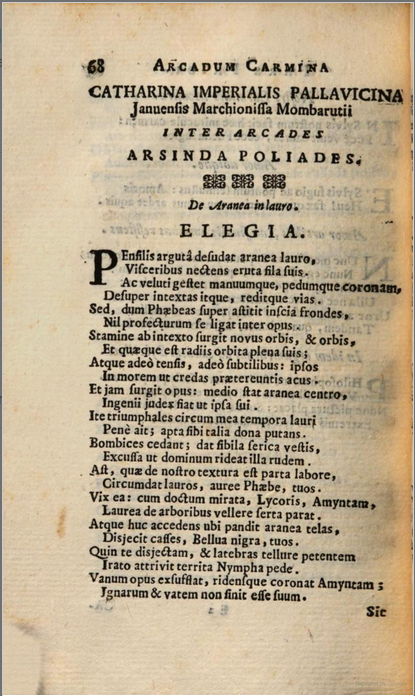
Catharina's poetry as published in the Arcadum Carmina, 1721

== Life ==
Caterina was born into and married into prominent aristocratic families—the Lercari family and the Imperiali family. During the time of her writing, she was the marchioness (Marquess) of Mombaruzzo. The Pallavicini family into which Caterina married profited greatly off of Genoan trade for hundreds of years (since the 15th century). Records suggest that Caterina's paternal grandfather, Ansaldo Imperiale Lercari, was close trading partners with the Pallavicini family. When Caterina married Paolo Gerolamo III Pallavicini, she brought the Cosma Centurione Palace (now a UNESCO World Heritage site) with her as a dowry. This palace was in the family of her paternal great-grandfather, Adamo Centurione, marquess of Monasterio, and further demonstrates the illustrious background that afforded Caterina the opportunity to learn and be published in Latin.

Her writings earned her membership into the Pontifical Academy of Arcadia which was an Italian literary society that had its beginnings in an academic circle created by Christina, Queen of Sweden. It was famous for its combat against Marinism. In 1656, during her exile in Rome, Queen Christina started gathering literary scholars and writers into her social circle. After the death of this unconventional queen, the group of writers who had gathered formalized their society by creating what was known in Italian as the Pontificia Accademia degli Arcadi. This academy wanted to move away from the Baroque poetry gaining popularity at the time and instead pursue classic, bucolic poetry in the tradition of the Greco-Roman world.

== Work ==
Like many members of the academy who adopted “pastoral” pen names, Caterina had the pastoral name Arsinda Poliades. She was considered a full member of the Arcadian society and had work published in (at least) the 1721 edition of the society's publication, Arcadum Carmina. This edition was also reprinted in 1757. Though many women belonged to the academy throughout its approximately 200-year history, of the thirty-three authors present in the 1721 book of poems, Caterina is the only female author to appear. Her work also differs from the work by male authors in the collection because she is one of only six authors to write epigrams. The longer elegy and eclogue (pastoral) formats are much more popular among her male counterparts. Here is an epigram written by her:

Quid nam sit tempus? Se scire, aut dicere posse,

unâ omnes, sapiens, insipiensque negant.

Nempe animus noster vitam scit, tempora nescit:

Aeternum quid enim praetereuntis habet?

Sed cur tristatur de praetereuntibus annis?

Heu timet iratum sistier ante Deum!

Sistar ego: sed qualis ero? sons dicar, an insons?

Utraque, care Deus, si mihi parcis, ero.
