= Giuseppe Renato Imperiali =

Italian cardinal

His Eminence Giuseppe Renato Imperiali
- Cardinal-Priest of San Lorenzo in Lucina
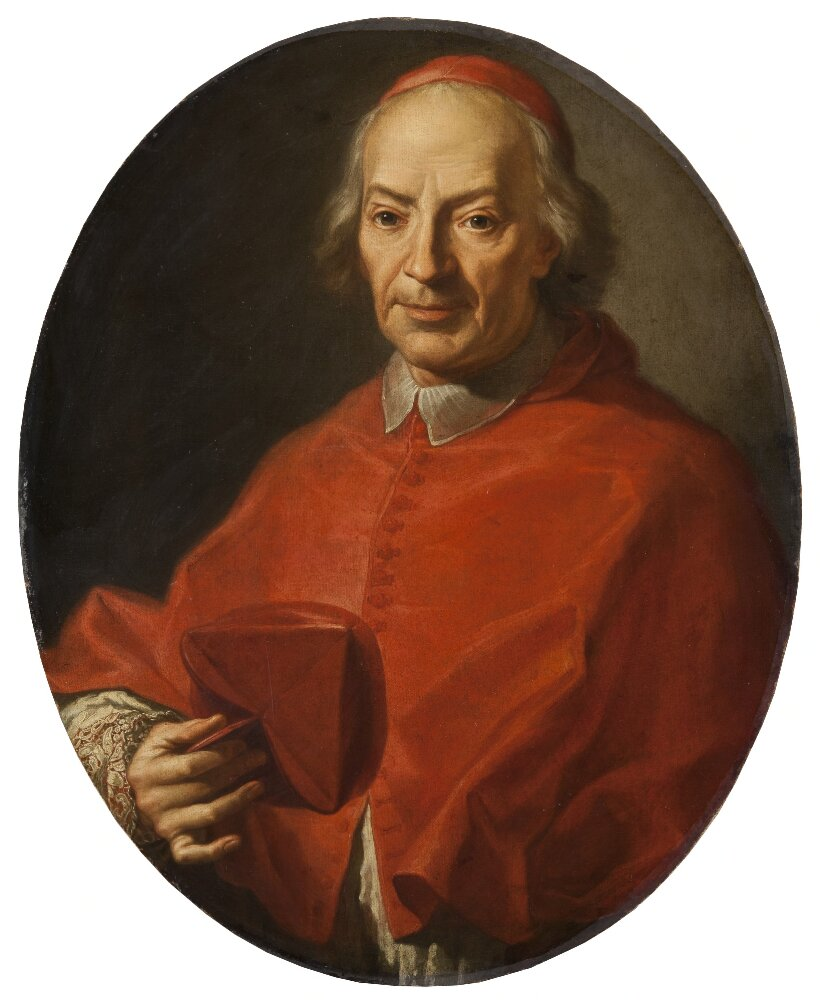
- Portrait by Antonio David, 18th century
- Church: Catholic Church
- Appointed: 20 January 1727
- Term ended: 18 February 1737
- Predecessor: Giuseppe Sacripante
- Successor: Gianantonio Davia
- Previous posts: Cardinal-Deacon of San Giorgio in Velabro (1690-1726)

Orders
- Created cardinal: 13 February 1690 by Pope Alexander VIII
- Rank: Cardinal-Priest

Personal details
- Born: 1 May 1651 Francavilla Fontana, Naples
- Died: 18 February 1737 (aged 85) Rome, Papal States
- Buried: Sant'Agostino
- Coat of arms

Giuseppe Renato Imperiali (1 May 1651 – 18 February 1737) was an Italian cardinal, and known as an avid bibliophile.

== Biography ==
He was born in Francavilla Fontana in Apulia, in the Kingdom of Naples, into an aristocratic family which had come from Genoa. In 1662, he was sent to Rome with three brothers to live with his great uncle, Cardinal Lorenzo Imperiali (1612 - 1673). Lorenzo was a son of the Genoese nobleman Michele Imperiali.

In Rome, Giuseppe studied at the Collegio Germanico-Ungarico, and in 1672 he was made referendary of the Segnatura.

In 1688, he entered a religious order. In 1684 he gained the lucrative post of Chierico della Camera Apostolica in the papal finance office; in 1688, he rose to become Treasurer General of the Holy Roman Church. In the Consistory of 13 February 1690 he was made a Cardinal by Pope Alexander VIII, and was assigned the Deaconry of San Giorgio in Velabro on 10 April 1690. He was soon sent to Ferrara as papal legate and remained there for seven years.

Back in Rome, during the Conclave of 1700 Imperiali was part of a group of cardinals who were trying to resist the pressure applied by foreign governments aiming to influence Papal elections, and they obtained the election of cardinal Giovanni Francesco Albani as Pope Clement XI. Clement in turn, rewarded Imperiali in 1701 by appointing him to the powerful position of Prefect of the Congregation of Buon Governo. In this position, he controlled funding for public works projects in the Papal States. Among these he commissioned the aqueduct of Benevento and the new façade of the Cathedral of Poggio Mirteto from Carlo Buratti. Among his other endeavours was his attempt in 1720 to influence the Republic of Genoa to arrest Cardinal Giulio Alberoni.

Upon the death of Benedict XIII in 1730, Cardinal Imperiali was touted as a candidate for the Papacy. In the Conclave of 1730, however, the opposition of the cardinals of the French and Spanish interest ensured that Imperiali failed to obtain the two-thirds required to be elected as pope, and instead Lorenzo Corsini was chosen and took the name Pope Clement XII. Imperiali continued to serve the Vatican in prominent roles until he died in Rome in 1737, at the age of 85. He was buried in the church of Sant'Agostino. His nephew, Cosimo Imperiali (1685–1764), also became a cardinal.

== Formation of the Imperiali Library ==
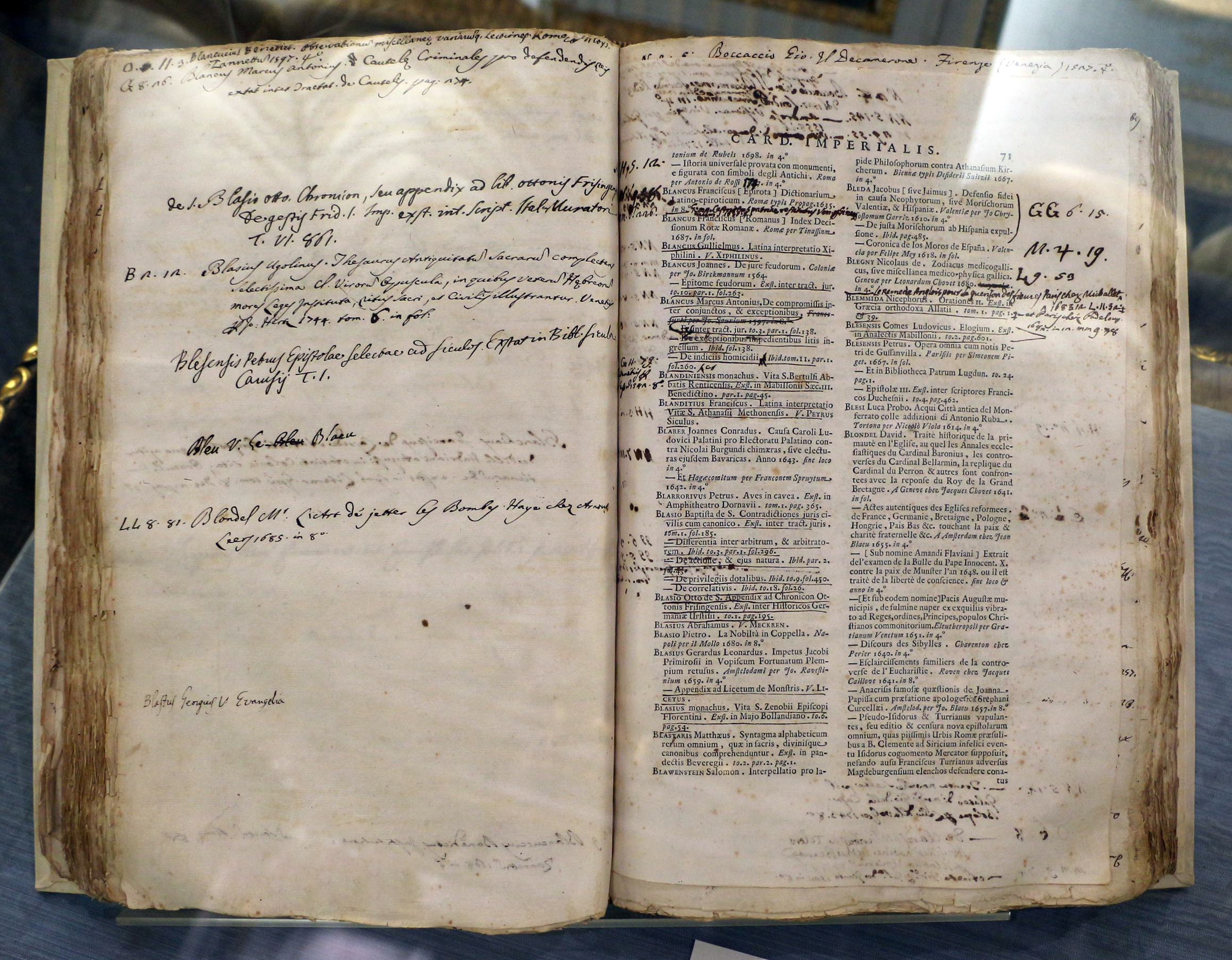
Giusto Fontanini, Bibliotecae Josephi Renati Imperialis..., Rome, 1711

Renato's grand-uncle, Cardinal Lorenzo Imperiali, had amassed the nucleus of a collection of books in his Palazzo della Casa di Loreto in Campo Marzio. He also left money for its expansion and maintenance. In 1711, the catalogue of the library listed nearly 15,000 manuscripts, including large collections of books on law, philosophy, and literature. The palace also contained artworks by the painters Carlo Maratta, Domenico Maria Muratori, and Francesco Ferrandi.

Under Renato, the library was moved to the Palazzo Nicolini del Bufalo. He enriched the library by buying collections from Jean Gautier de Sluse and monsignor Marcello Severoli in 1689-1690.

However, the library, though dispersed, is remembered because of the catalogue prepared in 1711 by its librarian, Giusto Fontanini (1666-1736). This voluminous achievement was begun in 1697, and continued by his successor, Domenico Giorgi. Unfortunately, the heirs of Imperiali were not able to keep the entire library together; portions have made their way into the National Library in Rome. By 1829, portions of the collection were selling in England, having been acquired in Rome by the Earl of Guilford.

== General sources ==
- F. Cancedda, Figure e fatti intorno alla biblioteca del cardinale Imperiali, mecenate del '700, Roma, Bulzoni, 1995.
- Bibliotheca Imperiali: Giusto Fontanini. Bibliothecae Josephi Renati Imperialis Catalogus, in A. Serrai, Storia della Bibliografia, Roma, Bulzoni, V (1993), pp. 659–665.
- "I cataloghi delle biblioteche cardinalizie", in A. Serrai, Storia della Bibliografia, Roma, Bulzoni, VII (1997), pp. 603–819.

Records
Preceded by Innico Caracciolo	Oldest living Member of the Sacred College; 6 September 1730 – 18 February 1737	Succeeded by André-Hercule de Fleury
