= Lorenzo Imperiali =

Italian cardinal (1612–1673)

His Eminence Lorenzo Imperiali
- Cardinal-Priest of San Crisogono
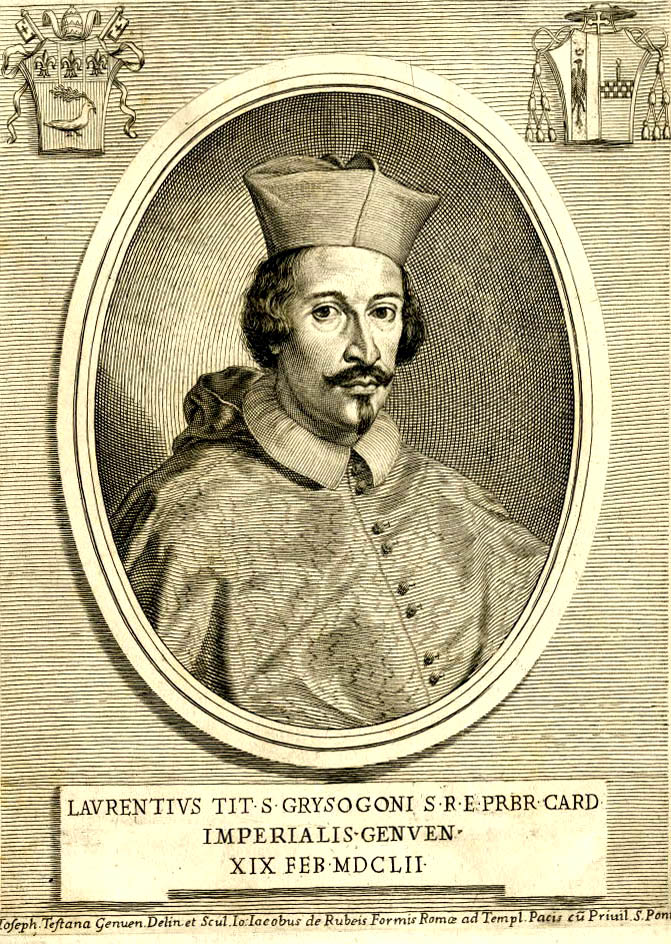
- Church: Catholic Church

Personal details
- Born: 21 February 1612 Genoa, Italy
- Died: 21 September 1673 (aged 61) Rome, Italy

Lorenzo Imperiali (21 February 1612 - 21 September 1673) was an Italian Catholic cardinal.

== Early life ==
Coat of arms of the Imperiali family

Imperiali was born in Genoa on 21 February 1612 to the patrician Imperiali family of that city.

He went to Rome during the pontificate of Pope Urban VIII and was appointed vice-legate in Bologna and governor of Fano and Ascoli Piceno. During the absence of Cardinal Antonio Barberini he was appointed legate in Ferrara. He was later appointed cleric of the Apostolic Chamber.

During the Wars of Castro, Imperiali was appointed governor of those provinces of the State of Castro under the control of the papacy and was appointed commissary-general of the papal army. He was later sent by Pope Innocent X to Fermo to put down the uprising that had cost the life of its governor in 1648.

Pope Innocent appointed Imperiali governor of Rome between 1653 and 1654.

== Ecclesiastical career ==
Before appointing Imperiali governor, the pope elevated him to cardinal but the elevation was reserved in pectore until Imperiali stepped down as governor in 1654; his cardinalate was published in the consistory of 2 March 1654 and he was appointed cardinal-priest of the Church of San Crisogono.

He participated in the papal conclave of 1655 which elected Pope Alexander VII.

In 1660, he was again named governor of Rome by Pope Alexander, but in 1662, he fell victim to the Corsican Guard Affair. Contemporary John Bargrave recounts that while he was governor, François, Duke of Créquy and ambassador of France, visited Rome with his wife. A grave misunderstanding led to the ambassador's wife's coach being attacked and fired upon by papal troops from the Corsican Guard.

As punishment, Imperiali was transferred as legate to the newly created legation in the province of the Marche. Later, he resigned his legation and went to Paris to explain his conduct to King Louis XIV of France.

Imperiali participated in the papal conclave of 1667 which elected Pope Clement IX and the conclave of 1669-1670 which elected Pope Innocent XI. During these conclaves, Imperiali was a senior member of the liberal movement Squadrone Volante. It is thought the group engineered the election of Giulio Rospigliosi as Pope Clement in 1667.

Imperiali died on 21 September 1673 in Rome and was buried in the chapel of Saint Thomas of Villanova in the Basilica di Sant'Agostino. A grandson of his brother, Giuseppe Renato Imperiali (born 1651), who had lived in his household since 1662, would be named cardinal in 1690.

Catholic Church titles
Preceded by Faustus Poli	Cardinal-Priest of San Crisogono; 1654–1673	Succeeded by Giambattista Spada
