= 1730 conclave =

Election of Catholic Pope Clement XII

Papal conclave March–July 1730

Dates and location
- 5 March – 12 July 1730; Apostolic Palace, Papal States

Key officials
- Dean: Francesco Pignatelli
- Sub-dean: Francesco Barberini
- Camerlengo: Annibale Albani
- Protopriest: Giuseppe Renato Imperiali
- Protodeacon: Benedetto Pamphili; Lorenzo Altieri

Election
- Vetoed: Giuseppe Renato Imperiali

Elected pope
- Lorenzo Corsini; Name taken: Clement XII
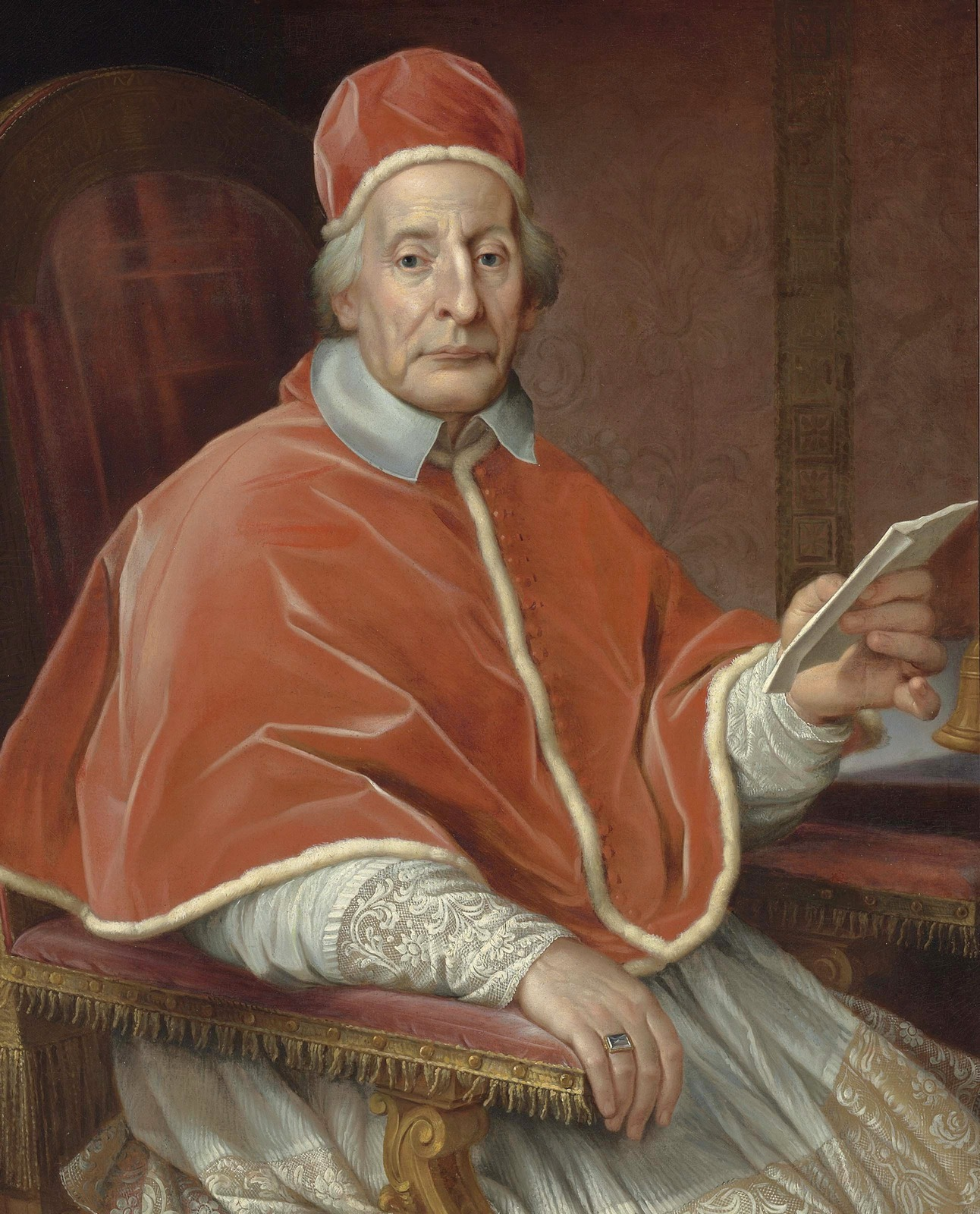

The 1730 papal conclave was called upon the death of Pope Benedict XIII. It began on 5 March 1730 and ended on 12 July that year with the election of Cardinal Lorenzo Corsini as Pope Clement XII.

== Background ==
Pope Benedict XIII died on February 21, 1730, at the age of eighty-one. The conclave which followed is considered to be the longest and most corrupt of the 18th century. The conclave opened on March 5 with thirty cardinals, but the numbers increased as more began to arrive. None of the Portuguese Cardinals were in attendance, apparently due to friction between Rome and Lisbon. There were fifty-six cardinals present. At some point in the four-month long ordeal, at least half of them had been proposed as candidates for election.

== Factions ==
One voting bloc was made up of twelve cardinals who had been appointed by Benedict XIII, but this group had no clear leader. A second group was made up of cardinals appointed by Pope Alexander VIII. Politically, they were allied with the French party, which represented the interests of Louis XV.

The Imperial party were all subjects of the Holy Roman Emperor. This group included Cardinal Gianantonio Davia, a former papal nuncio to Vienna under salary from the imperial court. The Spanish party suffered from internal dissension, but was broadly allied with the Emperor.

There were also a Savoyard contingent representing Victor Amadeus II of Savoy, King of Sardinia; and the zelanti, who opposed all secular interference. In addition, the Florentine House of Medici was using financial enticements to forward their candidate, Lorenzo Corsini.

None of the factions were sufficiently large enough to bring a successful vote for their respective candidates.

== Political influence ==
From about 1600 to the early 20th century, certain Catholic monarchs claimed the jus exclusivae (right of exclusion), i.e. to veto a candidate for the papacy, exercised through a crown-cardinal. By an informal convention, each state claiming the veto was allowed to exercise the right once per conclave. Therefore, a crown-cardinal did not announce the veto until the last moment when the candidate in question seemed likely to get elected. This conclave saw a good deal of maneuvering by the various parties to induce another to exercise the veto prematurely. At one point, in lieu of a veto, the Spanish party threatened to exit the conclave if a particular opposition candidate was likely to be chosen.

Cardinal Cornelio Bentivoglio presented the veto of King Philip V of Spain against the election of Cardinal Giuseppe Renato Imperiali. During the conclave of 1700 Imperiali was part of a group of cardinals who were trying to resist the pressure applied by foreign governments aiming to influence papal elections. In 1720 he had attempted to influence the Republic of Genoa to arrest Cardinal Giulio Alberoni, an erstwhile court favorite made a duke and grandee of Spain. However, the veto had been signed by the Spanish Secretary of State rather than the King and was subject to a challenge. Matters dragged on while a messenger was sent to Madrid to obtain verification.

The Emperor had sent notification of his opposition to Cardinal Pietro Marcellino Corradini, who appeared to be leading with thirty votes. Corradini had opposed the Emperor's attempts at interference in the Papal States, and his attempt to name Hugh Francis von Fürstenberg as bishop of Hildesheim.

By the middle of May there was a series of earthquakes in Italy. The tension was high, both inside and outside the Conclave, as many interpreted the earthquakes as evidence of God's displeasure at the failure of the Cardinals to elect a Pope.

== Results ==
Eventually Cardinal Cienfuegos persuaded the Germans to accept Corsini as an alternative to Corradini. The Spanish and French factions agreed. After months of contention, on July 12, 1730, Corsini was chosen and took the name of his patron, Clement XI. He was seventy-eight years of age at the time of his election and would rule for nearly ten years. One of Clement's first actions was to create a commission to investigate charges of embezzlement by various officials under his predecessor.

== Sources ==
- Ludwig von Pastor : History of the Popes. T. 34. St. Louis: 1941. ( ang. )
- Remigius Ritzler: Hierarchy Catholica. T. VI. Padova 1958. ( Lat. )
- Ferdinando Petruccelli della Gattina: Histoire diplomatique des conclaves. T. 4. Brussels: 1864 ( fr. )
