= Pierre Imperiali =

Belgian politician

The Marquis Pierre Guillaume Imperiali des Princes de Francavilla (17 May 1874 – 10 January 1940) was a Belgian politician. As a member of the Catholic Party, he sat in the Belgian Parliament as a member of the Chamber of Representatives (1912–1919), and later of the Senate (1919-1925). He was known as the creator of the Imperiali election system, which he proposed in 1921. The Imperiali system is designed to disadvantage small political lists as compared to lists that receive a significant number of votes.

The Imperiali quota is one of the quotas that are used in the Imperiali election system.
