= Imperiali quota =

Formula in proportional-representation voting

The Imperiali quota or pseudoquota is an unusually-low electoral quota named after Belgian senator Pierre Imperiali. Some election laws used in largest remainder systems mandate it as the portion of votes needed to guarantee a seat.

The Czech Republic and Belgium are the only countries that currently use the Imperiali quota, while Italy and Ecuador used it in the past.. Belgium only uses the Imperiali quota for local elections.

The pseudoquota is unpopular because of its logically incoherent nature: it is possible for elections using the Imperiali quota to have more candidates pass quota than open seats. When more pass quota than the number of open seats, the issue must be resolved using a different method to allocate seats. This method can be as simple as using relative standing in the votes (plurality). Fair allocation of seats can also be done by using the largest remainder rule.

In some cases, the use of the Imperiali quota distributes seats in a way that is a hybrid between majoritarian and proportional representation, rather than providing actual proportional representation.

Being smaller than the Droop quota and much smaller than the Hare quota, it primarily aids more popular parties as they may get more seats with the same votes. More-popular parties do not suffer from vote splitting that might deny them additional seats. In addition, certain smaller parties might take a seat due to the Imperiali being lower than the Droop (or Hare), when the same party might be locked out of representation under the Hare or Droop.

The Imperiali quota is a part of the Imperiali seat-allocation method of increasingly smaller quotas used in Belgium local elections.

== Formula ==
The Imperiali quota may be given as:

$$\frac{\mbox{votes}}{\mbox{seats}+2}$$

- votes = the number of valid (unspoiled) votes cast in an election.
- seats = the number of seats on the legislature or committee.

However, Imperiali violates the inequality for a valid fixed quota:

$\frac{\mbox{votes}}{\mbox{seats}+1} \leq \mbox{electoral quota} \leq \frac{\mbox{votes}}{\mbox{seats}-1}$

By some definitions, a valid fixed quota is a number larger than votes/seats+1 and equal to or smaller than votes/seats minus 1. Imperiali, being smaller than votes/seats+1, is smaller than this window.

It can lead to impossible allocations that assign parties one or two seats more than exist.

== An example of use in Single transferable vote (STV) ==
To see how the Imperiali quota works in an STV election imagine an election in which there are two seats to be filled and three candidates: Andrea, Chris and Drew. There are 100 voters as follows:

65 voters

1. Andrea
2. Chris

15 voters

1. Chris
2. Andrea

20 voters

1. Drew

There are 100 voters and 2 seats. The Imperiali quota is therefore:

$$\frac{100}{2+2} = 25$$

To begin the count the first preferences cast for each candidate are tallied and are as follows:

- Andrea: 65
- Drew: 20
- Chris: 15

Andrea has reached the quota and is declared elected. He has 40 votes more than the quota so these surplus votes are transferred. They go to Chris. The tallies therefore become:

- Chris: 55
- Drew: 20

Chris has now reached the quota so is declared elected. The winners are therefore Andrea and Chris. The use of the Imperiali quota thus did not prevent fair voting. The vote transfer ensured that the voting block that preferred Andrea and Chris did not suffer from vote splitting.

If two candidates had achieved quota on the first count, say each with 35 percent of the vote, there would have been no votes transferred and the two seats would have been filled by the use of 70 percent of the votes cast.

If by chance all candidates achieved or surpassed quota on the first count, the two seats then could have been allocated just based on relative vote tallies; in case of a tie, by a coin toss or some other method.
