= Medici Vase =

The Medici Vase on Display in the Galleria degli Uffizi in Florence

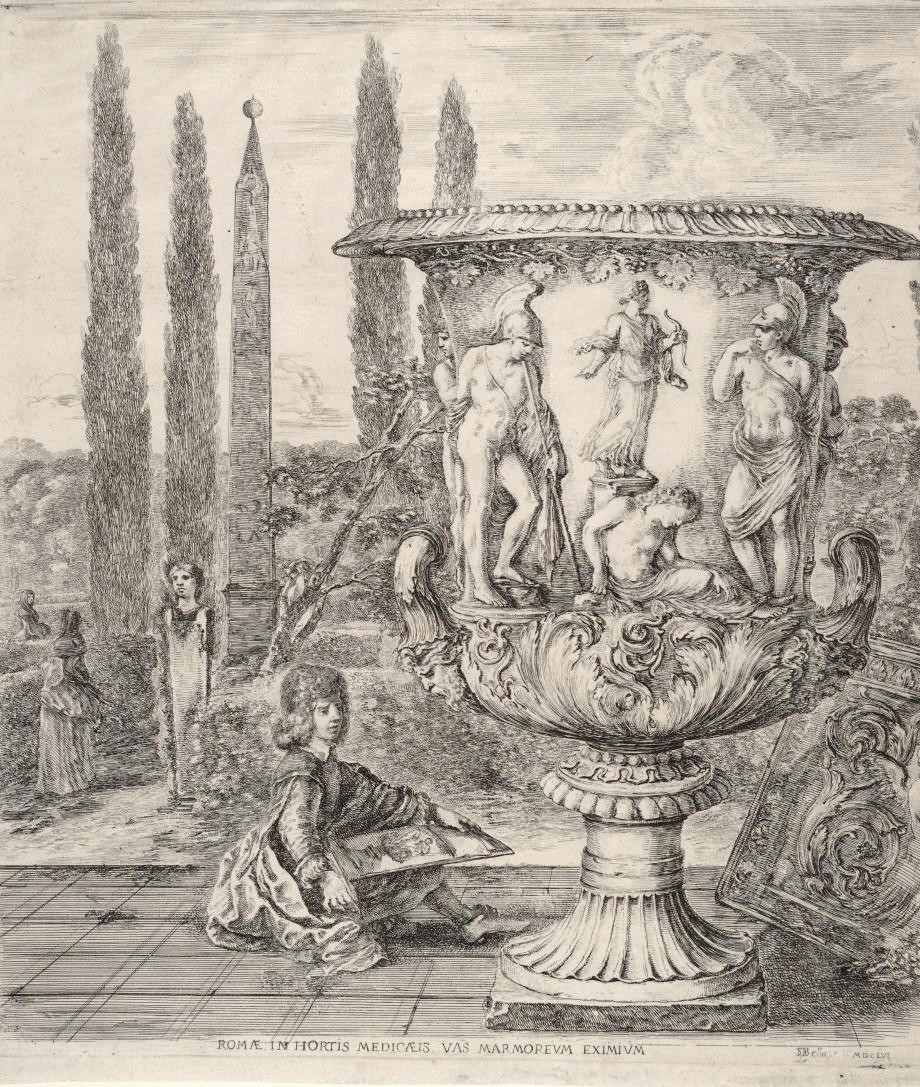
Etching by Stefano della Bella (1656); the young Grand Duke Cosimo III drawing the vase at the Villa Medici, Rome

The Medici Vase is a monumental marble bell-shaped krater sculpted in Athens in the second half of the 1st century AD as a garden ornament for the Roman market. It is now in the Uffizi Gallery in Florence.

== Description ==
Standing 1.52 metres (approximately 5 feet) tall, with a gadrooned everted lip, it has a deep frieze carved with a mythological bas-relief that defies secure identification: a half-draped female figure Iphigenia seated below a statue of a goddess on a high plinth, restored as Diana, with heroic warriors on either side, perhaps Agamemnon and either Achilles or Odysseus standing to either side. Two fluted loop handles rise from satyrs' heads on either side of the acanthus-leaf carved base, and it stands on a spreading gadrooned base on a low square plinth.

== History ==
The vase reappeared in the 1598 inventory of the Villa Medici, Rome, but its origin is unknown. Transferred from the villa in 1780, it has ever since been displayed in the Uffizi Gallery, today in the first-floor Verone sull’Arno overlooking the River Arno. It was often illustrated in engravings, the most famous of which is by Stefano della Bella (1656); he depicted the young Medici heir who would become Grand Duke Cosimo III seated, drawing the vase.

Often paired as garden ornaments since the later 17th century with the similar Borghese Vase, (Note: The difference in height between the Medici vase and the Borghese vase amount to about two centimeters; see paired early 19th-century bronze vases. Both were available in artificial Lithodipyra (Coade stone) from 1771. The Medici Vase from the pair ordered from Eleanor Coade for George IV is at the Royal Botanic Gardens, Kew (Alison Kelly, "Coade Stone in Georgian Gardens", Garden History 16.2 (Autumn 1988:109–133) p 111.) they are two of the most admired and influential vases from antiquity. The place of the Medici Vase in the Western canon of Greek and Roman remains may be gauged by its prominent position in the composed views or capricci that were a specialty of the Roman painter Giovanni Paolo Panini, to pick the outstanding example. (Note: Panini's composed View of Roman Monuments, featuring the Medici Vase, at the Philadelphia Museum of Art is illustrated in Richard Paul Wunder, "Panini's View of Roman Monuments", Philadelphia Museum of Art Bulletin 56 (Winter 1961:54–56) p. 55; in the catalogue of the most influential Roman antiquities in Francis Haskell and Nicholas Penny, Taste and the Antique: The Lure of Classical Sculpture 1500–1900 (1981) the Medici Vase is cat. no. 82.) Angelica Kauffman painted the second Lord Berwick on his Grand Tour seated beside the vase. (Note: The Angelica Kauffman portrait of the second Lord Berwick seated beside the vase is at Attingham Park (National Trust): noted in Wendy Wassyng Roworth, "Painting for Profit and Pleasure: Angelica Kauffman and the Art Business in Rome" Eighteenth-Century Studies 29.2 (Winter 1995/1996:225-228) p. 226.)

Many "copies", sometimes rather loose, were made to decorate palaces or their gardens. The Medici Vase remains a popular subject for imitation in bronze or porcelain, for example by Wedgwood. Material on the many later decorative versions of the pairing can be found at Borghese Vase.

== Copies ==
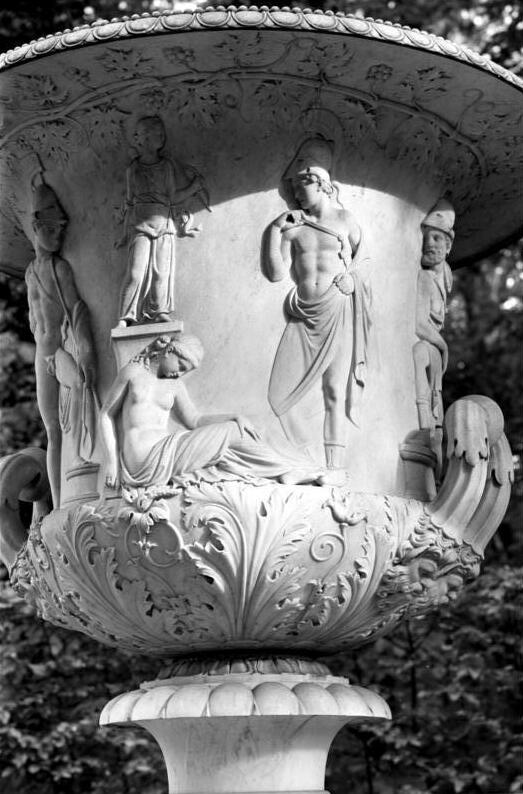
Potsdam, Sanssouci

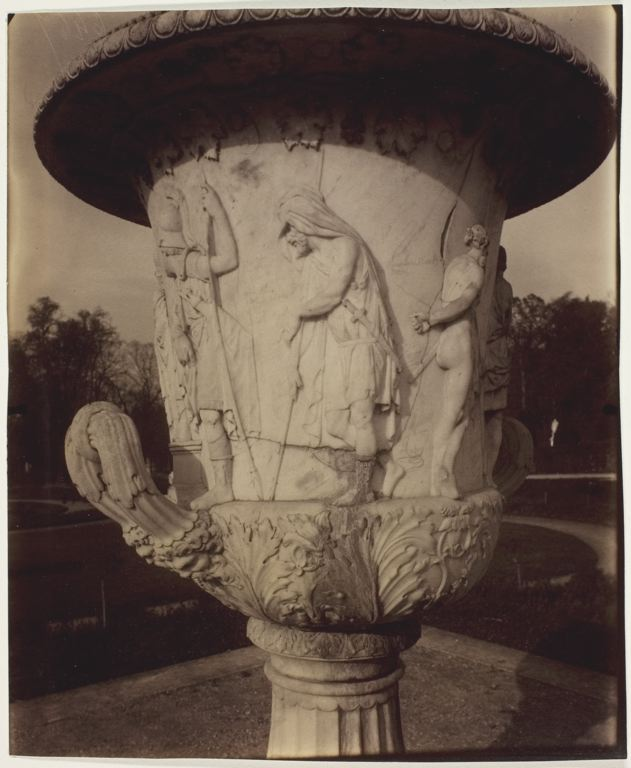
Eugène Atget photographs the Palace of Versailles

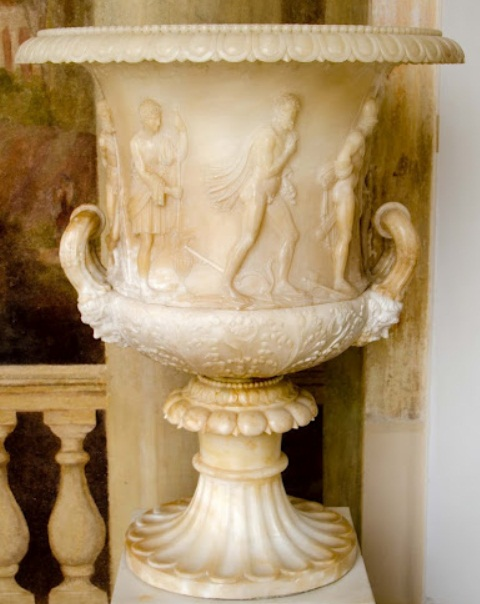
Wilanów Palace, Poland

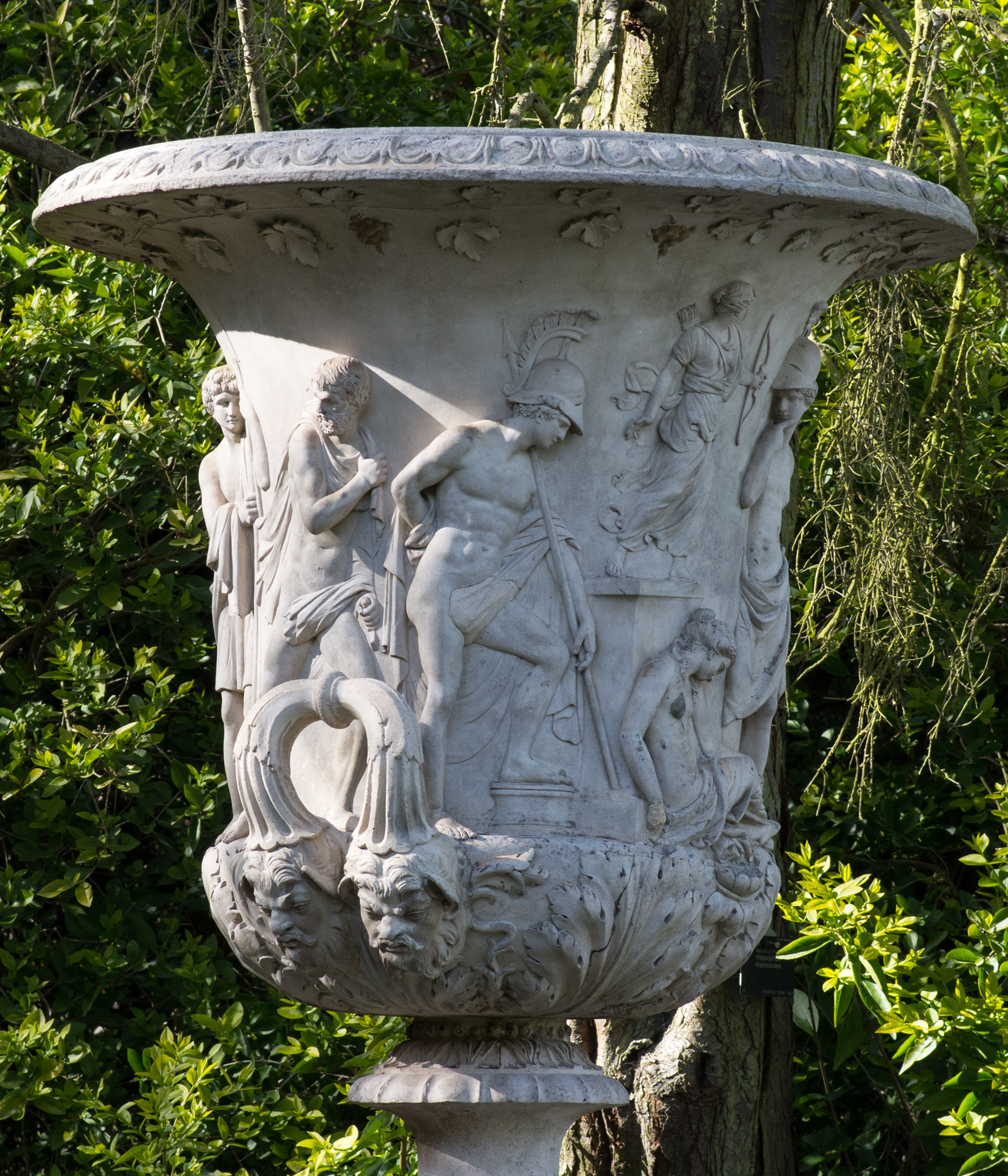
Kew Gardens, London

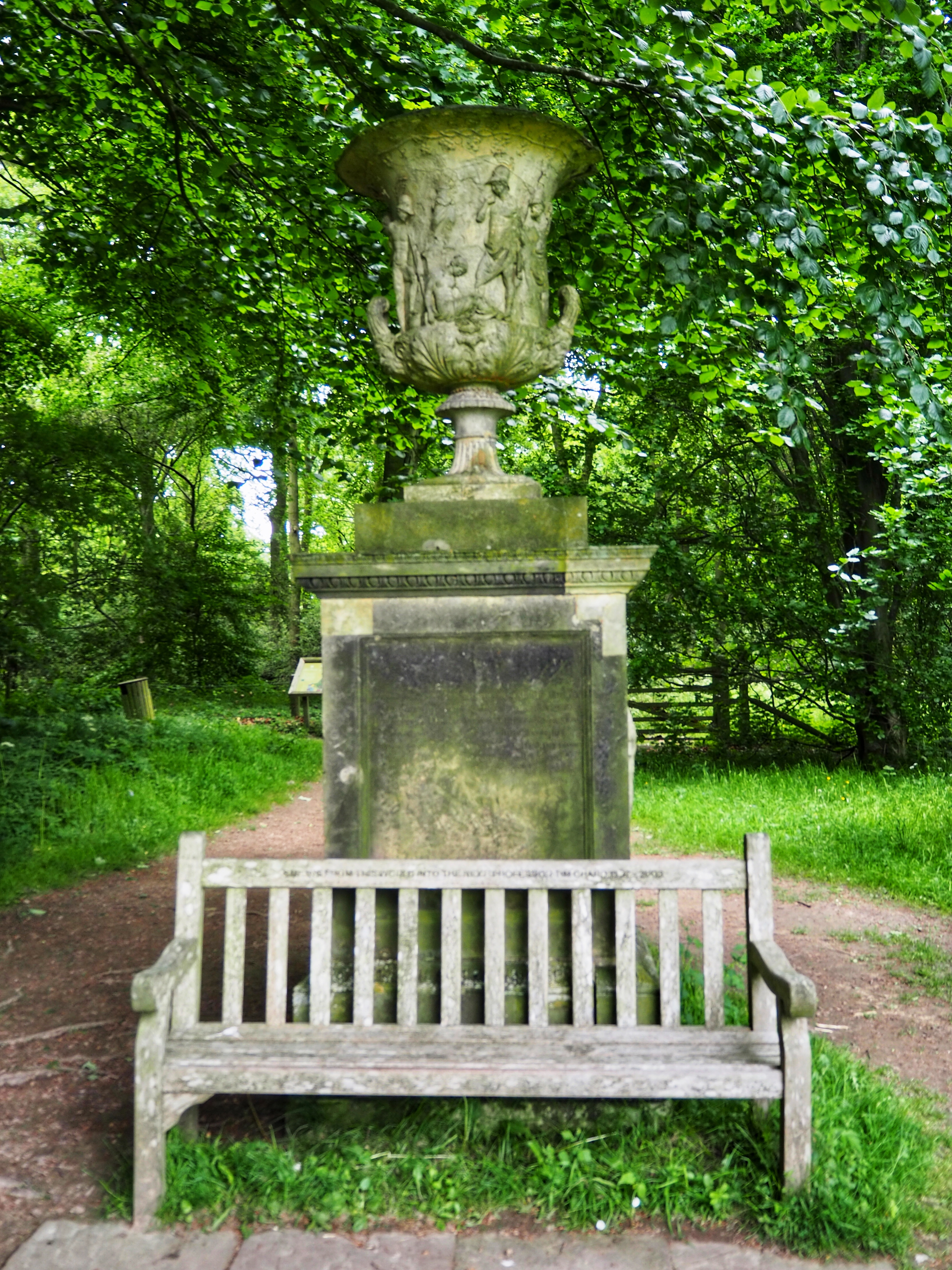
Castle Howard, North Yorkshire

== See also ==
- Medici lions
