= Borghese Vase =

Ancient marble krater

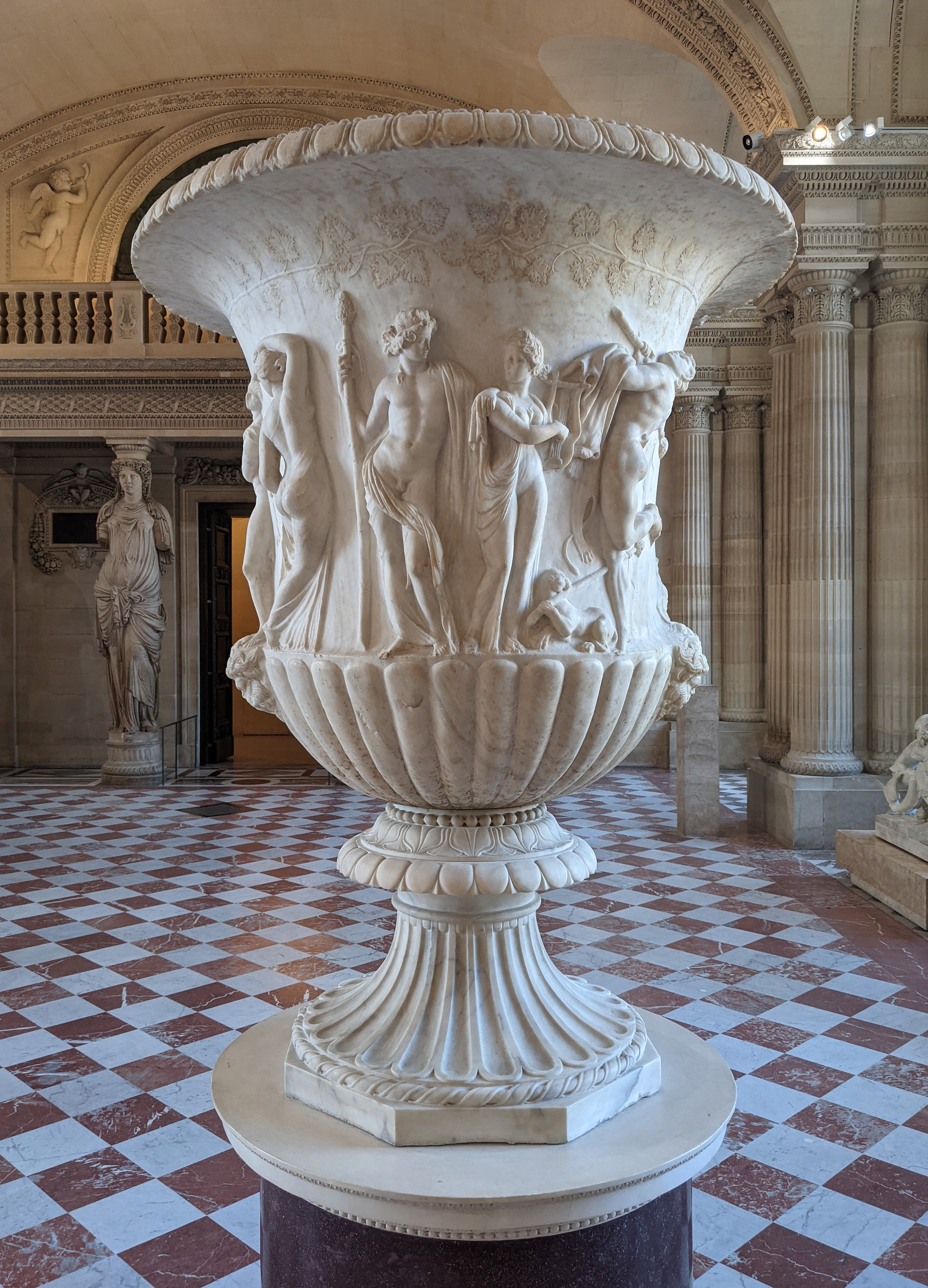
The Borghese Vase in the Daru Gallery, Louvre Museum

The Borghese Vase is a monumental bell-shaped krater sculpted in Athens from Pentelic marble in the second half of the 1st century BC as a garden ornament for the Roman market; it is now in the Louvre Museum.

== Original ==
=== Iconography ===
Standing 1.72 metres tall and with a diameter of 1.35 m., the vase has a deep frieze with bas-reliefs and an everted gadrooned lip over a gadrooned lower section, where paired satyrs' heads mark the former placement of loop handles; it stands on a spreading fluted stem with a cabled motif round its base, on a low octagonal plinth.

The frieze depicts the thiasus, an ecstatic Bacchanalian procession accompanying Dionysus, draped with the panther skin and playing the aulos, and Ariadne. However, the accompanying figures, often said to be satyrs, have neither the common characteristics of cloven feet nor equine tails flowing to the floor as typically shown on Greek pottery; some references identify the figures as sileni. The draped figures are often said to be Maenads but are clearly not: Maenads are women who accompany Dionysus but on the vase a draped male figure is depicted. One of the figures is shown being anointed, typically a symbolic act of divinity, leading to the interpretation of some of the figures as Apollo and Dionysus rescuing Silenus who is shown falling down reaching for a spilled flagon of wine. This scene on the vase corresponds to the saying "The Gods look after children and drunken men" which has been passed down orally through many generations. Many copies of the vase do not correctly depict the scene, replacing Dionysus with a female figure on the wrongful assumption that a sexual act is in progress.

=== Rediscovery ===
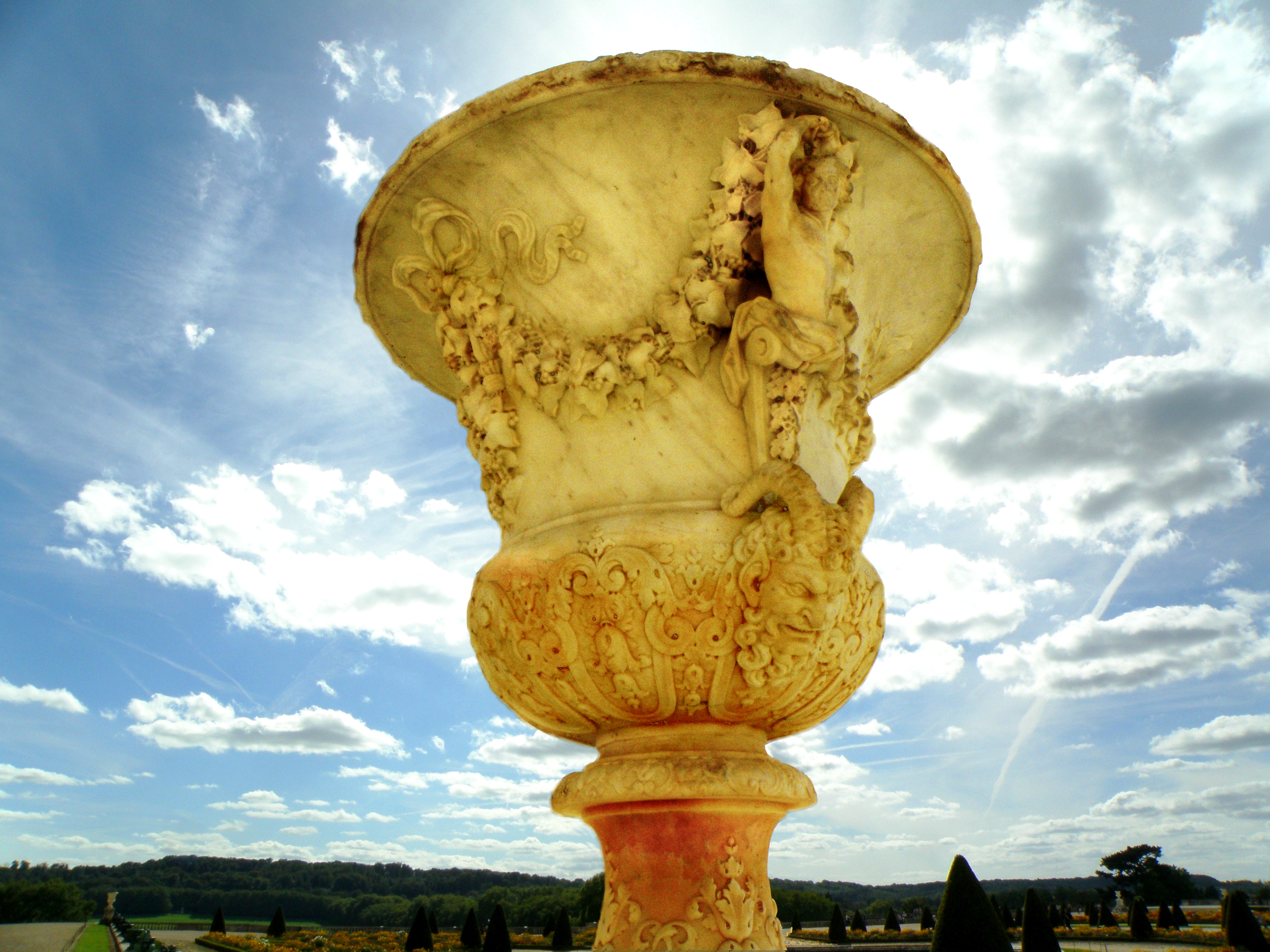
Vase in Borghese style at the gardens of Versailles

The vase was rediscovered in a Roman garden that occupied part of the site of the gardens of Sallust in 1566 and acquired by the Borghese family. Napoleon bought it from his brother-in-law Camillo Borghese in 1808, and it has been displayed in the Louvre since 1811.

In his capriccio shown below, the French artist Hubert Robert embellished and enlarged the Borghese Vase for dramatic effect and set it, in atmospherically ruinous condition, on the Aventine overlooking the Colosseum, a position it never occupied. Robert also painted it in several other settings, including the gardens of Versailles (L'entrée du Tapis Vert) with Marie Antoinette and Louis XVI.

== Copies ==
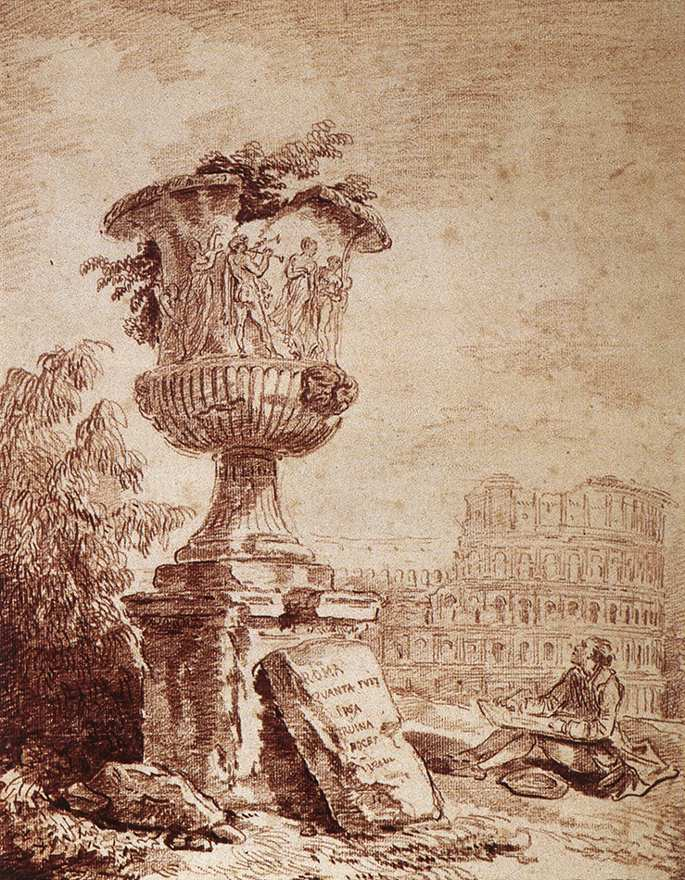
Capriccio: draughtsman sketching the Borghese Vase, red chalk, Hubert Robert, c. 1775

Often paired and rescaled to balance the slightly smaller Medici Vase, it is one of the most admired and influential marble vases from antiquity, forms that satisfied the Baroque and neoclassical approach to classical art alike. Three pairs were copied for the Bassin de Latone in the gardens of Versailles; alabaster pairs stand in the Great Hall at Houghton Hall, Norfolk; and bronze ones at Osterley Park, Middlesex. On a reduced scale, the vases made admirable wine coolers in silver, or in silver-gilt, as Paul Storr delivered them to the Prince Regent in 1808 (Haskell and Penny 1981:315). John Flaxman based a bas-relief on the frieze of the Borghese Vase (Sir John Soane's Museum, London). As decorative objects they have been reproduced through the eighteenth and nineteenth centuries and remain popular subjects for imitation in bronze or porcelain, for example in Coade stone (a reduced-size Coade stone example dating from 1770-1771 stands in the Temple of Flora at Stourhead), and also in jasper ware by Josiah Wedgwood (c. 1790), who adapted the form of the Medici Vase for the bas-reliefs and provided it with a lid and a neoclassical drum pedestal.

== Sources ==
- Haskell, Francis; Penny, Nicholas (1981). Taste and the Antique : the Lure of Classical Sculpture, 1500-1900. Yale University Press. p. 315. ISBN 978-0-300-02641-2.
