= Krater =

Large vase in Ancient Greece

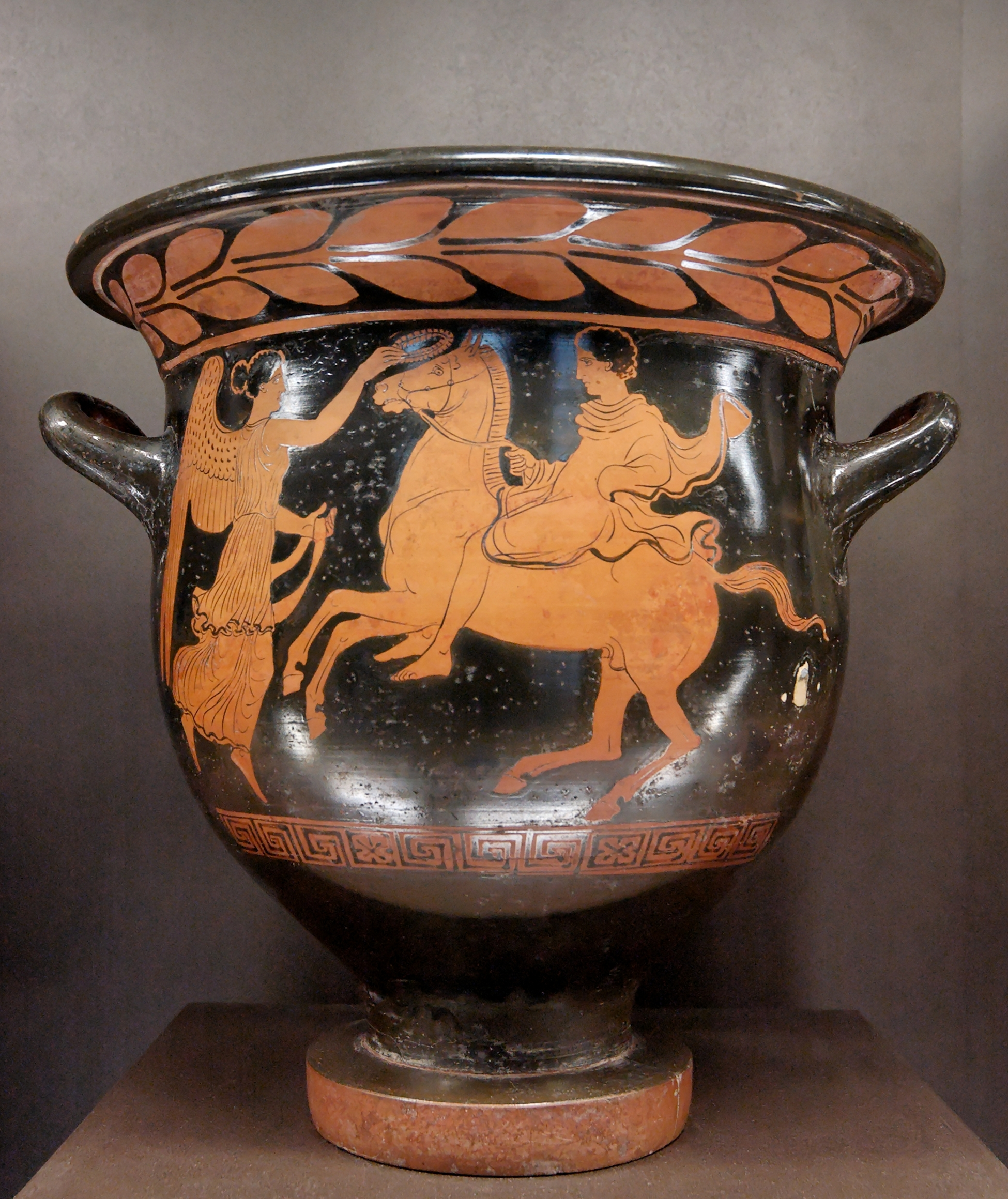
- Young rider crowned by a winged Nike (Victory), by Sisyphus Painter, c. 420 BC, in the Louvre
- Material: Ceramic
- Created: Multiple cultures, originating predominantly in Greece and exported
- Period/culture: A vaseform of the Bronze Age and the Iron Age
- Place: Circum-Mediterranean

A krater or crater (Ancient Greek: κρατήρ, romanized: kratḗr, lit. 'mixing vessel', IPA: [kraːtɛ̌ːr]; Latin: crater, IPA: [ˈkraːteːr]) was a large two-handled type of vase in Ancient Greek pottery and metalwork, mostly used for the mixing of wine with water.

== Form and function ==
At a Greek symposium, kraters were placed in the center of the room. They were quite large, so they were not easily portable when filled. Thus, the wine-water mixture would be withdrawn from the krater with other vessels, such as a kyathos (pl.: kyathoi), an amphoreus (pl.: amphoreis), or a kylix (pl.: kylikes). In fact, Homer's Odyssey describes a steward drawing wine from a krater at a banquet and then running to and fro pouring the wine into guests' drinking cups. The modern Greek word now used for undiluted wine, krasi (κρασί), originates from the krasis (κράσις, lit. 'mixing') of wine and water in kraters.

Pottery kraters were glazed on the interior to make the surface of the clay more impervious for holding water, and possibly for aesthetic reasons, since the interior could easily be seen. The exterior of kraters often depicted scenes from Greek life, such as the Attic Late 1 Krater, which was made between 760 and 735 B.C.E. This object was found among other funeral objects, and its exterior depicted a funeral procession to the gravesite.

== Usage ==
At the beginning of each symposium a symposiarch (συμποσίαρχος, symposíarchos, 'lord of the common drink'), was elected by the participants. He would then assume control of the wine servants, and thus of the degree of wine dilution and how it changed during the party, and the rate of cup refills. The krater and how it was filled and emptied was thus the centerpiece of the symposiarch's authority. An astute symposiarch should be able to diagnose the degree of inebriation of his fellow symposiasts and make sure that the symposium progressed smoothly and without drunken excess.

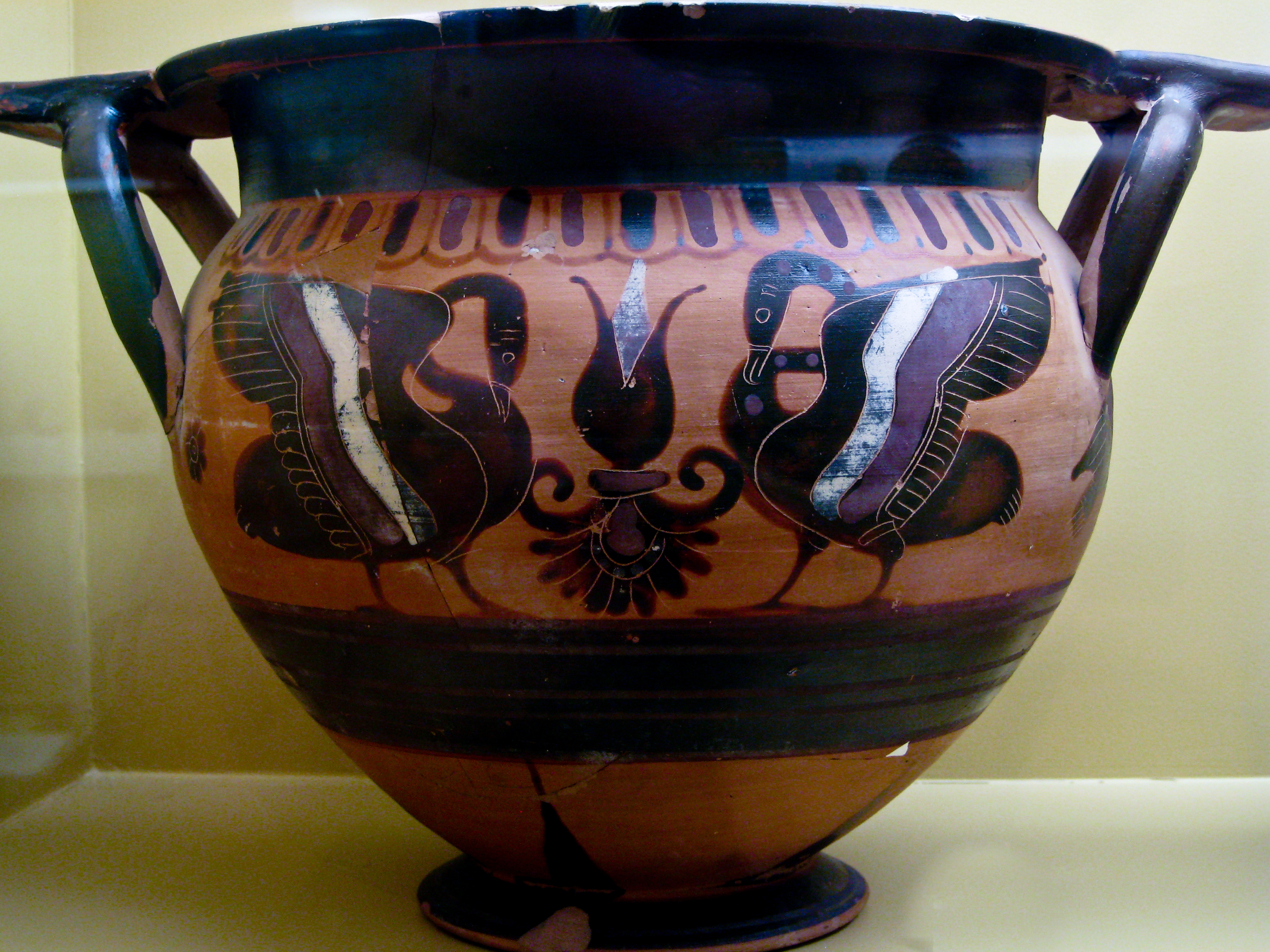
Manner of Lydos, black-figure column crater depicting swans, c. 550 BC, Museum of the Ancient Agora, Athens

== Forms ==
=== Column krater (kelébe) ===
This form originated in Corinth in the seventh century BC, but was taken over by the Athenians where it is typically black-figure. They ranged in size from 35 centimetres (14 in) to 56 centimetres (22 in) in height and were usually thrown in three pieces: the body/shoulder area, the base, and the neck/lip/rim. The handles were pulled separately. They were studied by archaeologist Tomris Bakır.

=== Calyx krater ===
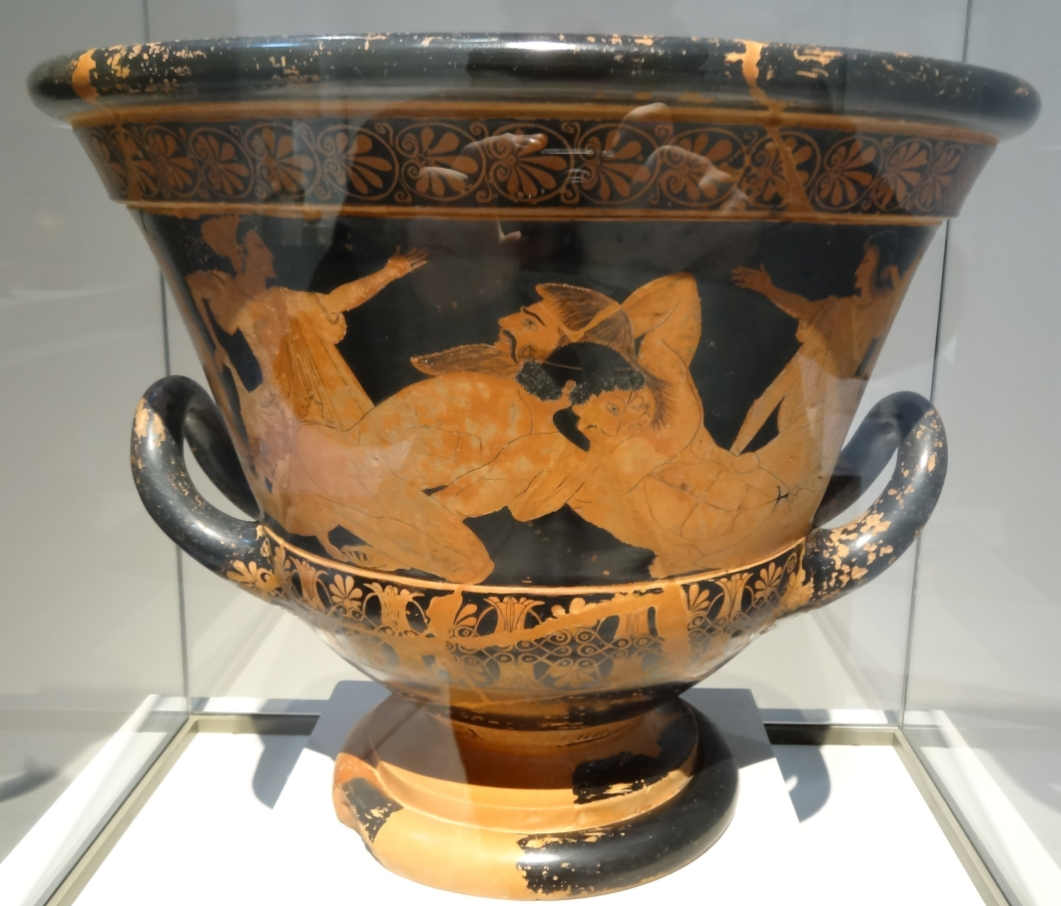
Euphronios & Euxitheos, Cratère attique à figures rouges, 515–510 BC, Louvre

These are among the largest of the kraters, supposedly developed by the potter Exekias in black-figure style, though in fact almost always seen in red. The lower body is shaped like the calyx of a flower, and the foot is stepped. The psykter-shaped vase fits inside it so well stylistically that it has been suggested that the two might have often been made as a set. It is always made with two robust upturned handles positioned on opposite sides of the lower body or "cul".

=== Volute krater ===
This type of krater, defined by volute-shaped handles, was invented in Laconia in the early 6th century BC, then adopted by Attic potters. Its production was carried on by Greeks in Apulia until the end of the 4th century BC. Its shape and method of manufacture are similar to those of the column krater, but the handles are unique: to make each, the potter would have first made two side spirals ("volutes") as decorative disks, then attached a long thin slab of clay around them both forming a drum with flanged edges. This strip would then have been continued downward until the bottom of the handle, where the potter would have cut a U-shaped arch in the clay before attaching the handle to the body of the vase.

=== Bell krater ===
Bell kraters were first made in the early 5th century, which meant that it came later than the three other krater types. This form of krater looks like an inverted bell with handles that are faced up. Bell kraters are red-figure and not black-figure like the other kraters.

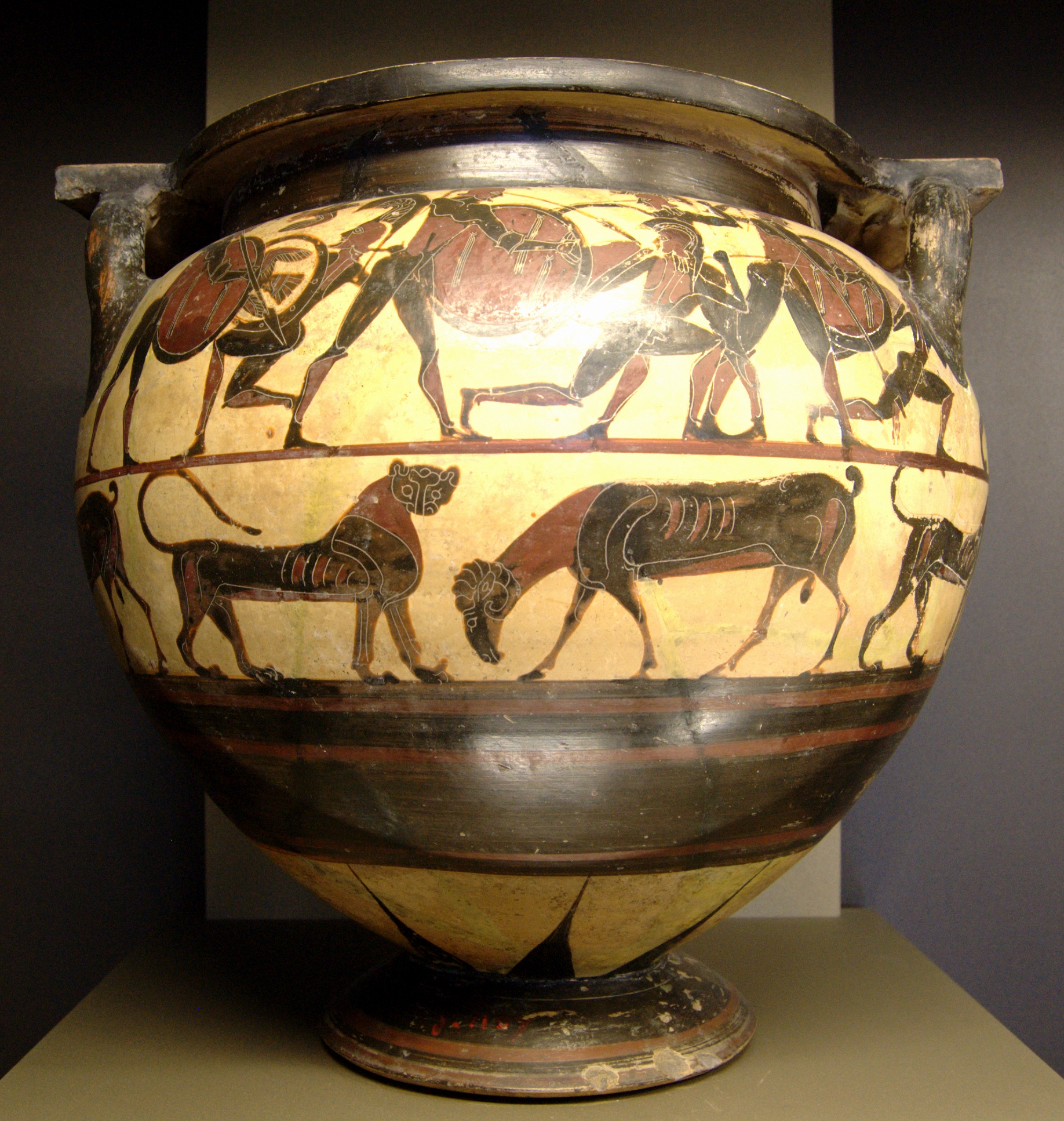
Column

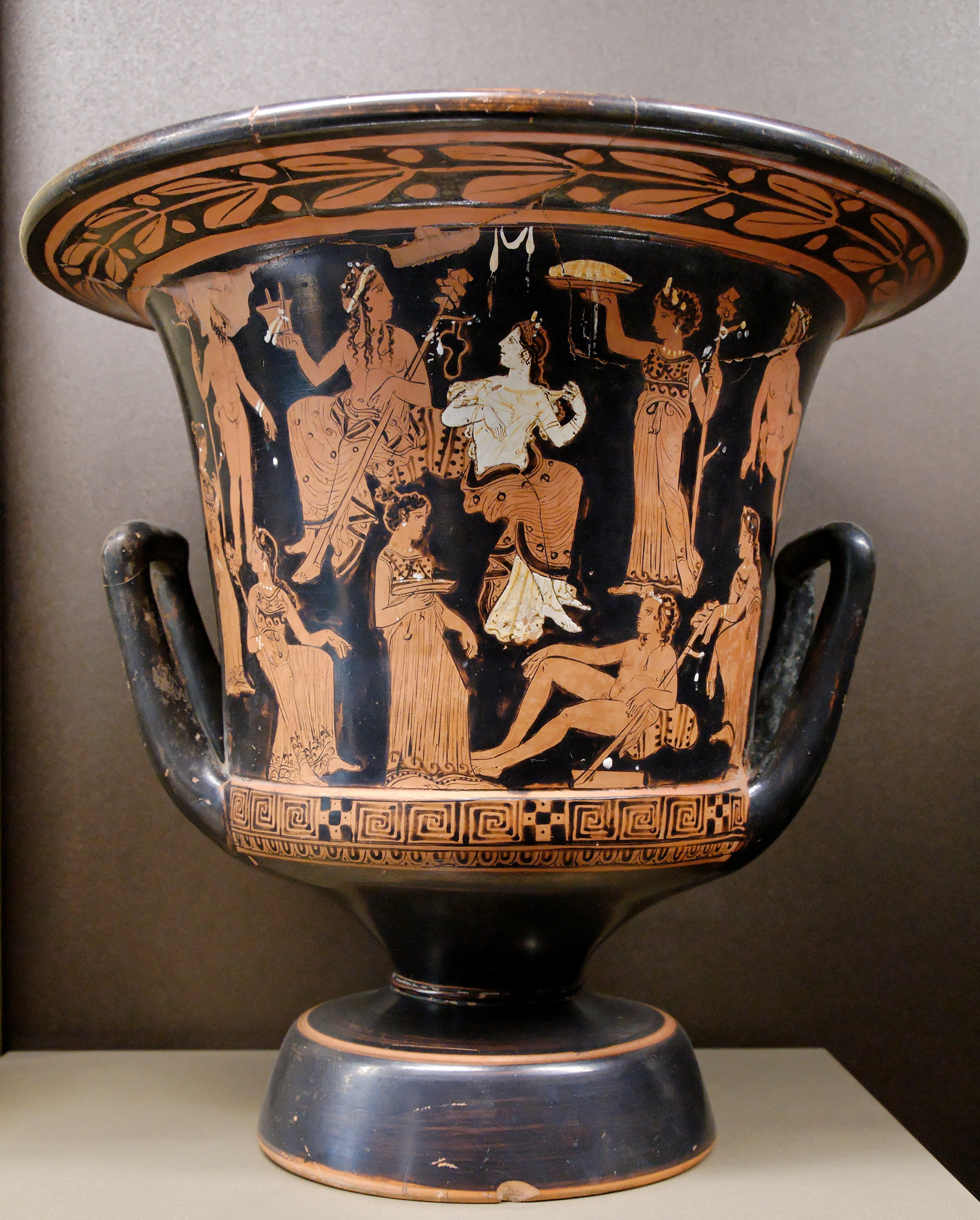
Calyx

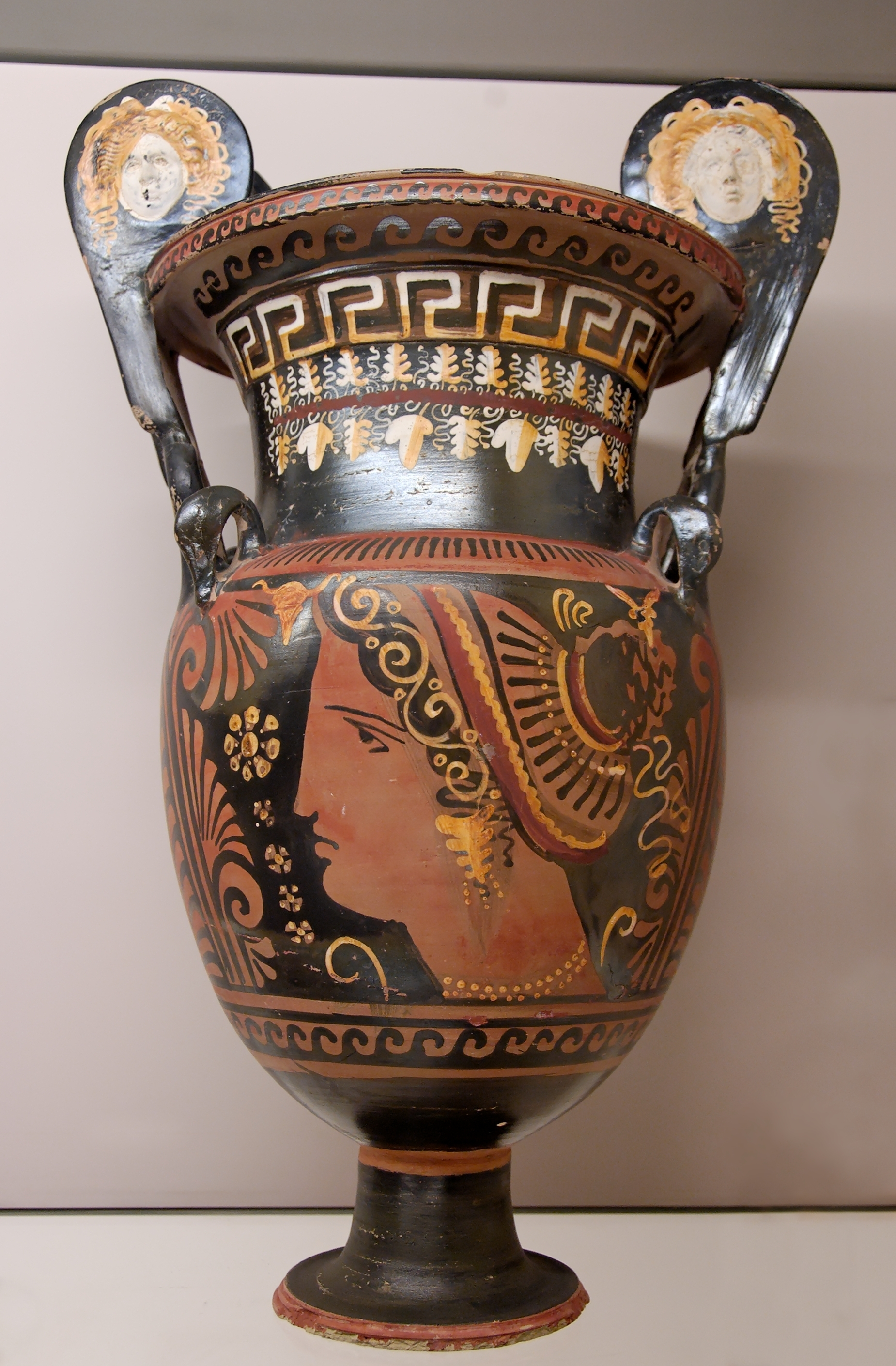
Volute

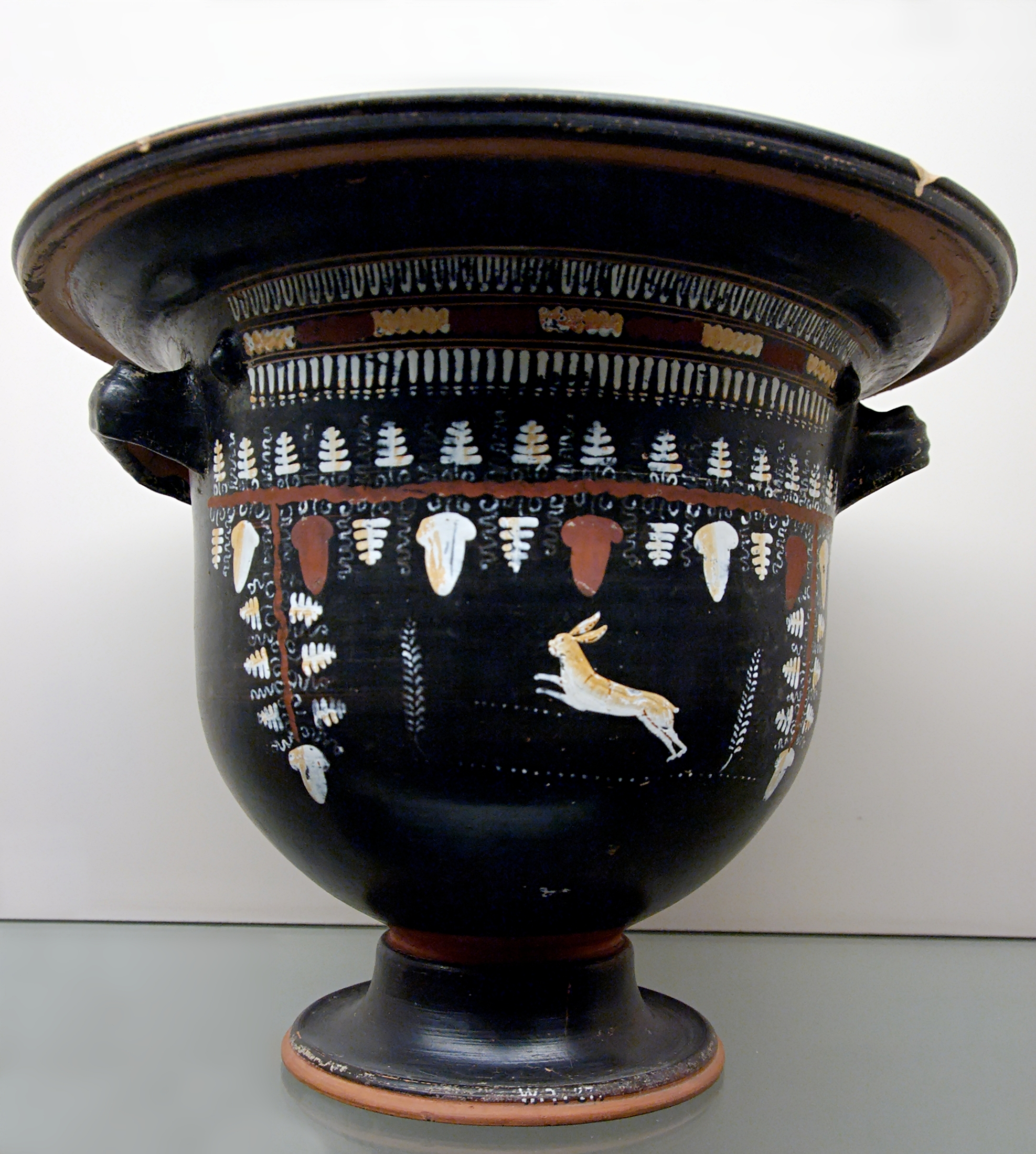
Bell

== Metal kraters ==
According to most scholars ceramic kraters imitated shapes designed initially for metal vessels; these were common in antiquity, but survivals are very rare, as the metal was recyclable. Among the largest and most famous metal kraters in antiquity were one in the possession of the Samian tyrant Polycrates, and another one dedicated by Croesus to the Delphic oracle. There are a few extant Archaic bronze kraters (or often only their handles), almost exclusively of the volute-type. Their main production centres were Sparta, Argos and Corinth, in Peloponnesus. During the Classical period the volute-type continued to be very popular along with the calyx-type, and beside the Corinthian workshop an Attic one was probably active. Exquisite exemplars of both volute- and calyx-kraters come from Macedonian 4th century BC graves. Among them the gilded Derveni Krater represents an exceptional chef d'œuvre of late Classical metalwork. The Vix bronze crater, found in a Celtic tomb in central France, is the largest known Greek krater, being 1.63 m in height and over 200 kg in weight. Others were in silver, which were too valuable and tempting to thieves to be buried in graves, and have not survived.

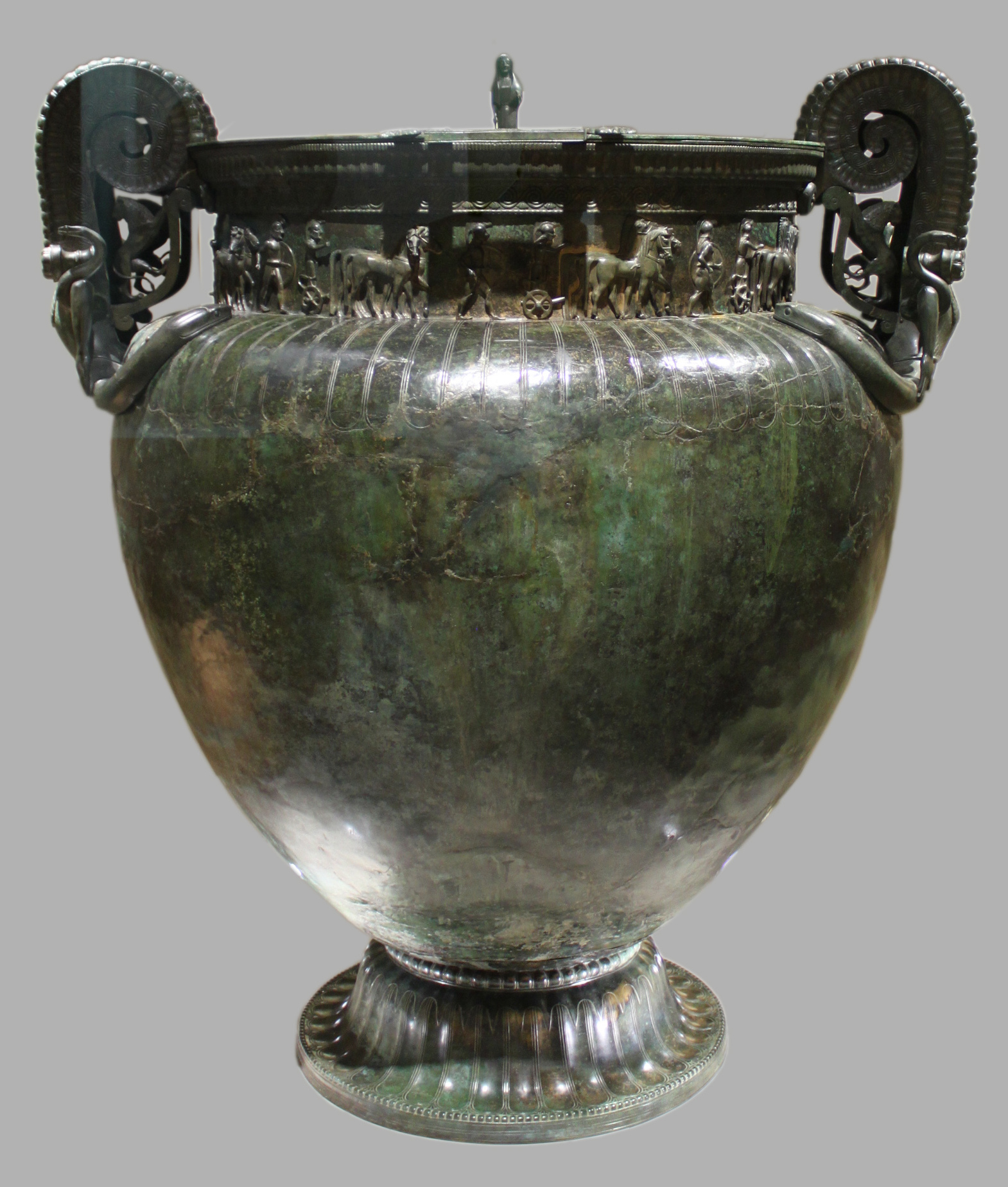
Vix Krater

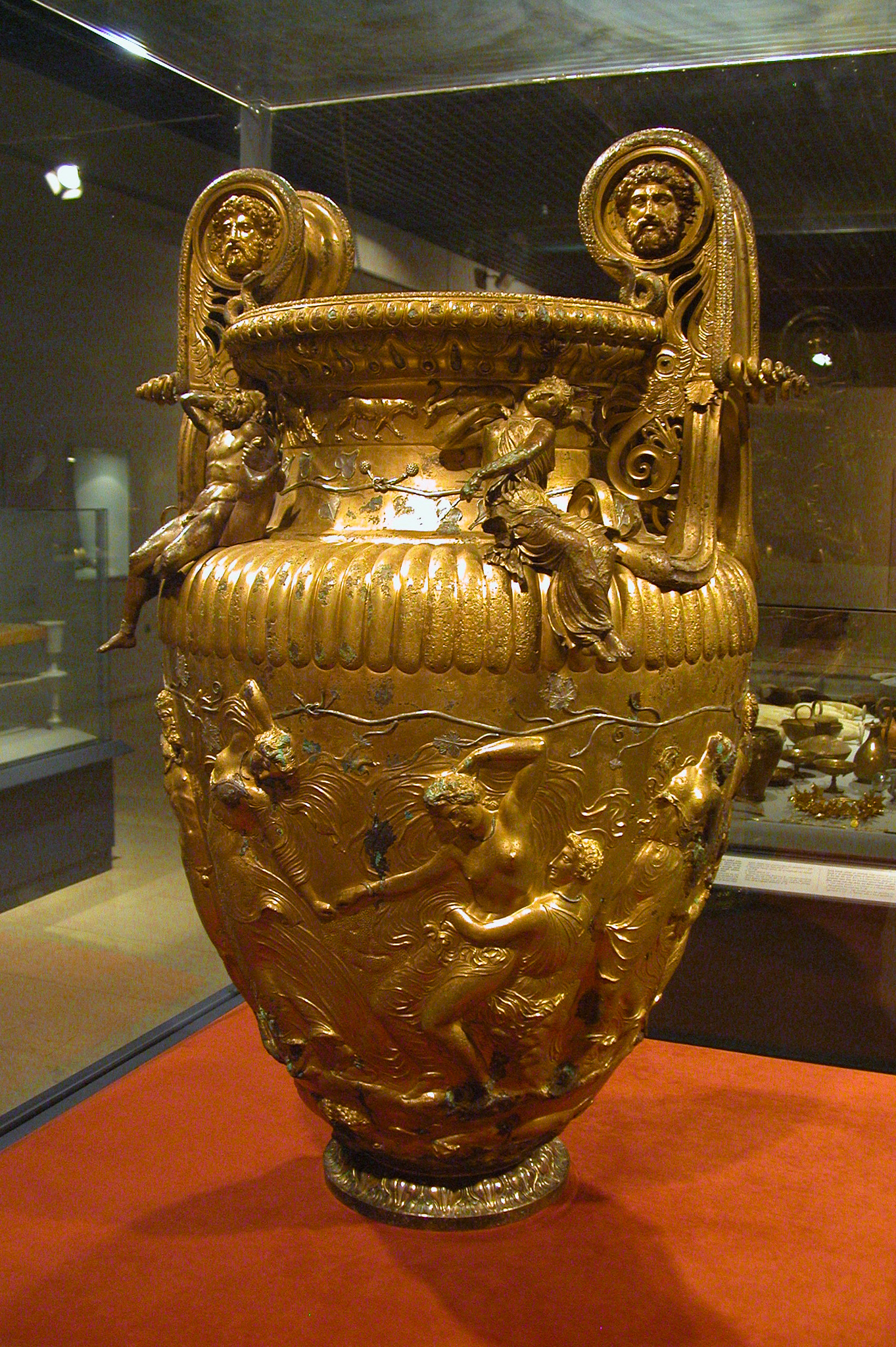
Derveni Krater

== Ornamental stone kraters ==
Ornamental stone kraters are known from Hellenistic times, the most famous being the Borghese Vase of Pentelic Marble and the Medici Vase, also of marble. After rediscovery of these pieces, imitations became a staple of garden decoration in the Baroque and Neoclassical periods. The French artist and landscape designer Hubert Robert included the Borghese Vase, both alone and together with other stone kraters, in several of his works.

== See also ==
- Wine accessory
- Wine tasting
- Kylix
