= Apulian vase painting =

Regional style of Italian vase painting

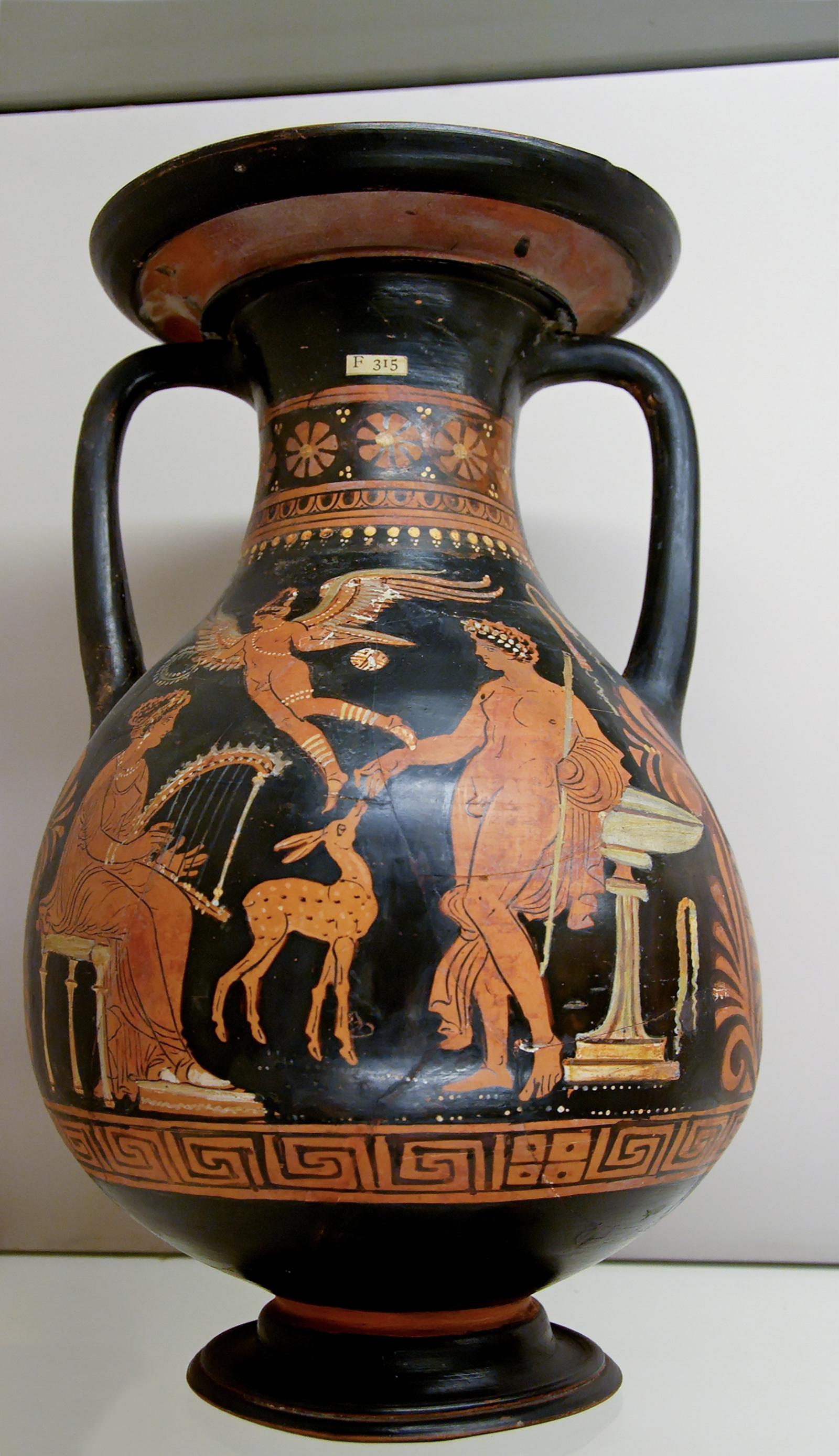
Pelike by a painter of the Tarrytown Group; Eros, a woman with a harp and a youth with a fawn; circa 320/310 BC.

Apulian vase painting was a regional style of Southern Italian vase painting from ancient Apulia in southeastern Italy. It comprises geometric pottery and red-figure pottery.

The legitimate Iron Age sequel to the Neolithic and Bronze Age culture of Matera and Molfetta has not yet been discovered and the pre-history of Daunia, Peucetia and Messapia begins to take shape as a coherent whole only with the 7th century BCE. Even then our knowledge is almost confined to the pottery, but it offers a rich field for study.

== Geometric pottery ==
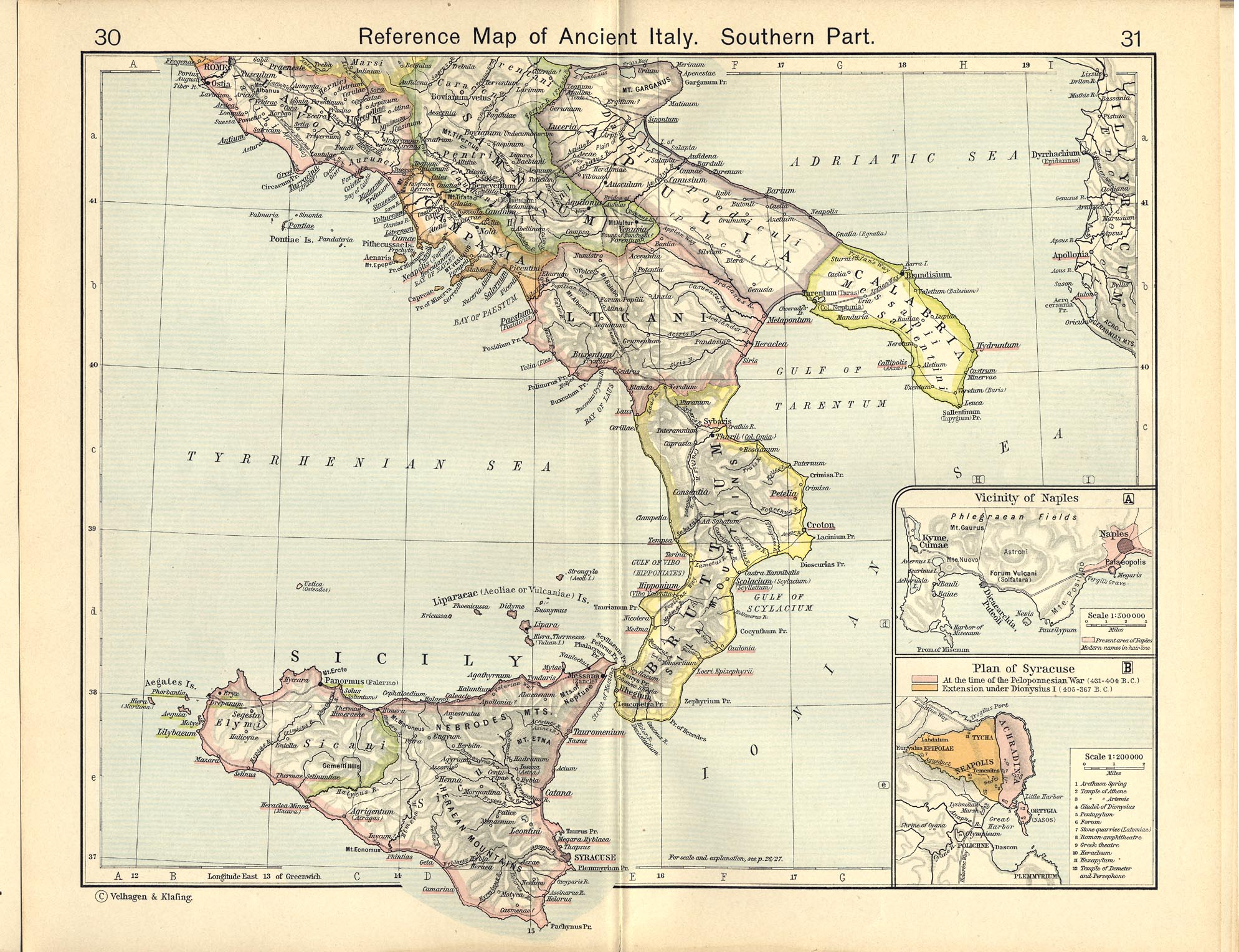
Reference Map of Ancient South Italy, with Apulia clearly visible at top

The subject of the painted pottery has been put on a scientific basis by the intensive studies of Maximilian Mayer, who has identified and distinguished the products of the several provincial schools, and has established a scheme of dating which, with some slight rectifications and adjustments, due principally to Italian archaeologist Michele Gervasio, may be considered as final. The division of schools corresponds very closely to the old pre-Roman distribution of the region into three sections. Of these the most northern is Daunia, extending from the promontory of Gargano to the most southern point in the course of the river Aufidus; next to which is Peucetia, which for purposes of this classification may be said to begin at Bari and end at Egnatia. South of a line drawn from Egnatia to Taranto, the whole heel of Italy, with Lecce at its centre, is Messapia.

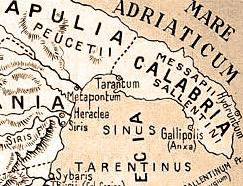
The heel of Italy with its ancient colonies

Each of these regions has its own peculiar and well marked style in pottery. The chronology of all three is not precisely concurrent; actually the Daunian school is dated from about 600 to 450BC and the Peucetian from 650 to 500BC, while the Messapian only begins at 500BC and lasts for two centuries. Wholly distinct is a much later Daunian school confined to Canosa, which belongs to the fourth and third centuries and may be called late-Canosan.

This chronology excludes any connection with the Mycenaean. Actually no single example of Mycenaean ware has ever been discovered between the Alps and the Gulf of Taranto. But at two places in Apulia, Mattinata on the promontory of Gargano and the Borgo Nuovo at Taranto, geometric pottery of the very early Iron Age has been found. These two isolated discoveries, however, have yet to be explained; they stand apart from all other Apulian products and their proper connections have not been ascertained. The pottery of Mattinata and of Borgo Nuovo is apparently a foreign importation and its date is several centuries earlier than that of the regular Apulian schools now to be described.

=== Apulian pottery schools ===
==== Daunian ====
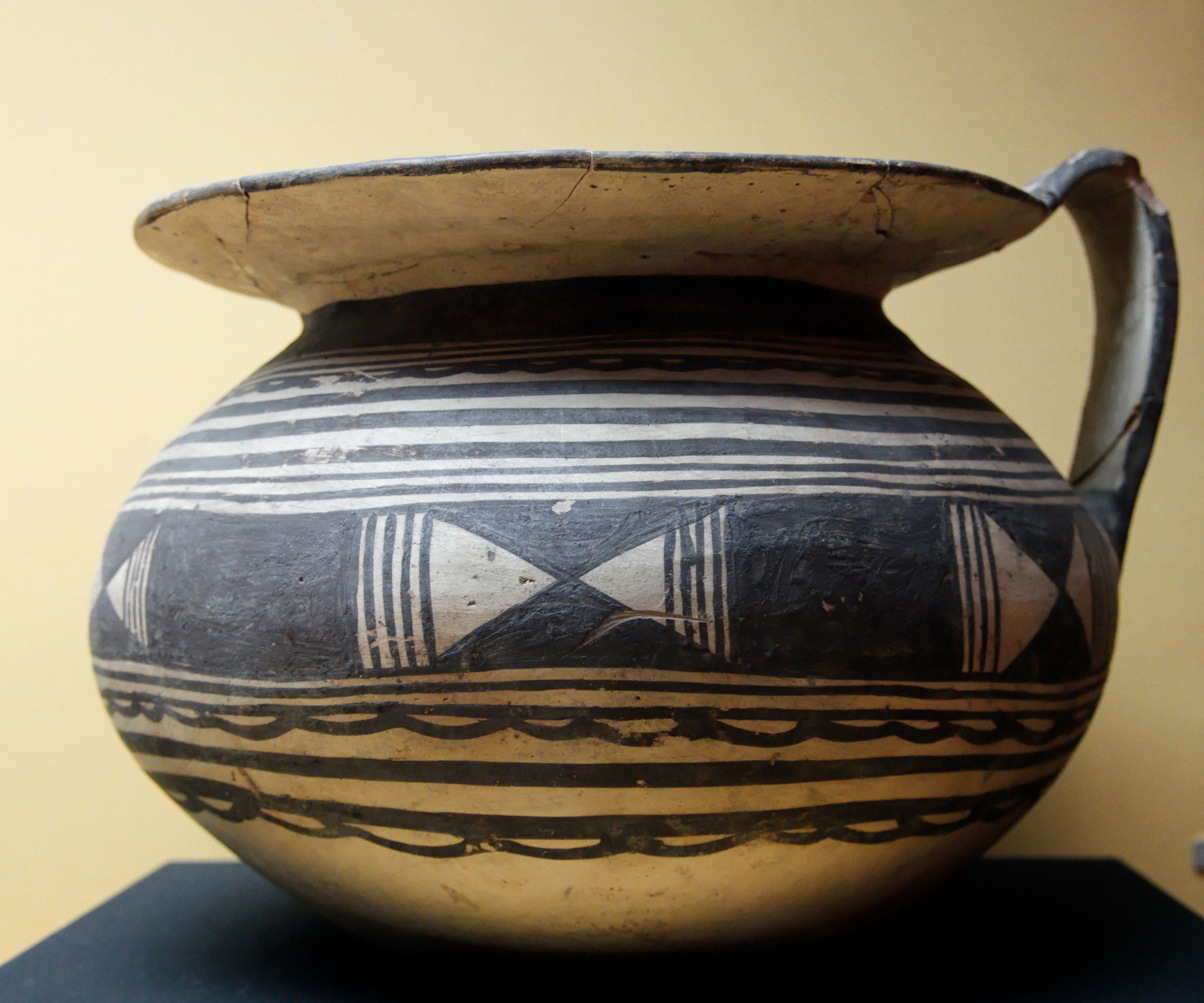
Example 1 – Daunian jug

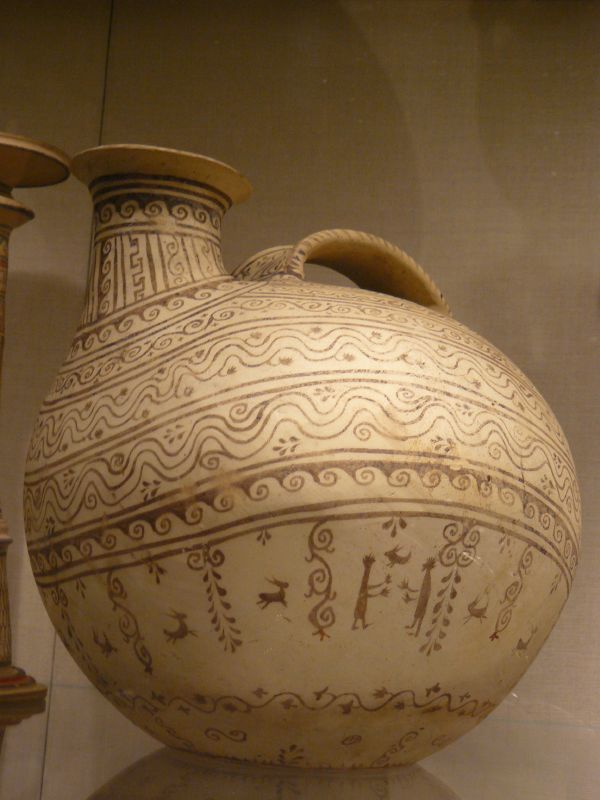
Example 2 – Daunian terracotta askos (flask with a spout and handle over the top)

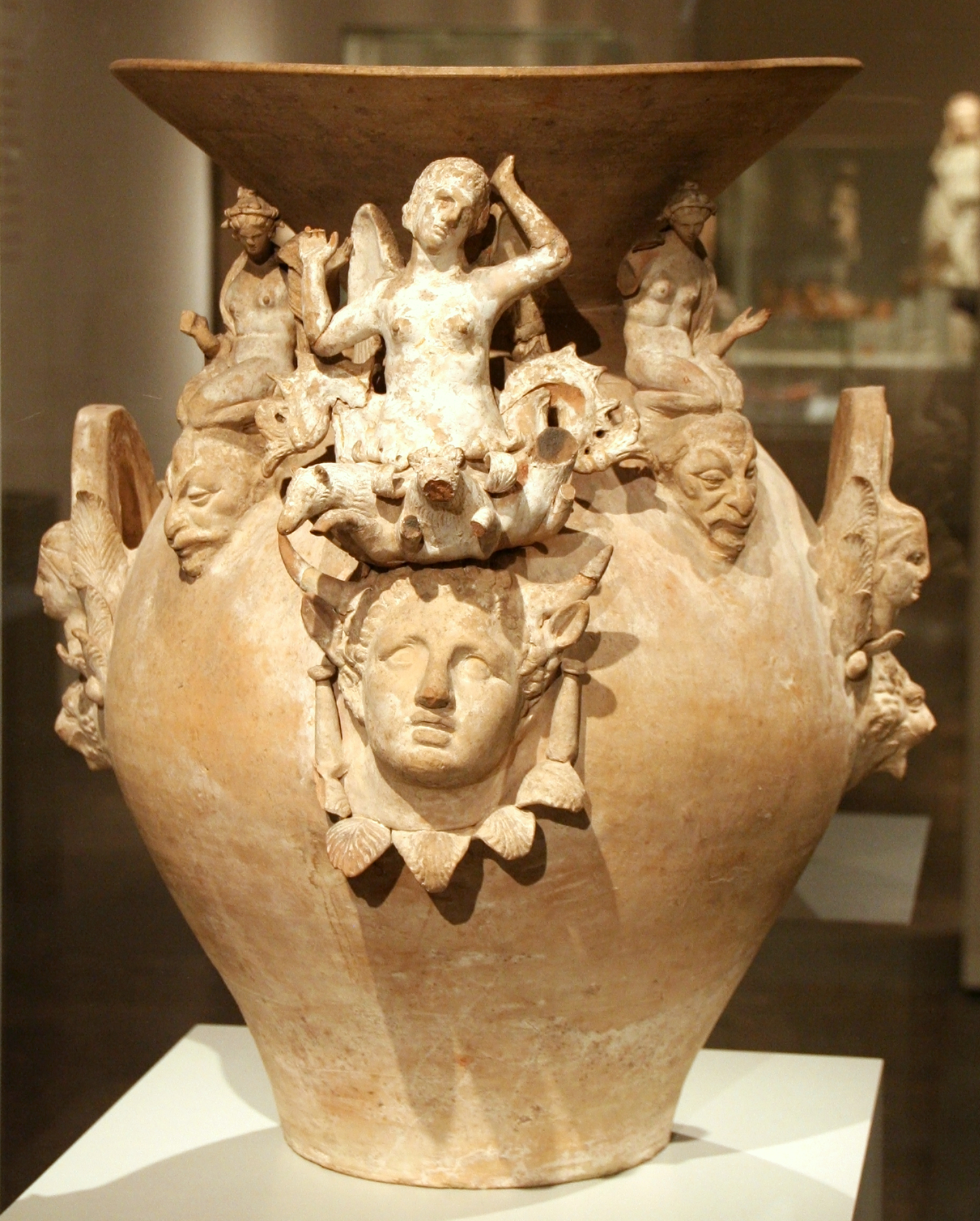
Example 3 – Daunian luxury vase (unpainted)

Canosa and Ruvo have yielded the greatest quantity of early Daunian pottery, and were perhaps the principal, though not the only centers for its production. It is found over the whole of Daunia from Bitonto in the south to Lucera and Teanum in the north, occasionally in Picenum, and even in Istria. In Campania also the site of Suessula has yielded several vases, produced apparently under Daunian influence.

There are four principal forms. The first is a round-bottomed footless krater with side handles and a plate-like rim (cf. example 1); the second is a similar krater on a pedestal. This latter is the shape known in Picenum, where its occurrence at Novilara puts its date at least as early as 600BC. From the round-bottomed krater is evolved the most peculiar and characteristic product of Canosa, that is, the double-storied jar. The plate-like rim has been developed into a deep bowl, which becomes more and more exaggerated during the 5th century until eventually it takes up nearly half the height of the entire jar. Strange fanciful additions are then made in the way of plastic ornament. To the ordinary ring handles are added a third and even a fourth, of increasingly fantastic kind. They may take the shape of an animal's face, most like a cat or an owl, or be formed like a thumbless human hand, which had probably some talismanic value. The fourth principal shape of pot is that which is known in Greece as an askos (cf. example 2), derived originally from an ordinary goatskin, and know at an early date over much of Sicily and Italy, but perhaps introduced by the Greeks.

Rarer, but extremely characteristic of the Daunians, are elaborate grotesque ritual vases. One example is a ritual vase with a female figure opposite to the spout, in ceremonial dress with a fillet on her brow, long plaits of hair hanging down on her shoulders, and circular discs covering her ears. Instead of human figures, other examples have strange creatures with birds'-heads upon necks like serpents and other unusual experiments in zoomorphism (cf. also example 3, of an unpainted Daunian vessel). Apart from an occasional drawing of this kind, always quite schematic, the decoration of all Daunian vases is purely geometric. Squares, lozenges and triangles are the usual motives, arranged in panels of varying length and separated by vertical lines. Most of the decoration is placed on the upper half of the vase. In the school of Ruvo the fashion was to place a hanging trapezoidal figure on the lower half, but Canosa preferred horizontal bands or concentric circles on this otherwise empty field. Almost all the Daunian pottery was made by hand, but in a few of the finest kraters from Ruvo the wheel seems to have been used. The decorative designs were painted in two alternating colours, red and dark violet, generally but not always laid on a background of whitish slip.

==== Peucetian ====
Entirely different from the Daunian pottery, both in spirit and in choice of shape and subject, is the Peucetian pottery. Fantastic ritual vases are unknown in Peucetia; kraters, bowls and jugs are the only forms permitted, and these are decorated in a style which is both simple and harmonious. There are two main classes of peucetian ware, the one painted in red and black (...), contemporary with imported Corinthian vases and considerably influenced by them, the other in plain black and white with a more restricted range of motives (cf. Gallery). There are four principal motives in the black and white, two of which, the swastika and the comb, overshadow the others. Swastikas began to appear at just the same period on pottery in the north of Italy, and are probably an imported conception from the Danube to the Balkans. The other chief motives are the festoon, and the zigzag. Cross-hatched lozenges are common to all these geometric schools but the Maltese cross, though only occasional, is peculiar to the Peucetians. This black and white ware goes back to 650BC and has a range of about 150 years from that point downwards.

The sources of inspiration for the black and white class have been unsuccessfully sought in various places; and it seems fair to regard this ware as in the main an indigenous product. Daunians and Peucetians, dissimilar enough in all other respects, had each inherited a certain repertoire of geometric tradition which was widely current over the Mediterranean, but each converted it into a new style which expressed the particular temperament of an inventive and artistic race. With the red and black ware, the permeating Corinthian influence is readily identified, and vases of this kind have been found actually associated in the same graves with Corinthian. Here also credit must be given to the Peucetians potters for their ability in adopting new motives and transmuting them without slavish copying.

==== Messapian ====
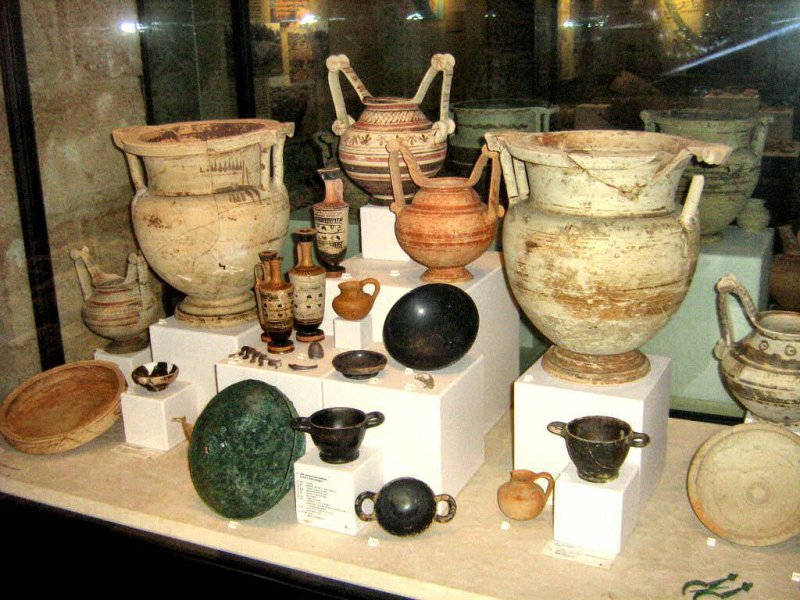
Example 4 – Messapian ware

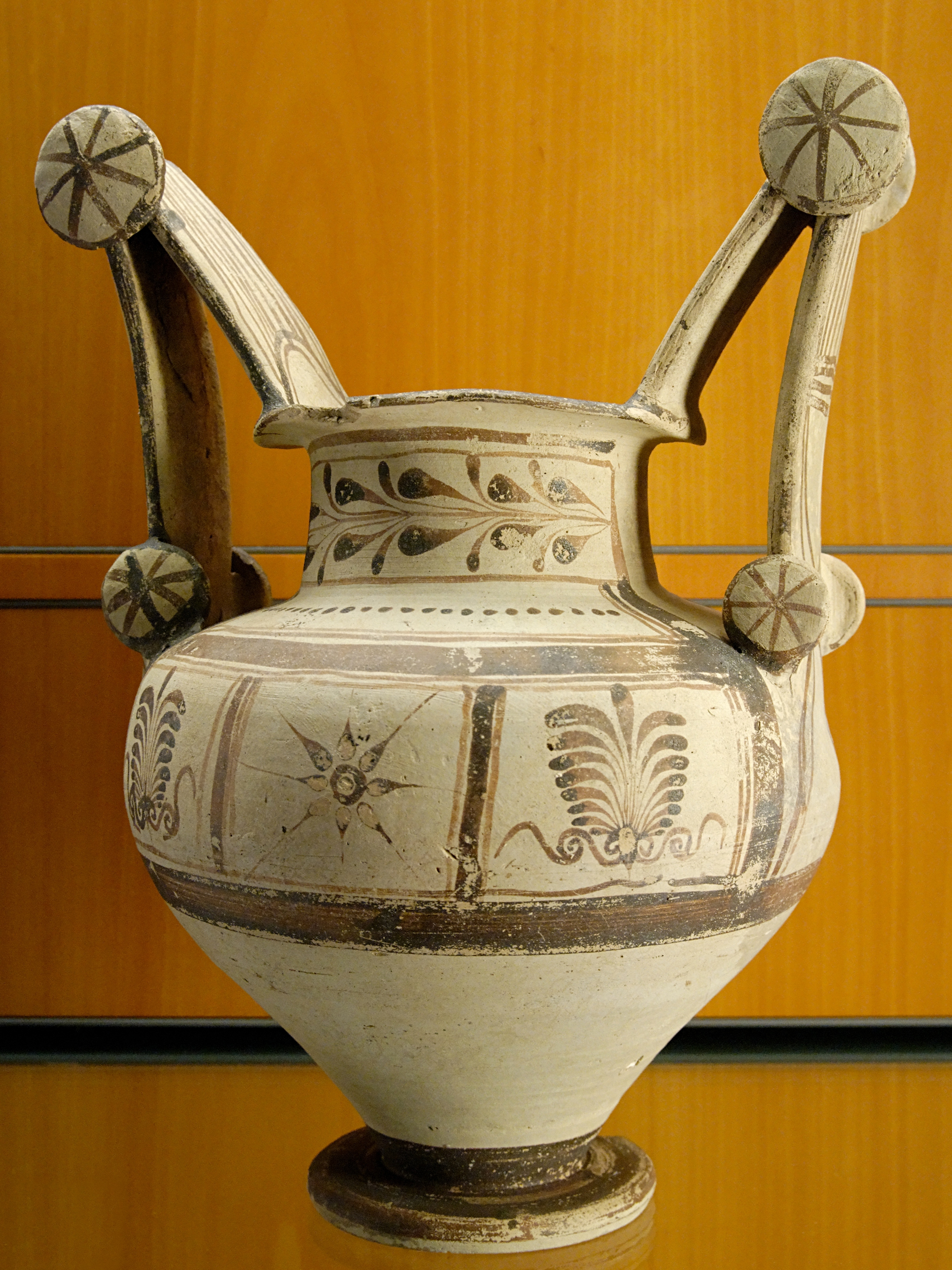
Example 5 – Trozzella, 4th century BC

The Messapian school shows far less originality than the other two. When it appears for the first time in the 5th century, the Messapian is already a mixed style, to a great extent Hellenised. Some traces of an earlier geometric tradition still survive, though overlaid and almost stifled by the foreign innovations. In the early 5th century clepsydra, lozenge and band, the old elements of the Italian geometric, are still in existence. But the uncontaminated geometric is very rare in Messapia; the native potter can hardly resist adding his zone of Greek ivy-leaves, a maeander, a rosette, or even a bird. The chief centres of manufacture for such ware (cf. example 4) were at Rugge (Rudiae), near Lecce, and Egnatia, each originally a Rhodian colony. The strongest Greek influence came therefore from Rhodian sources, though others may have had some share. The hallmark by which all Messapian pottery, except a little of the very earliest, can be detected, is the round disc about the size of a large coin at the stop and bottom of each handle. This peculiarity has caused the nickname of "trozzella" to be given to such forms (cf. example 5 and Gallery). Besides these the only shapes generally employed are the krater with column or handles, the jug, and a simple kind of bowl.

==== Canosan ====
Carefully to be distinguished from these three schools is the late-Canosan, which has nothing in common with the earlier Daunian school that also flourished at Canosa, except the shape of the vase (see Gallery). This survived simply because it was used for certain rituals which had not changed, but all the details of its decoration are different. The date of all the late-Canosan pottery is 3rd and 4th century. The evidence of the tombs shows that Canosa became the centre of a brilliant Apulian renaissance in the 4th century, and during the third it was an important factor in the art history of the Hellenistic world, becoming especially famous for large rococo works in polychrome terracotta, huge vases with centaurs and Cupids springing from the sides, surmounted very often by a Niobe, a Hermes, or some other statuette. At Naples there is a large collection of these, and of magnificent vases painted with scenes from Greek mythology and history. Documentary evidence proves that this collection, including the famous Darius vase and all the splendid examples from Canosa now at Munich, came from the same tombs as the humbler askoi twin-situlae and "sphagia" (see Gallery). If the decoration of these is examined, it will be seen that the whole spirit of the late Canosan is entirely changed from that of the earlier Daunian school. In place of the lozenge, band and triangle, the primitive motives of the geometric repertoire, there are meanders, frets, vine leaves and egg patterns, all designs appearing on the contemporary Greek pottery. The domination of Greek fashion is complete. But the irrepressible individuality of the Daunian breaks out in the large statuettes.

=== Gallery ===
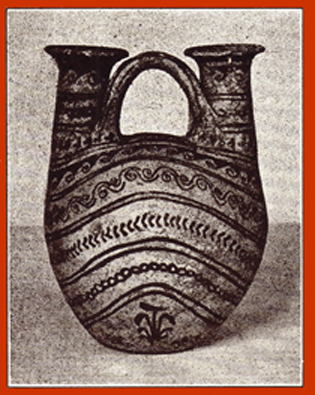
Apulian Askos

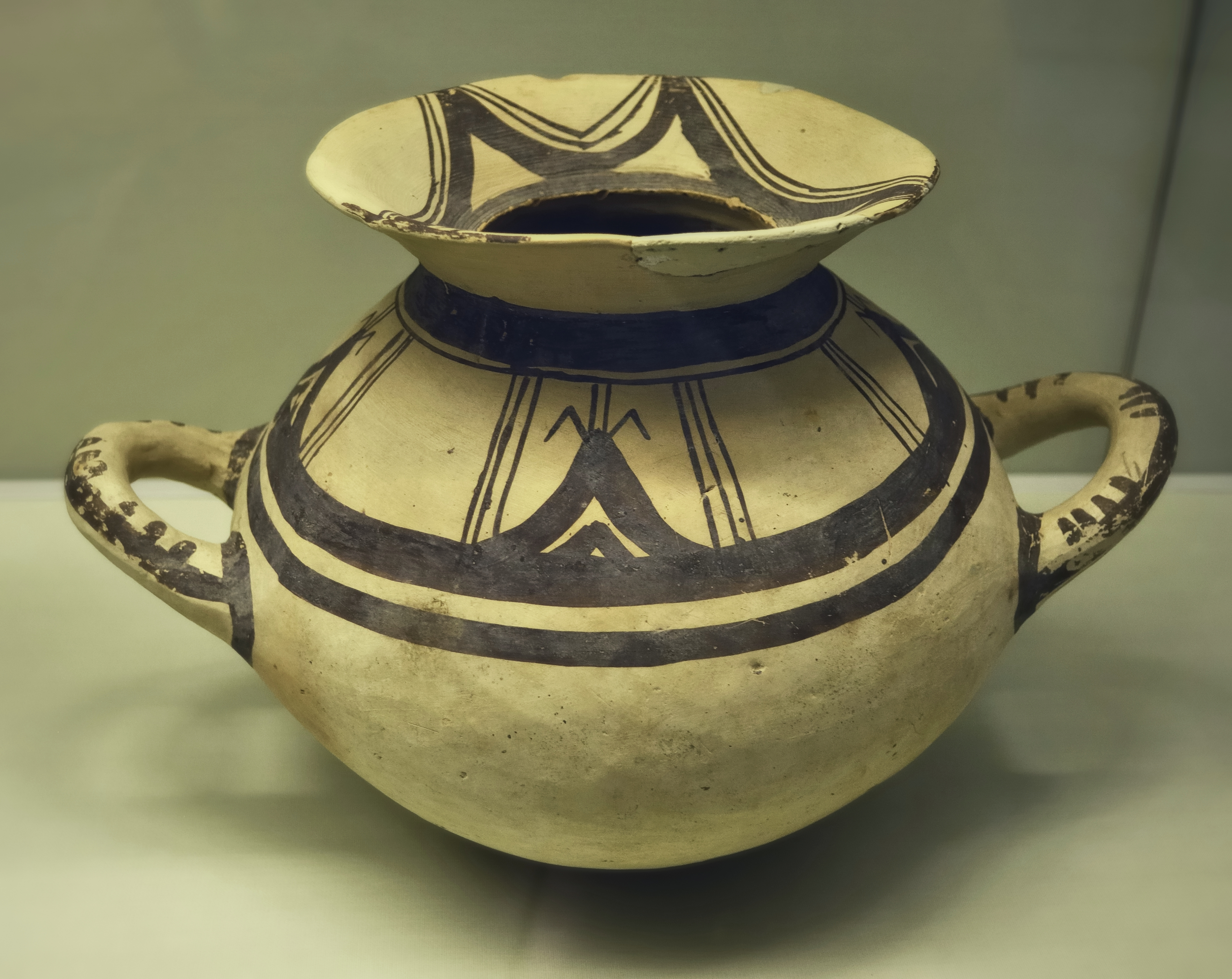
Daunian subgeometric duble-handle pot

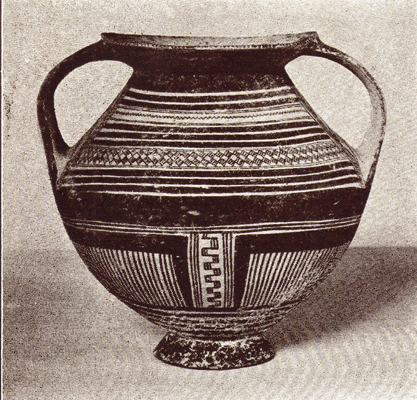
Peucetian Krater

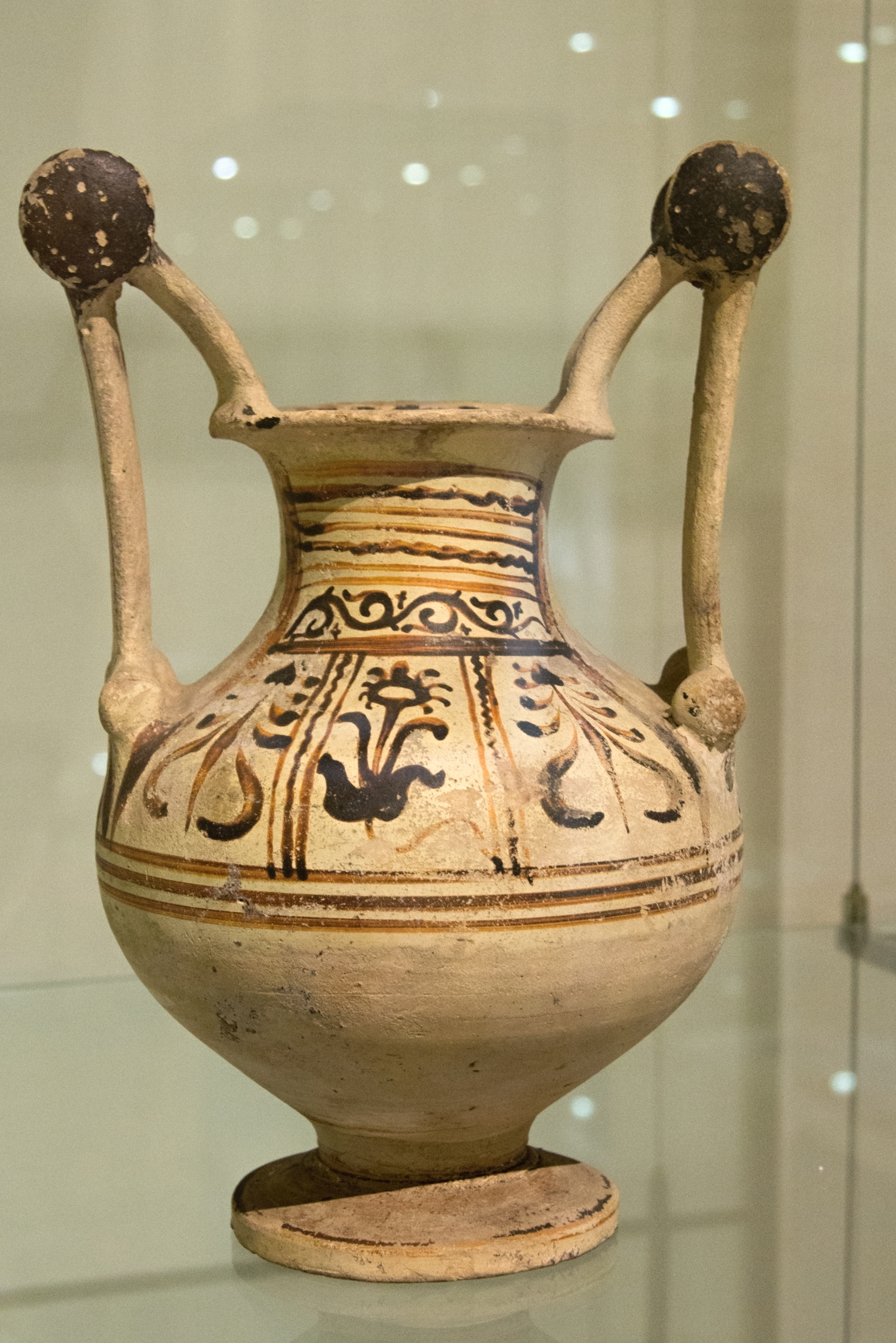
Messapian Trozella

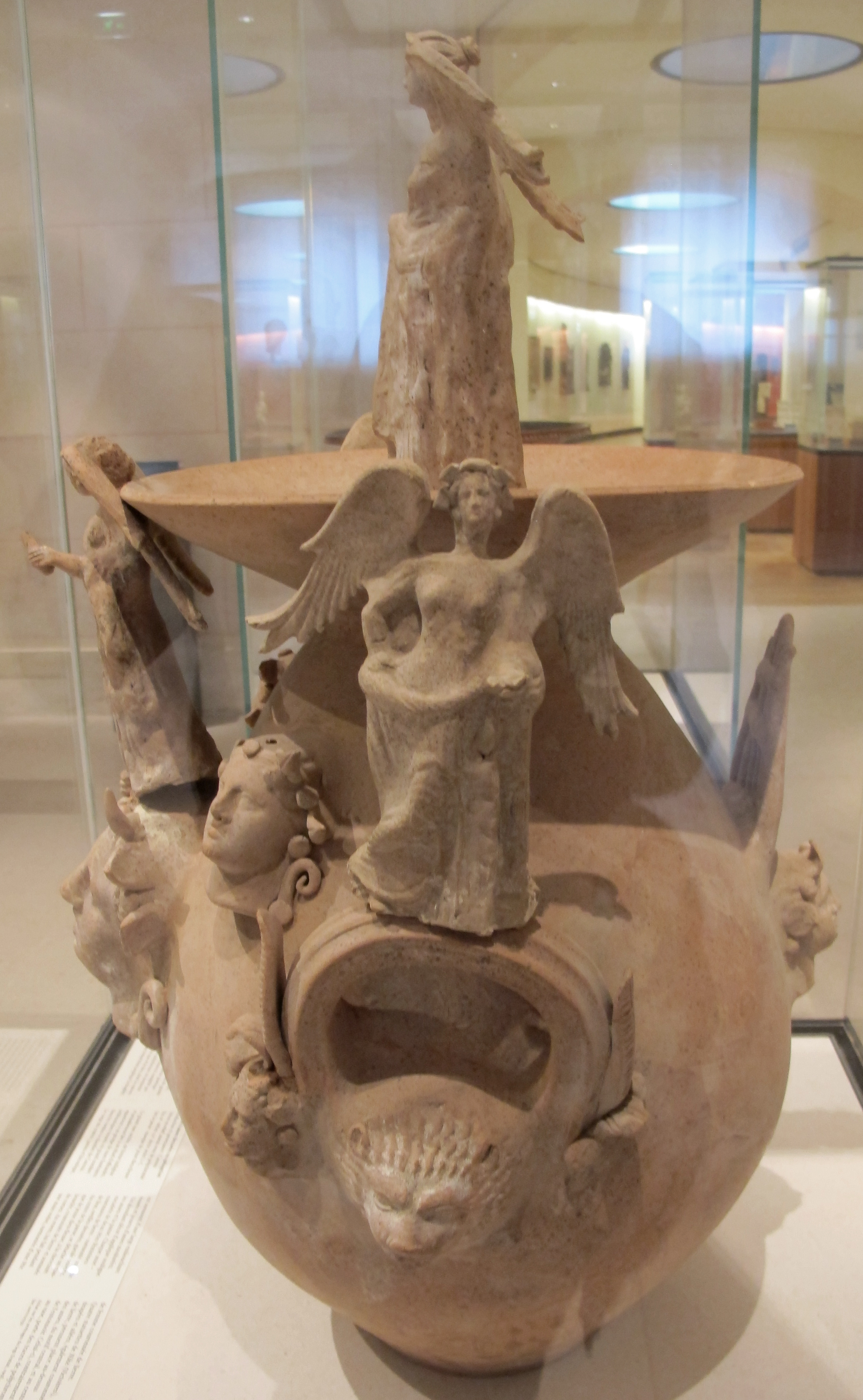
Canosan Krater

== Red-figure pottery ==
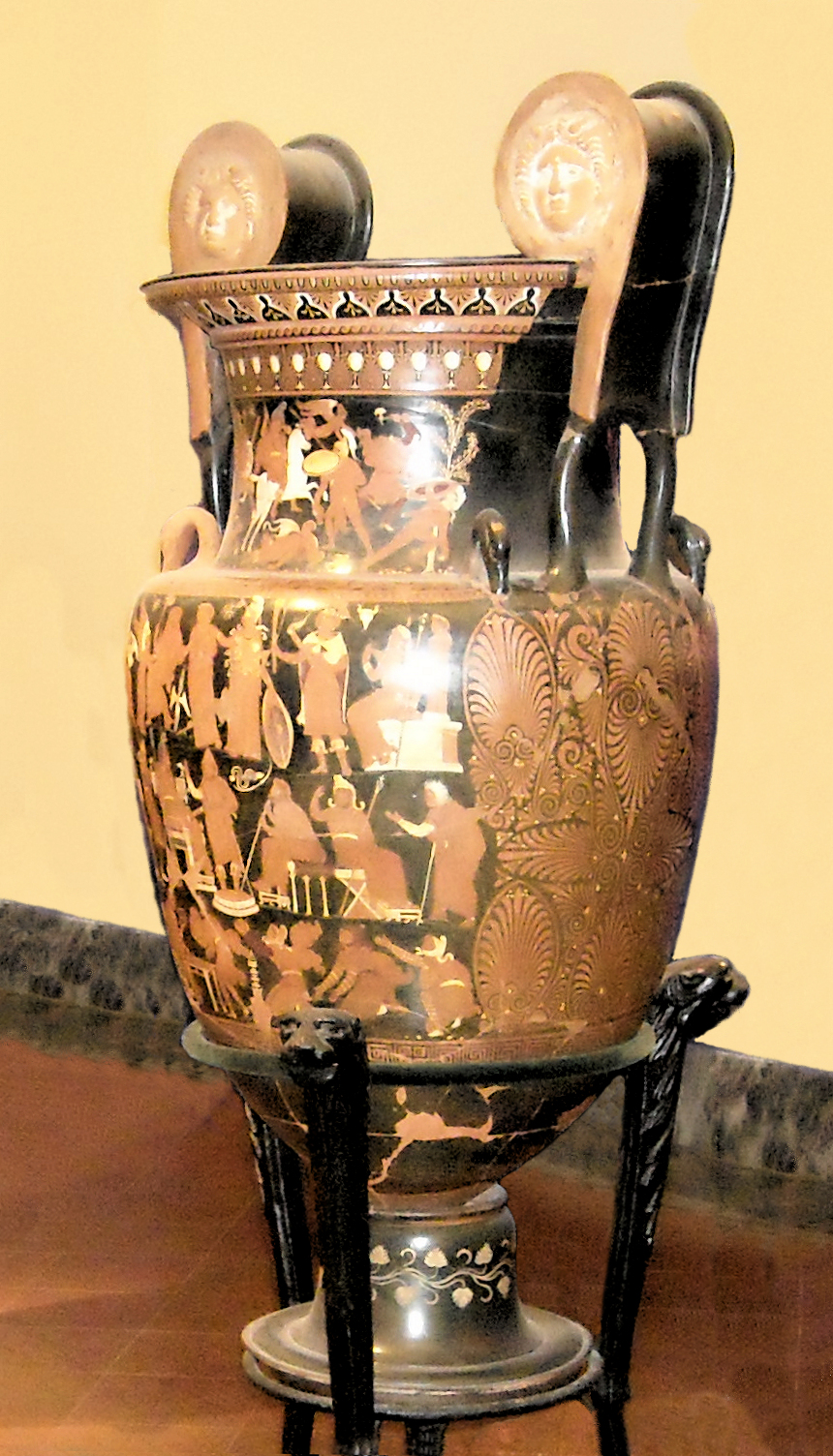
The Darius Vase (circa 340-320 BC), Naples Archaeological Museum

Apulian vase painting was the leading South Italian vase painting tradition between 430 and 300 BC. Of the circa 20,000 surviving specimens of Italian red-figure vases, about half are from Apulian production, while the rest are from the four other centres of production, Paestum, Campania, Lucania and Sicily.

The main production centre for Apulian vases was at Taras, the only large Greek polis in Messapia. Two styles, the "Plain Style" and the "Ornate Style" (sometimes "Rich Style") are distinguished. The first largely eschews additional colouring and was mostly used for the decoration of bell kraters, colonet kraters and smaller vessels. Their decoration is quite simple, the pictorial compositions usually include one to four figures (e.g., works by Sisyphus Painter, Tarporley Painter). The motifs focus on mythical subjects, but also include women's heads, warriors in scenes of battle or departure, and dionysiac thiasos imagery. The backs usually have images of cloaked youths. After the middle of the fourth century, the simple style became increasingly similar to the ornate one (see, e.g., the Varrese Painter).

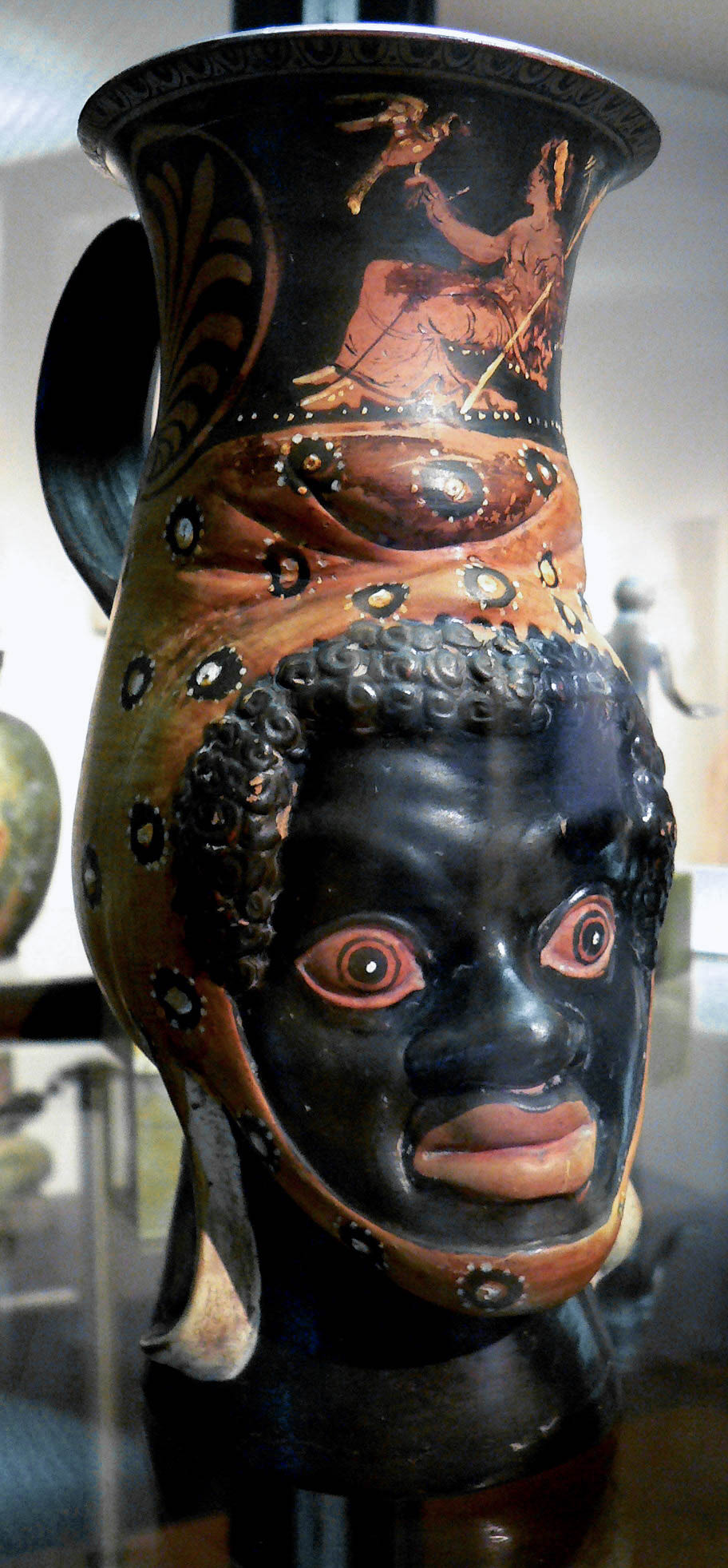
Rhyton in the shape of an African's head, circa 320 BC. Paris, Bibliothèque Nationale, Cabinet des Médailles.

The artists of the Ornate Style preferred bigger vessels with space for larger images, such as volute kraters, amphorae, loutrophoroi and hydriai. Compositions contained up to 20 figures, often arranged in two or more registers. The figures frequently appear to be floating. Colouring was used copiously, especially red, gold/yellow and white. While ornamentation had originally been relatively simple, from the mid-fourth century BC onwards, painters increasingly placed rich vegetal ornaments, especially on the necks and sides of vases. At the same time, simple perspective depictions of architecture, especially of "Underworld Palaces" (naiskoi) became common. From about 360 BC, a common motif was grave scenes showing individuals performing offerings at a stylised grave or pillar. Important representatives painters include the Ilioupersis Painter, the Darius Painter and the Baltimore Painter.

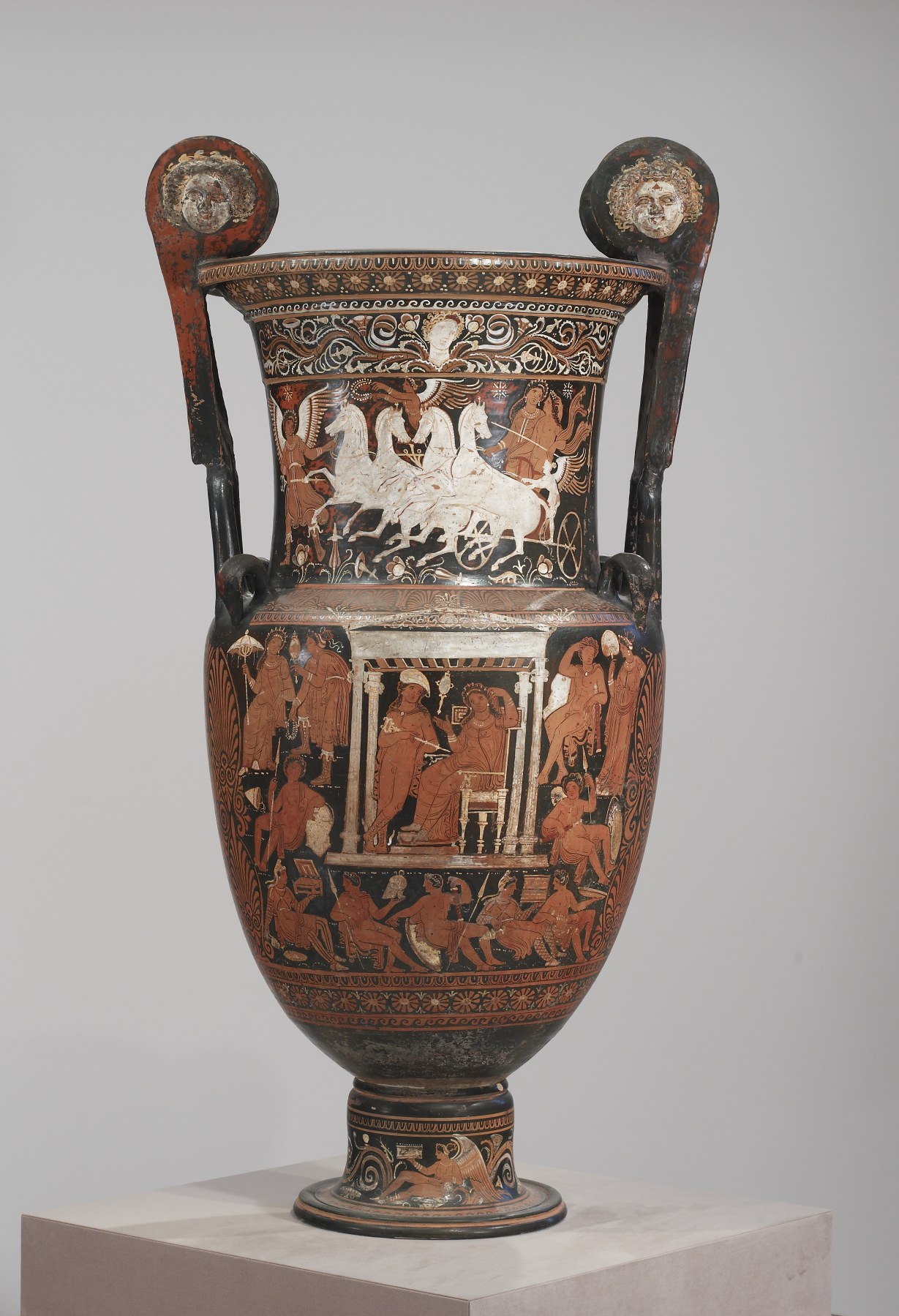
This is the piece for which the famed Baltimore Painter was named. The vessel functioned as a funerary marker and Hermes is shown waiting to guide the deceased to the underworld. Walters Art Museum, Baltimore.

Popular mythological motifs include the Assembly of the Gods, the amazonomachy, Bellerophon, Heracles, and events of the Trojan War. There are also many individual depictions of myths that are not commonly depicted elsewhere. Many scenes have dionysiac or aphrodisiac themes, probably directly connected to funerary traditions and grave cults (many of the vases were made as grave offerings). Ideas of an afterlife are frequently implied or expressed by such paintings. The motif of women's heads growing out of flowers or between tendrils belongs to the same context. Sometimes, the women's heads are replaced by that of Pan, Hermes or foreigners. In the second half of the fourth century, depictions of weddings, women and erotic motifs become more common. Apulian vases also occasionally depict theatrical scenes, which are also known from the other South Italian traditions, but absent in Attica. These include motifs from dramatic theatre as well as farce (phlyax play). In contrast, scenes of everyday life and athletic motifs disappear from the repertoire nearly totally after 370 BC.

The Apulian vase painters had considerable influence on the painters of the other South Italian traditions. Some of them appear to have moved to cities other than Taras, such as Canosa. Apart from red-figure pottery, black-glazed vases with painted decoration (Gnathian vases) and polychrome vases (Canosan vases) were also produced. The South Italian clays are less rich in iron than the Attic ones. As a result, the clay would not reach the rich red known from Attic red-figure vases. This was compensated by the addition of slips of light ochre clay before firing, which also produced smoother surfaces.

== See also ==
- Apulian picture vases for a funeral ceremony (Berlin Antique Collection)

== Literature ==
- Maximilian Mayer, Apulien vor und während der Hellenisierung, 1914
- Michele Gervasio, I dolmen e la civiltà del bronzo nelle Puglie, Bari, 1913
- Michele Gervasio, Bronzi arcaici e ceramica geometrica nel Museo di Bari, 1921
- Arthur Dale Trendall, The red-figured vases of Apulia, 1. Early and Middle Apulian, Oxford 1978
- Arthur Dale Trendall, The red-figured vases of Apulia, 2. Late Apulian. Indexes, Oxford 1982
- Arthur Dale Trendall & Alexander Cambitoglou, First supplement to the red-figured vases of Apulia, University of London, Institute of Classical Studies, Bulletin supplements 42, London 1983
- Arthur Dale Trendall & Alexander Cambitoglou, Second supplement to the red-figured vases of Apulia, 1-3, University of London, Institute of Classical Studies, Bulletin supplements 60, London 1991-92
- Arthur Dale Trendall, Rotfigurige Vasen aus Unteritalien und Sizilien. Ein Handbuch. von Zabern, Mainz 1991 (Kulturgeschichte der Antiken Welt Vol. 47), ISBN 3-8053-1111-7 (esp. p. 85-177)
- D. Randall-MacIver, The Iron Age in Italy, Clarendon Press, 1927.
- Rolf Hurschmann, Apulische Vasen, in Der Neue Pauly Vol. 1 (1996), col. 922-923.
- Von Bothmer, Dietrich (1987). Greek vase painting. New York: The Metropolitan Museum of Art. ISBN 0870990845.
