= Baltimore Painter =

Ancient Greek vase painter

Name vase of the Baltimore Painter (320–310 BC)
(Walters Art Museum)

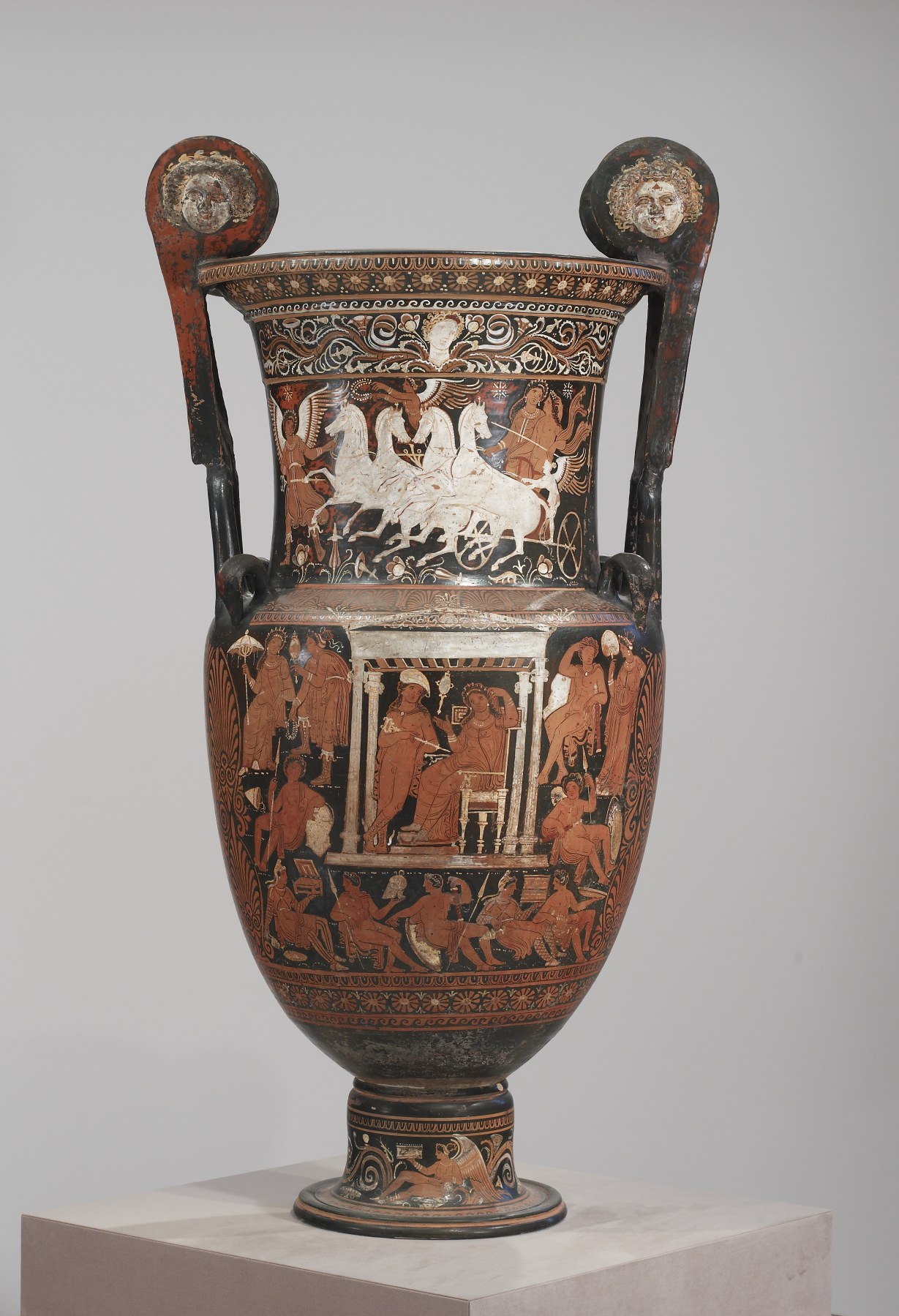
Hermes waits to guide a deceased woman to the afterlife

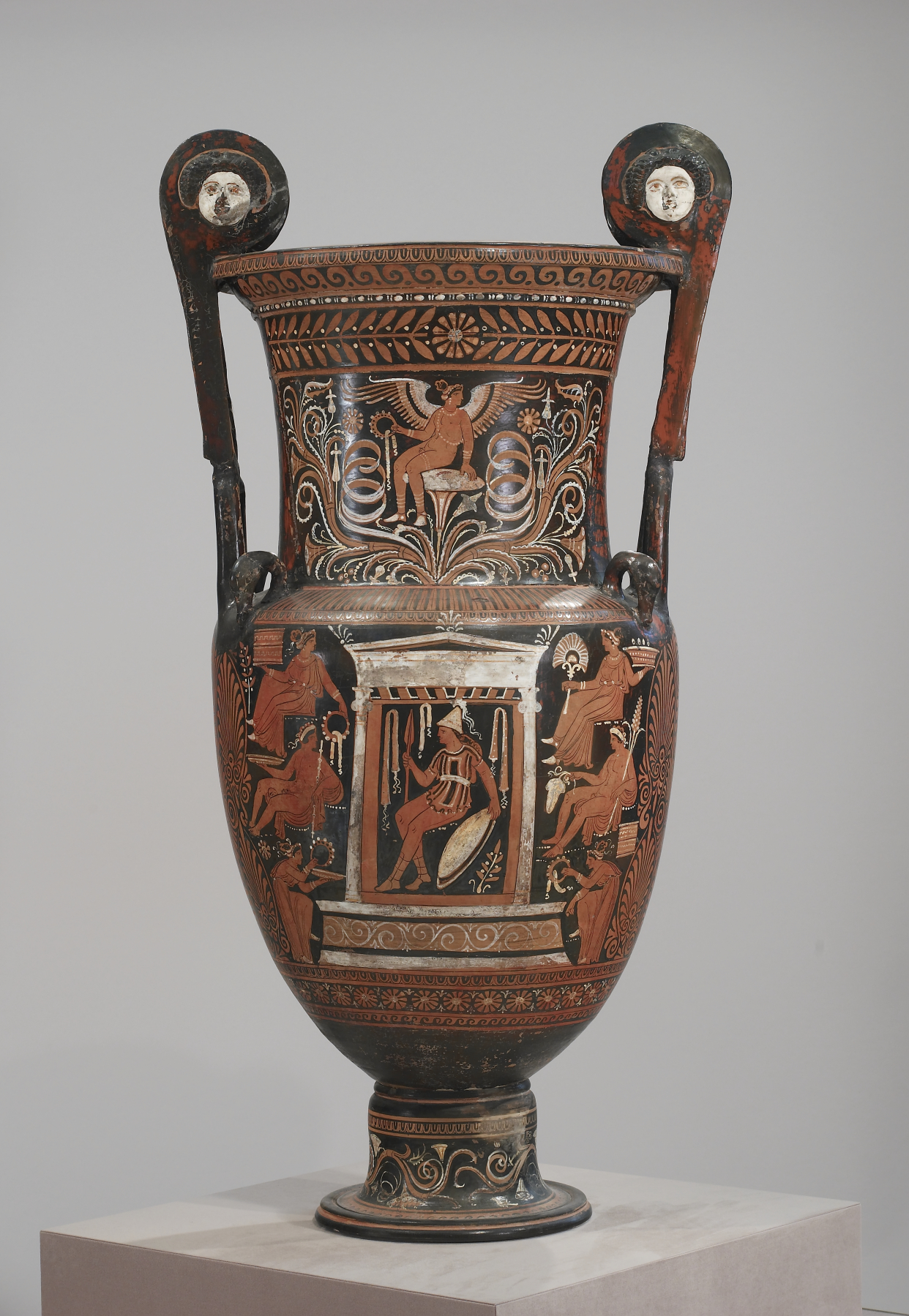
Warrior in Campanian clothing seated in a naiskos

The Baltimore Painter was an Apulian vase painter whose works date to the final quarter of the 4th century BC. He is considered the most important Late Apulian vase painter, and the last Apulian painter of importance. His conventional name is derived from a vase kept at the Walters Art Museum in Baltimore.

The Baltimore Painter's early work was strongly influenced by the Patera Painter. He mainly painted large format volute kraters, amphorae, loutrophoroi and hydriai. It is likely that his workshop was at Canosa.

He depicted sepulchral scenes (naiskos vases), usually depicting a naiskos on the front and a grave stele on the back, often characterised by figures in yellow-orange garments), mythological and dionysiac scenes, as well as erotes, weddings and scenes from the life of women.

Stylistically, especially in regard to vase shapes and pictorial themes, his work is very similar to that of the Underworld Painter. The Baltimore Painter's work is characterised by rich and fine detail, especially in ornamentation. Several painters were closely associated with him, including the Stoke-on-Trent Painter, who was either a very close colleague or may in fact be identical with him, and the painters of the T.C.-Group. His successors include the probable heir of his workshop, the White-Sakkos Painter, other painters of the White-Sakkos Group, the Sansone Painter, the Stuttgart Group and the Kantharos Group.

== Bibliography ==
- Hurschmann, Rolf (2006). "Baltimore Painter". Brill's New Pauly.
- Arthur Dale Trendall. Rotfigurige Vasen aus Unteritalien und Sizilien. Ein Handbuch. Philipp von Zabern, Mainz, 1991 (Kulturgeschichte der Antiken Welt Bd. 47), esp. p. 115-118 ISBN 3-8053-1111-7.
