= Tarporley Painter =

Ancient Greek red-figure vase painter

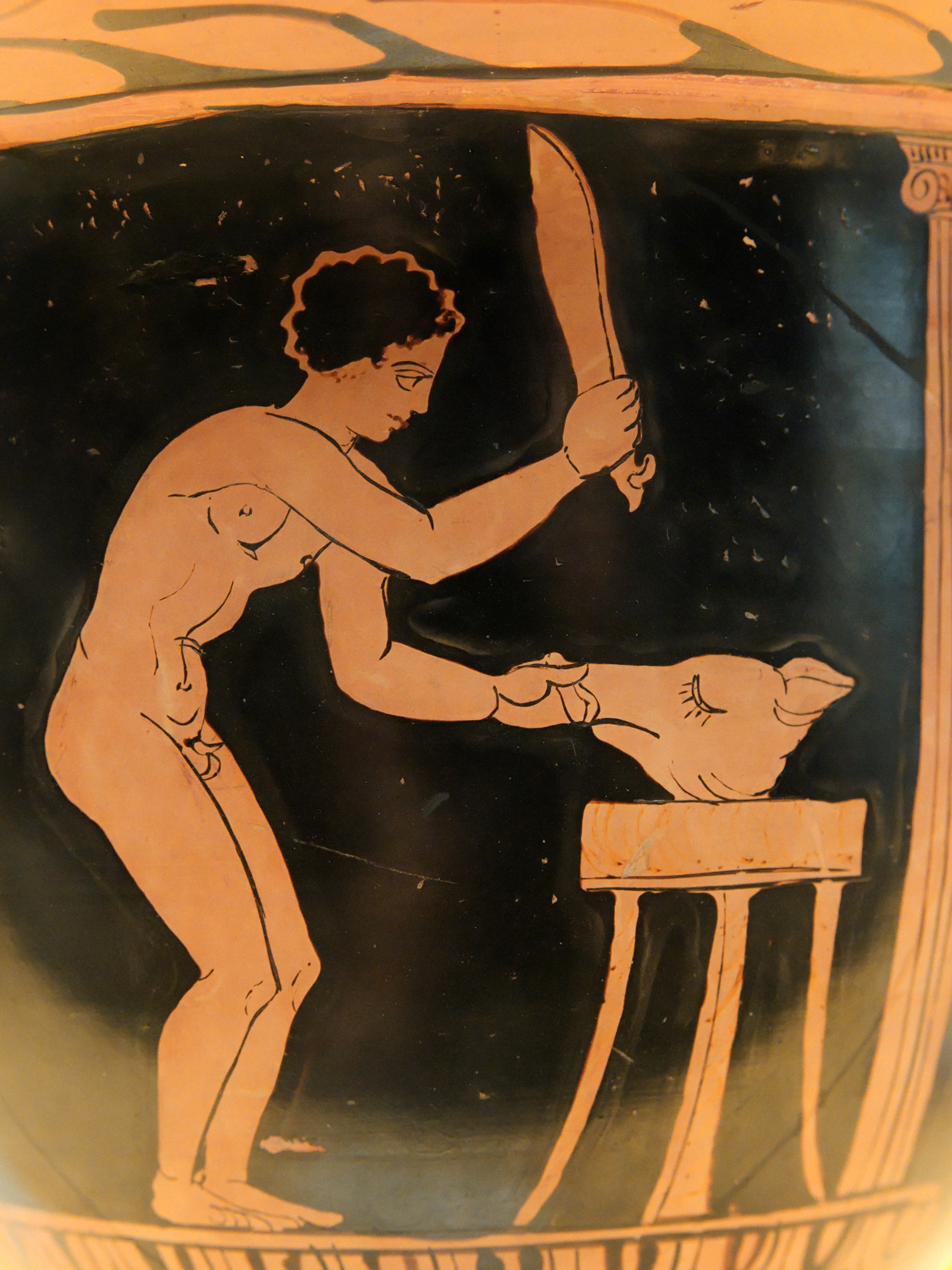
Youth preparing a pig's head after the sacrifice, bell-krater by the Tarporley Painter, ca. 360–340 BC, National Archaeological Museum of Spain

The Tarporley Painter was a Greek Apulian red-figure vase painter. His works date to the first quarter of the 4th century BC. The Tarporley Painter is his period's most important representative of the so-called "Plain Style". He is considered to have been the pupil and successor of the Sisyphus Painter, as indicated by his elegant fine-limbed figures and the solemn facial expressions of his woman and cloaked youths. He painted garments in a less balanced style then the Sisyphus Painter. His heads are often oval and lean forwards. The spaces between his figures are often filled with flowers, branches or vines. Over time, his drawing style becomes more fluid, but also less precise. He painted especially on bell kraters, on which he often depicted dionysiac themes and theatrical scenes. His work includes the first known phlyax vase, showing the punishment of a thief, accompanied by a metric verse inscription. Mythological scenes by him are rare. There appears to be an especially close relationship between the work of the Tarporley Painter and that of the Dolon Painter, perhaps they cooperated directly for some time. His succession is represented by three separate schools, each clearly influenced by him. The most important painter of the first is the Schiller Painter, of the second the Hoppin Painter and of the third the Painter of Karlsruhe B9 and the Dijon Painter.

== Bibliography ==
- Arthur Dale Trendall. Rotfigurige Vasen aus Unteritalien und Sizilien. Ein Handbuch. von Zabern, Mainz 1991 (Kulturgeschichte der Antiken Welt Vold. 47), esp. p. 86-88 ISBN 3-8053-1111-7
