= Ilioupersis Painter =

Ancient Greek vase painter

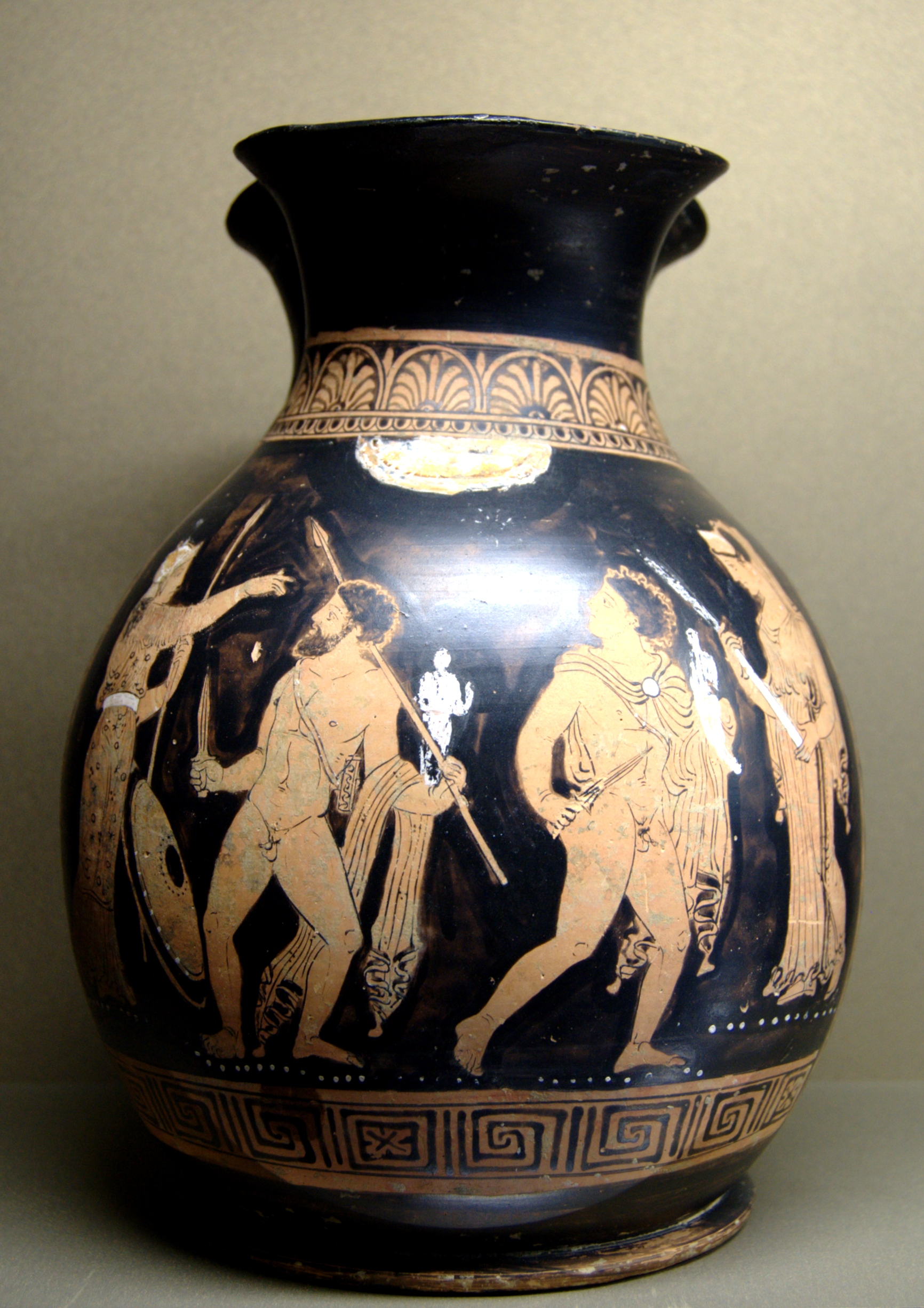
Odysseus and Diomedes stealing the Palladium from Troy, oinochoe from the Ilioupersis Painter's school, c. 360/50 BC. Paris, Louvre.

The Ilioupersis Painter (also spelled Iliupersis) was an Apulian vase painter. His works are dated to the second quarter of the 4th century BC.

The Ilioupersis Painter begins to the beginning of the middle phase of Apulian vase painting, and the start of the so-called Ornate Style. His conventional name is derived from his name vase, a volute krater in the British Museum with depictions of the iloupersis (the sack of Troy). He followed the tradition of the Dijon Painter, but was an innovative artist who introduced significant aspects to Apulian vase painting. Thus, he introduced the depictions of grave scenes (naiskos vases) into the repertoire of motifs, started the habit of rippling the lower parts of vessel surfaces, and invented the decoration of the handles of volute kraters with circular medaillons depicting faces. The motif of a female head rising between tendrils from a flower was also first painted by him. His motifs include mythological and dionysiac scenes, as well as genre scenes with erotes, men and women. His most important vessel shape is the volute krater, which became the dominant shape in Apulia maybe due to his influence. Nonetheless, the over 100 works attributed to him include many other shapes. He was one of the first vase painters to substantially use additional white and yellow colour. Sometimes, he also utilised red and brown. His most important collaborator and colleague at the same workshop was the Painter of Athens 1714; the many successors continuing his tradition include the Painter of the Dublin situlae.

== Bibliography ==
- Rolf Hurschmann: Iliupersismaler, in: Der Neue Pauly 5 (1998), col 938.
- Arthur Dale Trendall: Rotfigurige Vasen aus Unteritalien und Sizilien. Ein Handbuch. von Zabern, Mainz 1991 (Kulturgeschichte der Antiken Welt Vol. 47), esp. p. 91-94 ISBN 3-8053-1111-7
