= Treweek =

Treweek is a surname of British origin. It may refer to:

- Athanasius Treweek (1911–1995), Australian linguist
- Bernie Treweek (1914–1957), Australian football player
- George Treweek (1905–1991), Australian rugby league player
- Hazel Treweek (1919–2005), Australian educator
- Rachel Treweek (born 1963), British bishop
