= Traywick =

Traywick is a surname of Cornish origin. Notable people with the surname include:

- Aaron Traywick (1989-2018), American businessman and life extension activist
- Randy Traywick (born 1959), better known as Randy Travis, American country music and gospel music singer

== See also ==
- Trawick
- Trewick
- Treweek
