= Trewick =

Trewick is a surname. Notable people with the surname include:

- Alan Trewick (1941–1993), English footballer
- George Trewick (1933–2003), English footballer
- John Trewick (born 1957), English footballer and manager
- Robert Trewick Bone (1790–1840), English painter

== See also ==
- Trawick
- Traywick
