= Sisyphus Painter =

Ancient Greek vase painter

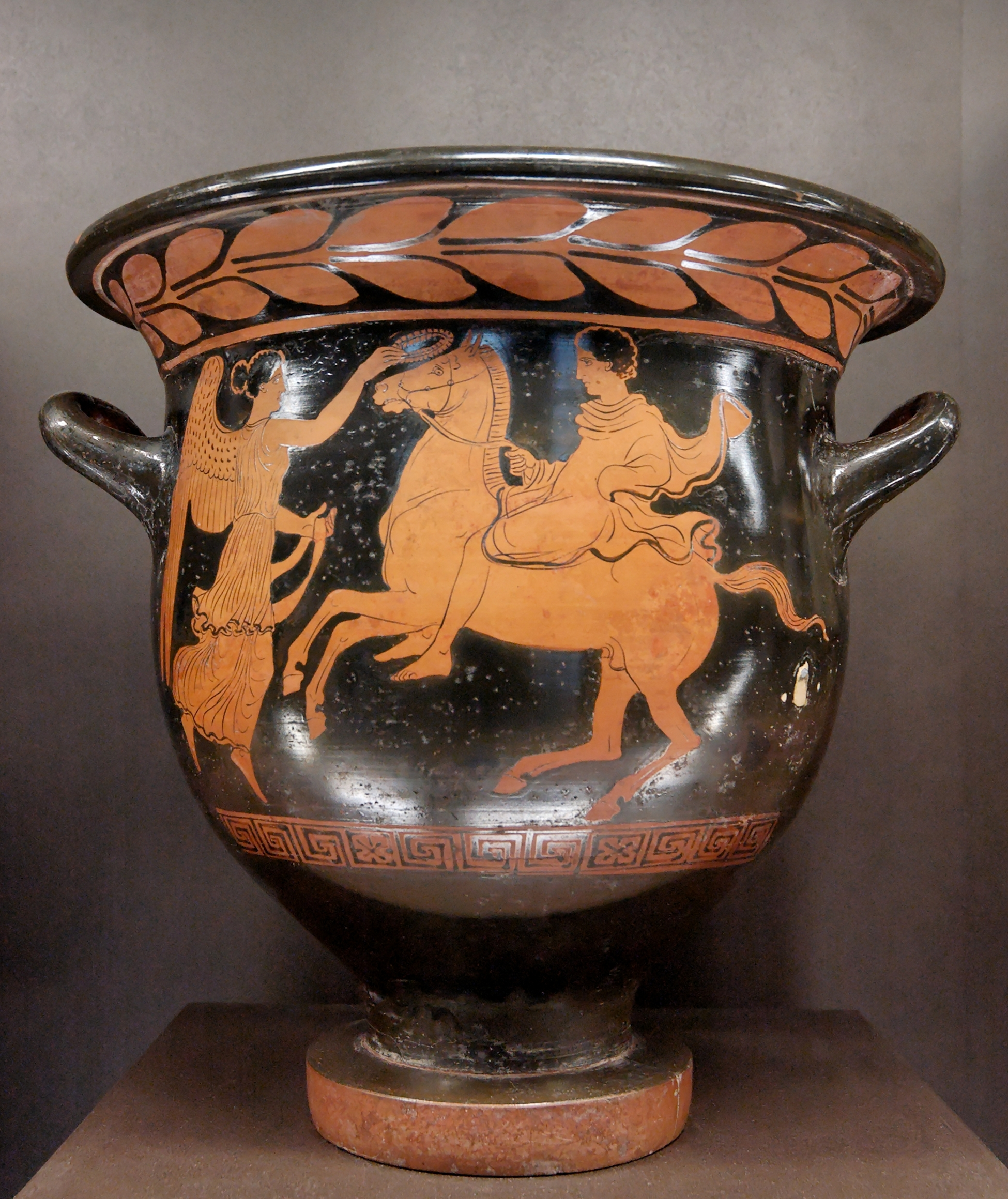
Bell krater with the depiction of a young horseman being crowned by Nike. Circa 420 BC. Paris, Louvre.

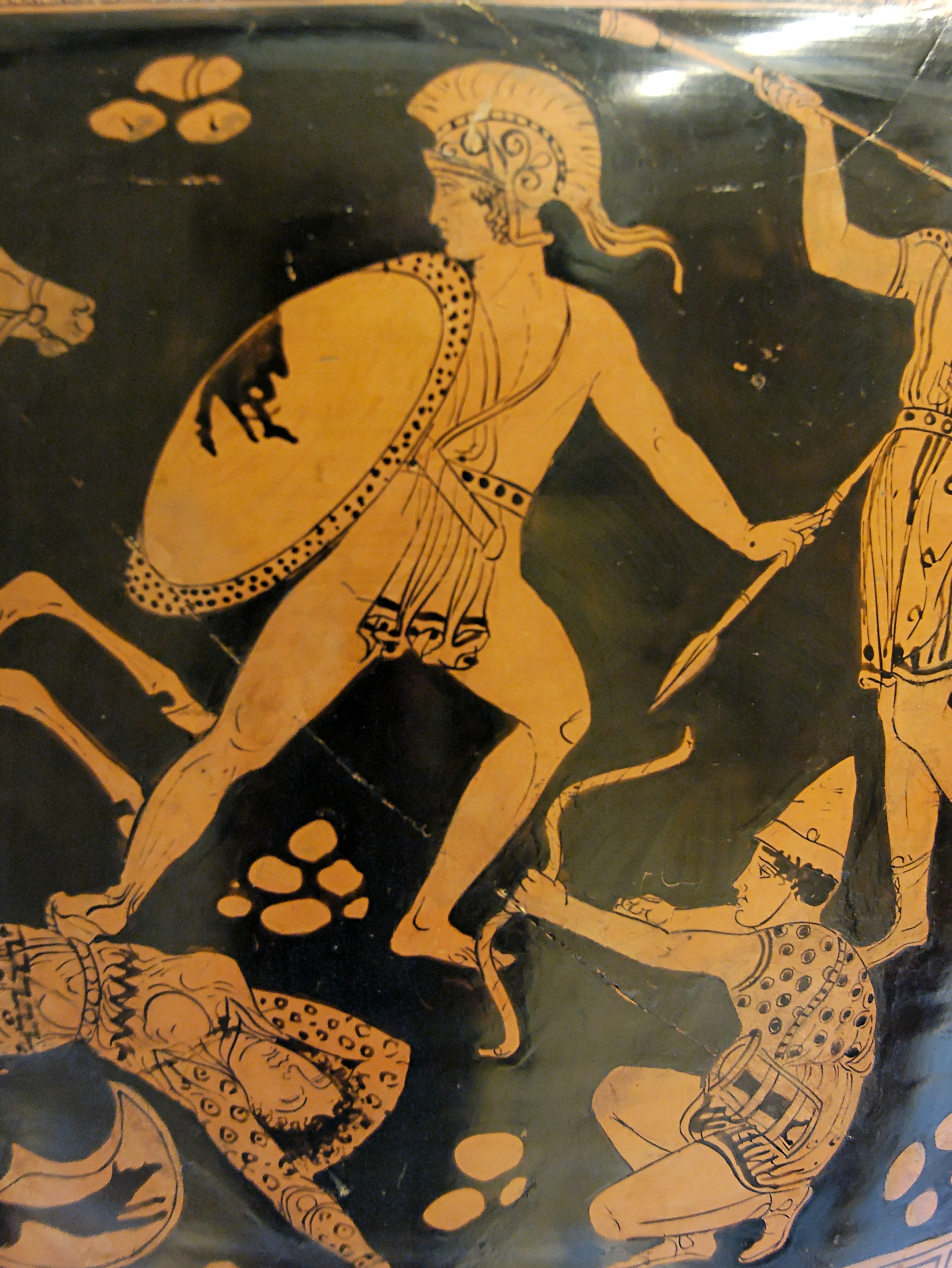
Amazonomachy on a volute krater, circa 410/400 BC. London, British Museum.

The Sisyphus Painter was an Apulian red-figure vase painter. His works are dated to the last two decades of the fifth century and the very early fourth century BC.

The Sisyphus Painter is only known by a notname, as his true name remains unknown. He is one of the most influential painters in the Apulian vase painting tradition, and thus in all South Italian vase painting. His notname name is derived from the inscription on the heart-shaped gift held by a youth as part of the depiction of a wedding on one of his volute kraters. He follows the tradition of the Painter of the Berlin Dancing Girl in whose workshop he is assumed to have started. Arthur Dale Trendall described the Sisyphus Painter as "probably the dominant artist of the Taras School". Nonetheless, the quality of his works is uneven. Especially on larger vases he showed his quality as a painter of heads, often depicted in a three-quarter profile.

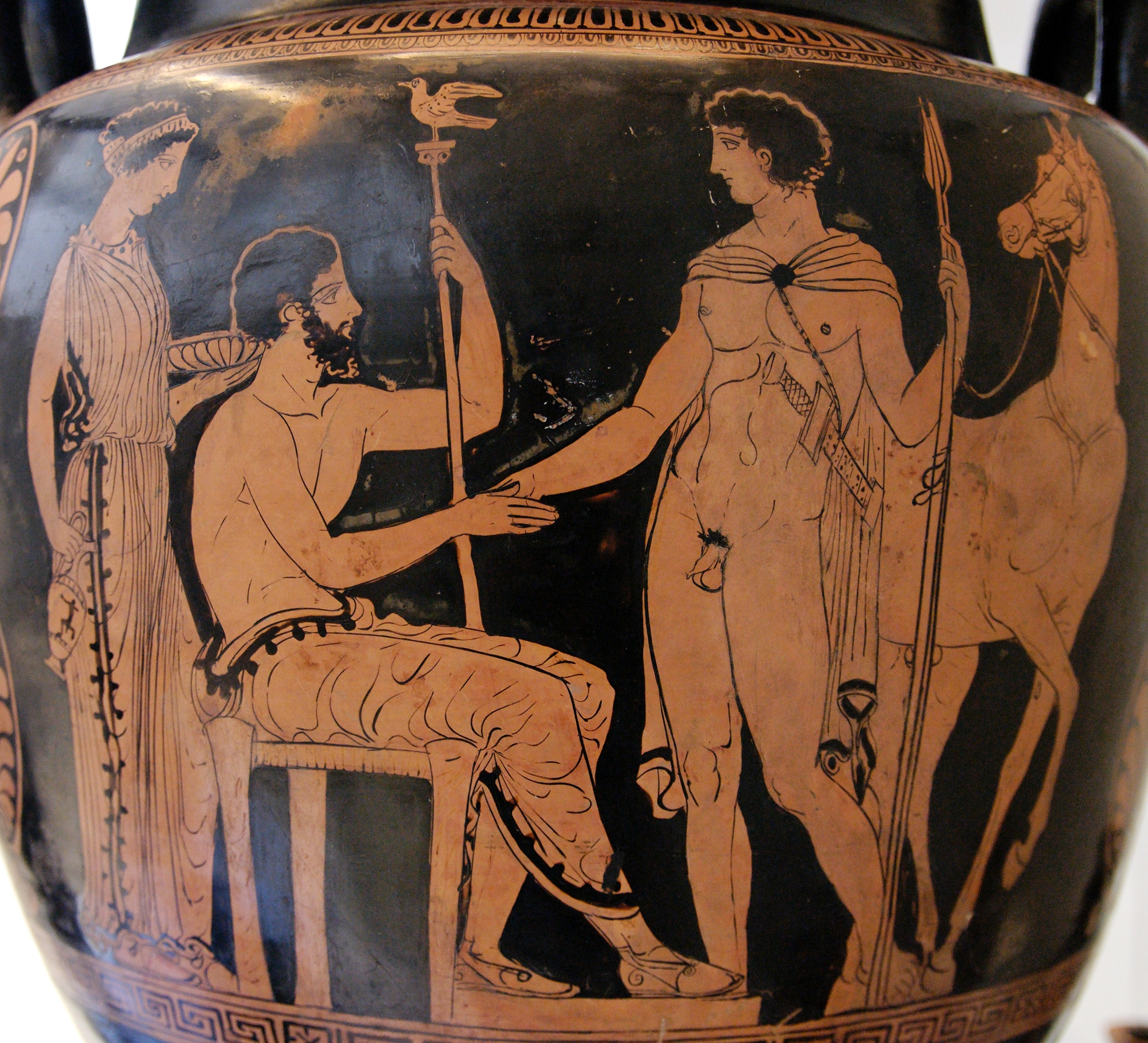
Arrival or departure of a young warrior or hero, volute krater, circa 410/400 BC. London, British Museum.

His early work includes a variety of bell kraters, usually decorated with three figures. He mainly painted scenes of everyday life or dionysiac scenes. On the backs he always painted two or three cloaked youths. Towards the later phase of his activity, the quality of his work deteriorated, many of his late paintings appear very stereotypical, the faces rounder, their features coarser. His range of subjects also turns less and less imaginative, limited almost entirely to youths, warriors and women.

It is suggested that the Sisyphus Painter was influenced by some Attic artists, namely the Dwarf Painter and the Kodros Painter. There are also some similarities between his work and that of Polion. The Sisyphus Painter stands at the starting point of both main currents of later Apulian vase painting: on the one hand the "Plain Style", with simple figural compositions on smaller vessels, on the other hand the "Ornate Style" with large vases depicting scenes connected with funerary rituals and grave cult. Some other important Apulian painters were closely connected with him, e.g. the Hearst Painter. The Tarporley Painter was his pupil and successor at his workshop.

== Bibliography ==
- Arthur Dale Trendall: Rotfigurige Vasen aus Unteritalien und Sizilien. Ein Handbuch. von Zabern, Mainz 1991 (Kulturgeschichte der Antiken Welt, Vol. 47), besonders S. 29 bis 35 ISBN 3-8053-1111-7
