= Canosa vases =

Funerary pottery of ancient Apulia

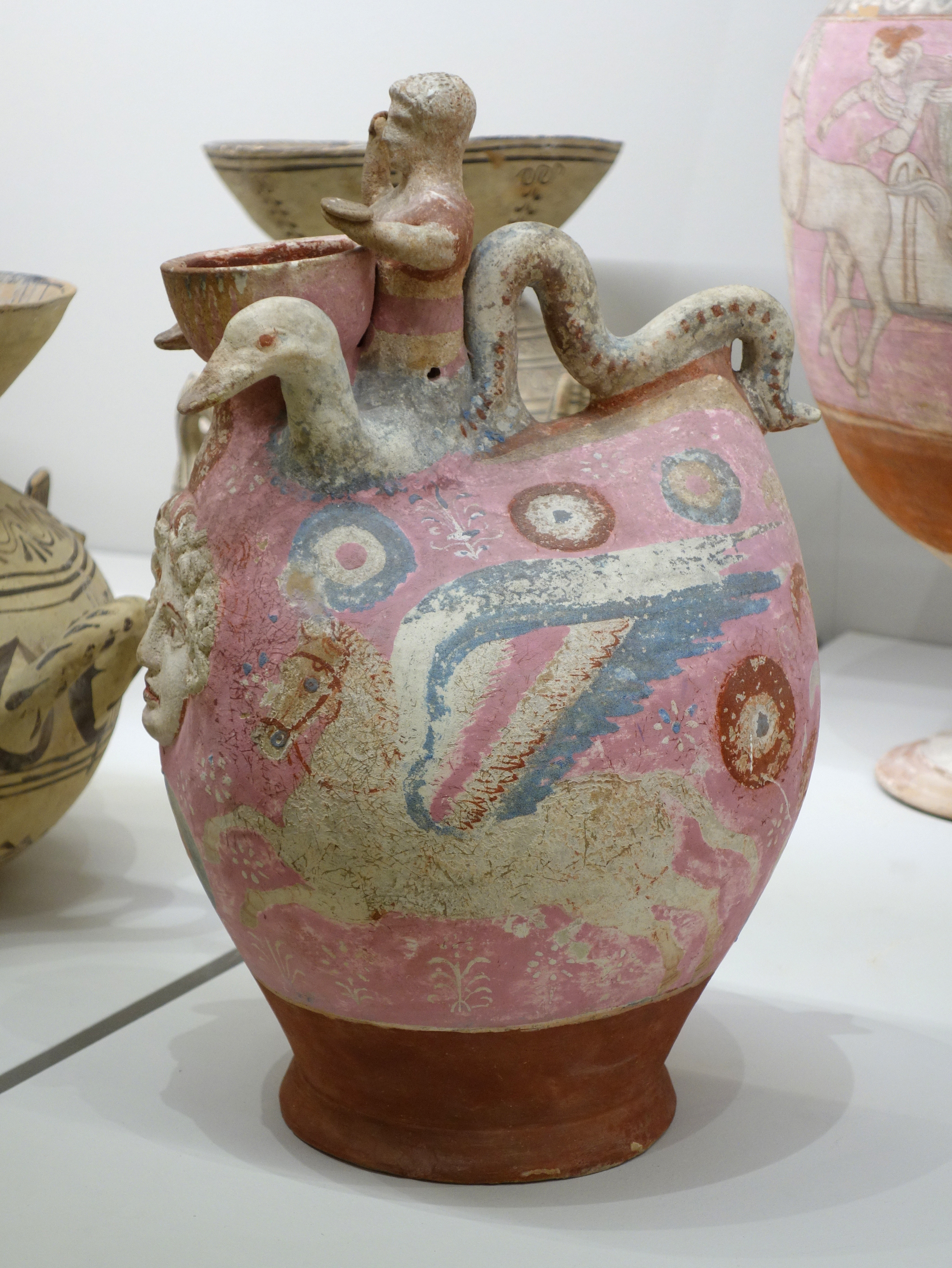
Canosan polychrome askos (Museo archeologico nazionale, Canosa)

Canosa vases, also known as “Magenta wares," are a type of funerary pottery belonging to ancient Apulian vase painting. They were produced between 350 and 300 BC and designed exclusively for funerary use.

The distinguishing feature of Canosa vases are the water-soluble paints, which are not always fired onto the body, leaving the colors susceptible to damage. The pigments most commonly used on these funerary wares are blue, black, light purple, pink, and white. The heavy use of pink on many of these ceramics is how they got the nickname Magenta Wares. These would have been added to the pottery by adding white slip onto the ware and then adding the pigments on top.

Popular shapes included volute kraters, kantharoi, oinochoai and askoi. A common motif were female figures, standing on a small pedestal. Additionally, decoration included applied plastic winged heads, gorgons and similar motifs. The paintings often depicted Nike, chariots, battle scenes, naiskoi and winged female figures. The main find locations of such vessels are Canosa (after which the vases are now named), Arpi and Ordona.

== See also ==
- Ancient Greek funerary vases

== Bibliography ==
- Rolf Hurschmann: Canosiner Vasen, in: Der Neue Pauly 2 (1997), Col. 965f.
