= Trawick =

Trawick is a surname. Notable people with the surname include:

- Brynden Trawick (born 1989), American football player
- Herb Trawick (1921–1985), American player of Canadian football
- Herb Trawick (music executive) (1956-2026), music executive
- Jack Trawick (1947–2009), American serial killer

== See also ==
- Trawick, Texas, unincorporated community in Nacogdoches County, Texas, United States
- Traywick, surname
