= Athanasius Treweek =

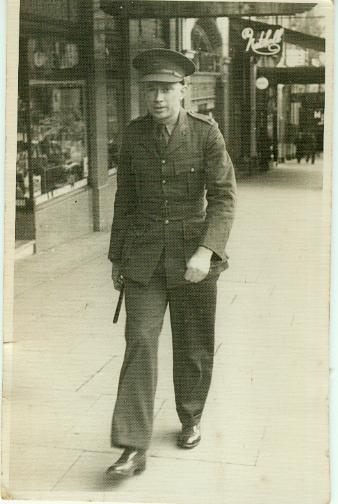
Athanasius Treweek in 1942

Lieutenant Colonel Athanasius Pryor "Ath" Treweek (1911–1995) was an Australian academic, linguist, mathematician and code-breaker. He was the son of Walter Henry Treweek (a teacher who came from Cornwall to Australia in the 1880s) and Mary Matilda Dwyer a nurse. They married in Cooma, New South Wales, Australia on 11 February 1909. She was 37 and he was 43. He was an only child and his father died in 1920 of the Spanish influenza when Ath was 8 years old. His mother could work as a nurse only by living in at a hospital, so he was sent to a boarding school in Bowral.

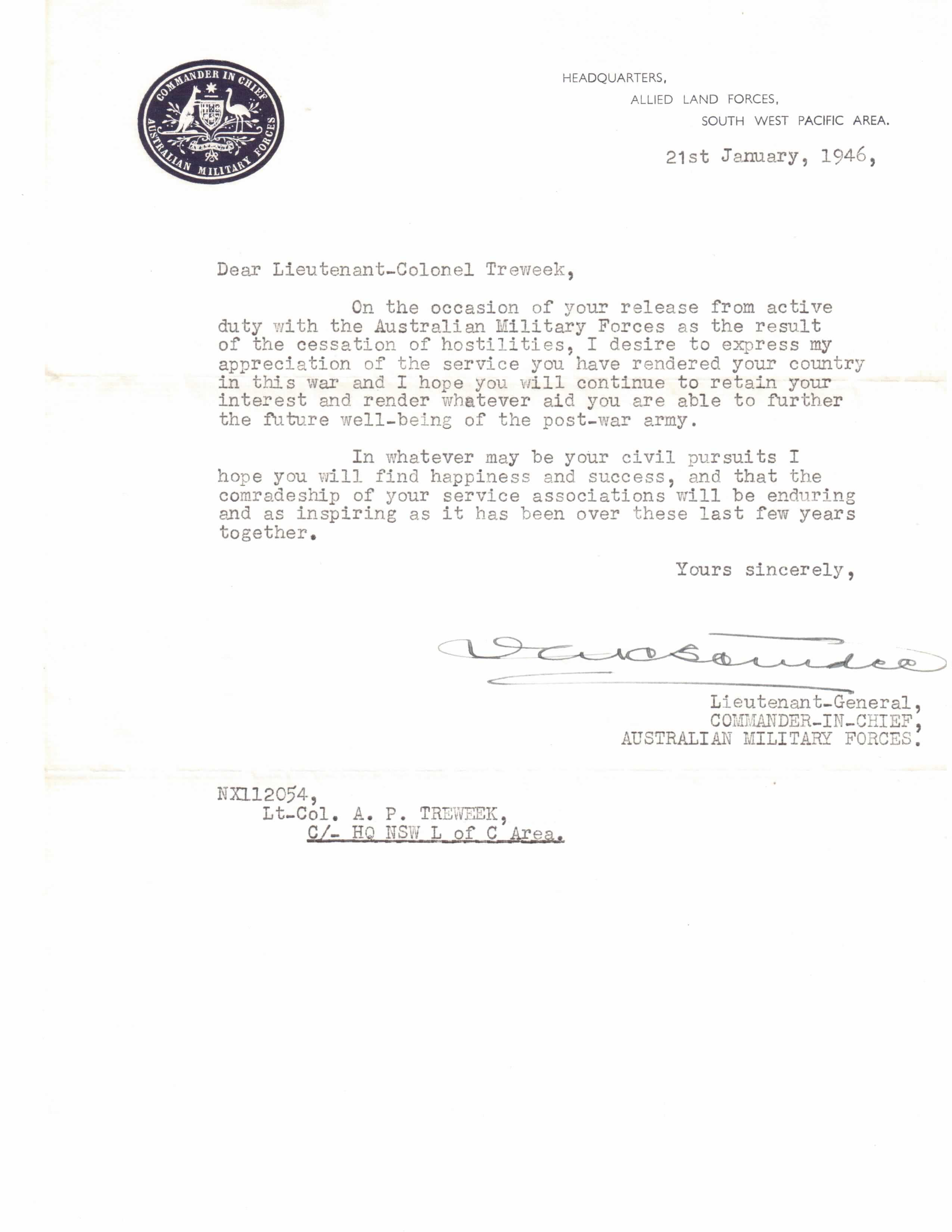
Athanasius Pryor Treweek release from active duty in 1946

After attending Saint Ignatius' College, Riverview, where he was dux in 1928, "Ath" Treweek (as he was generally known) won the 1932 Cooper Scholarship for first place in Latin and Greek examinations conducted by the University of Sydney. Ath took both a First in Latin and Greek, with the University Medal in Classics, and an Honours degree in mathematics. The combination led to a PhD thesis on fourth-century Greek geometry. He joined the Greek Department at University of Sydney in 1938, eventually going on to become a Professor of Greek at that very same institution.

In 1937, in anticipation of impending war, he had taught himself to read Japanese. He was already a major in the Citizen Military Forces commanding a field battery in the Sydney University Regiment. Following the outbreak of World War II, in January 1940, with the encouragement of the Australian Army, he, together with some colleagues at the University of Sydney, began to study Japanese codes. The others were the mathematicians Thomas Gerald Room and Richard Lyons and the classicist Arthur Dale Trendall. In May 1941 Room and Treweek attended a meeting at the Victoria Barracks in Melbourne with the Director of Naval Intelligence of the Royal Australian Navy, several Australian Army intelligence officers and Eric Nave, an expert Japanese cryptographer with the Royal Australian Navy. As a result, it was agreed that Room's group, with the agreement of the University of Sydney, would move in August 1941 to work under Nave at the Special Intelligence Bureau in Melbourne. After the outbreak of war with Japan they were working for FRUMEL (Fleet Radio Unit Melbourne), a joint American-Australian intelligence unit, but when Lieutenant Rudolph Fabian took over command of FRUMEL and particularly when, in October 1942, FRUMEL was placed under direct control of the US Navy, civilians such as the member of Room's group were found surplus to requirements and returned to their academic posts. He was part of a team instrumental in breaking Japanese naval codes. A Japanese success there would have been a major blow for the Allies. Decoded signals following the Battle of Midway confirmed that the Japanese had lost four aircraft carriers, so ending Japan's offensive capability. From then Japan's strategy was defensive; the battle was the turning point of the Pacific War.

The notebooks of his research for his PhD are online. He later published on the manuscript tradition of the ancient Greek mathematician Pappus of Alexandria, establishing that all later manuscripts were descendants of a single still-extant 10th century original, Vat. gr. 218. Emeritus Professor Bill Ritchie wrote "Apart from his particular interest in Greek mathematics, Ath's interests were especially in the language, of which he had a particularly fine knowledge. He was a very effective teacher at all levels, and especially for those whose bent was towards philological studies. He will be remembered with respect and affection by a generation of classicists."

== Family ==
Athanasius Treweek's wife, Hazel Elizabeth Logue (1919–2005) OAM, MBE, was an academic and teacher. She held a BA(Hons) and a MA from Sydney University and also trained as a teacher at Sydney Teachers College. She was the first of her family to go to university. She left school at 14 but studied at night for her Leaving Certificate. Then did her BA(Hons) as an evening student. They married in 1942 and had three daughters Elizabeth Mary Pryor Treweek, Helen Pryor Treweek, Ann Pryor Treweek and one son David Pryor Treweek. The eldest daughter, Elizabeth Mary Pryor Treweek, died shortly after birth in 1945. Their son, David Treweek, who died at 35, predeceased his parents.
