= Loutrophoros =

Ancient Greek vase shape

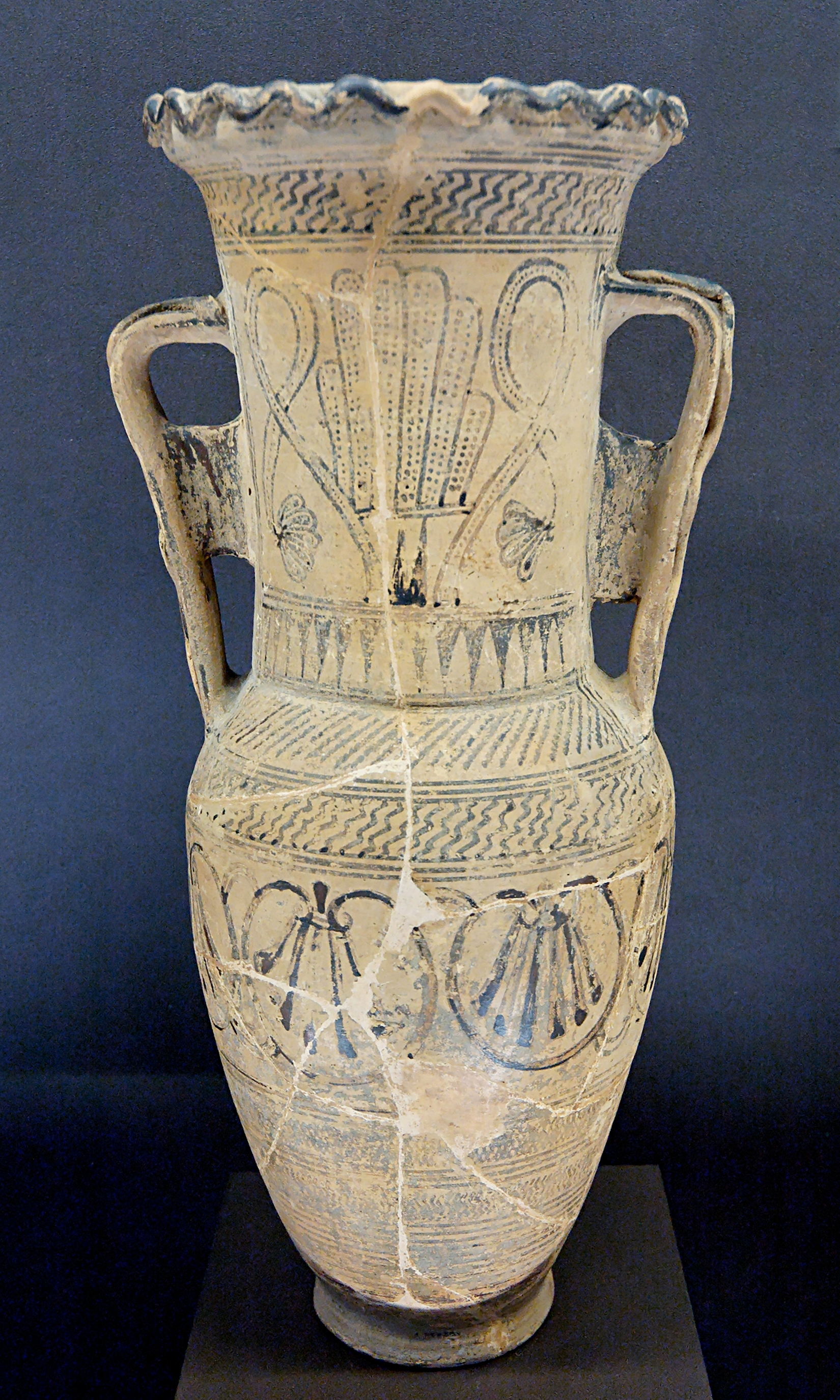
Protoattic loutrophoros-amphora by the Analatos Painter, c. 680 BC, Louvre (CA 1960)

A loutrophoros (Ancient Greek: λουτροφόρος, romanized: loutrophóros, lit. 'loutrophoros'; Greek etymology: λουτρόν/loutron and φέρω/pherō, English translation: "bathwater" and "carry") is a distinctive type of Greek pottery vessel characterized by an elongated neck with two handles. The loutrophoros was used to carry water for a bride's pre-nuptial ritual bath, and in funeral rituals, and was placed in the tombs of the unmarried. The loutrophoros itself is a motif for Greek tombstones, either as a relief (for instance, the lekythos on the Stele of Panaetius) or as a stone vessel. There are many in the funeral area at the Kerameikos in Athens, some of which are now preserved in the National Archaeological Museum of Athens.

== Gallery ==
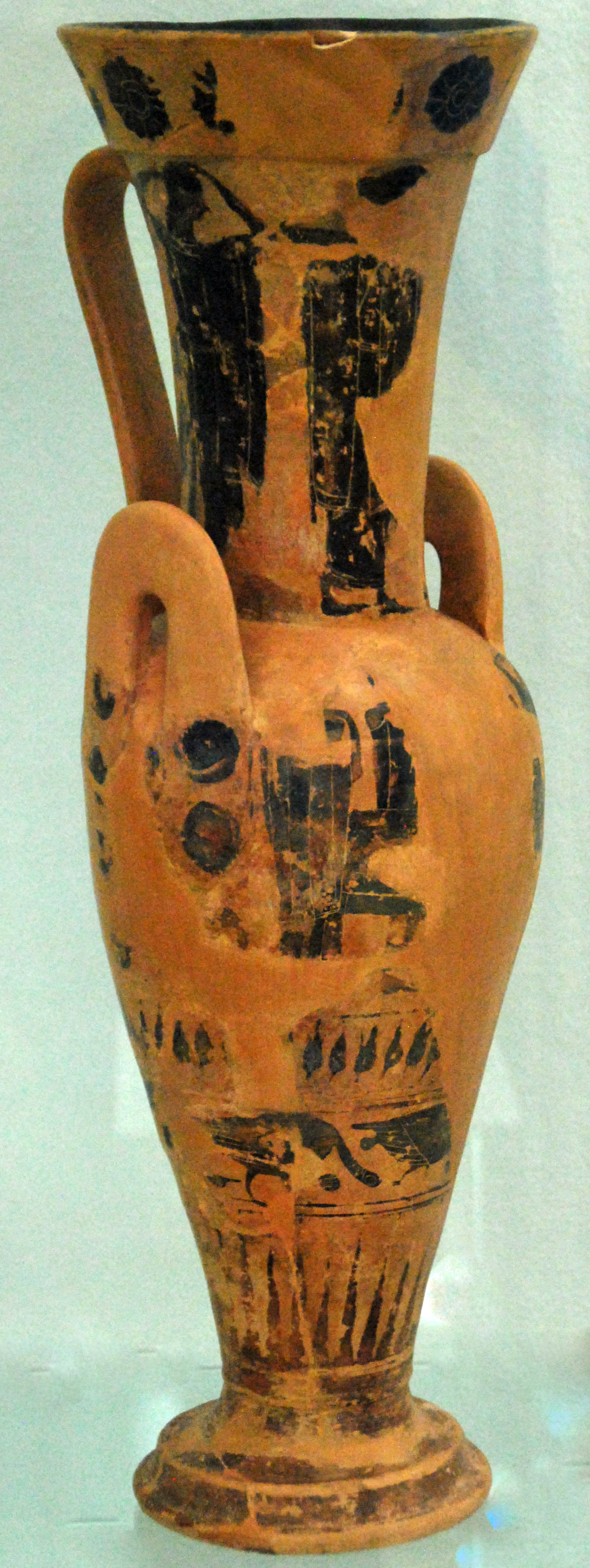
Attic black-figure loutrophoros-hydria; late 6th century BC

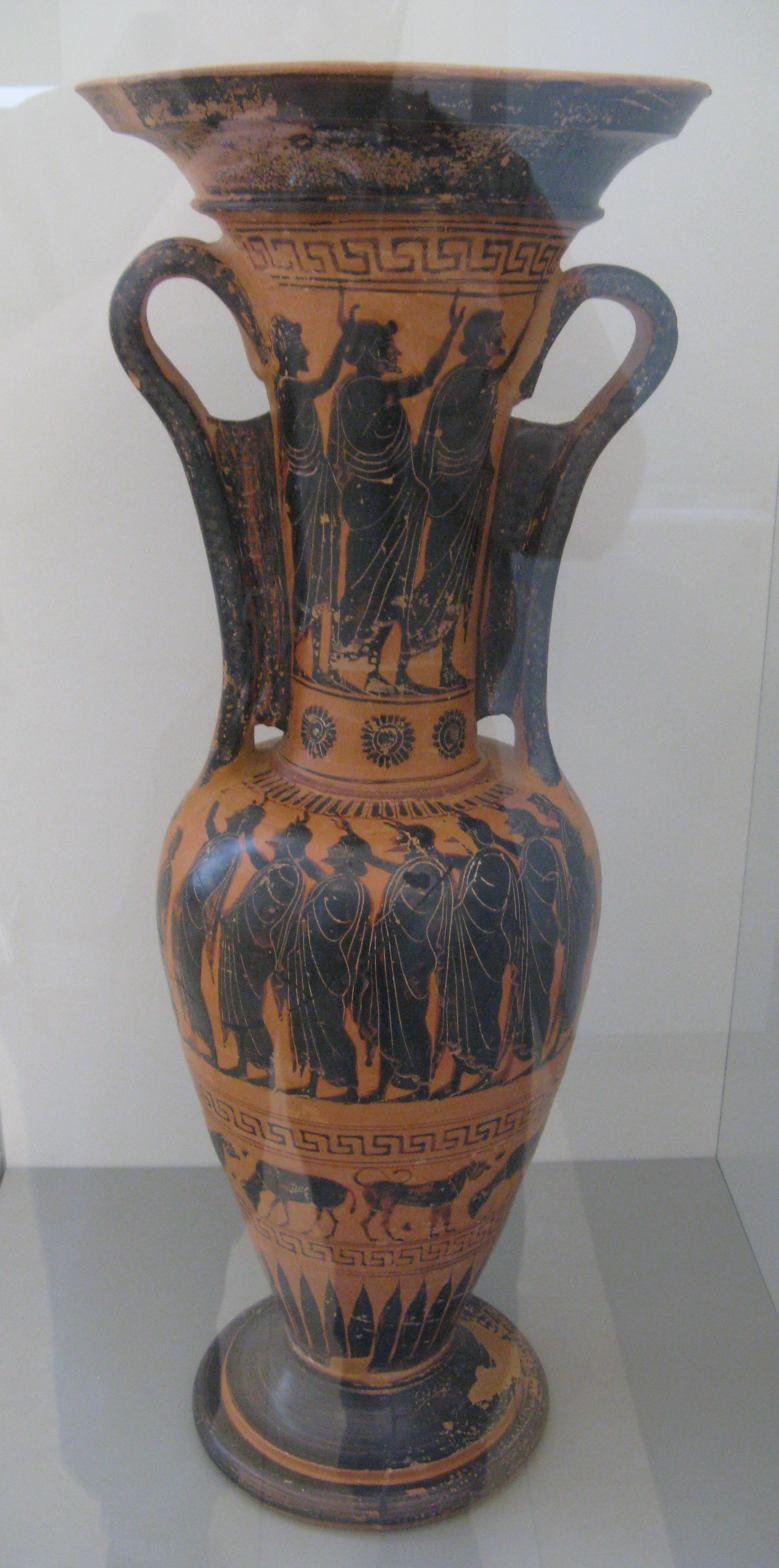
Attic black-figure loutrophoros-amphora with a prothesis scene, 510–500 BC

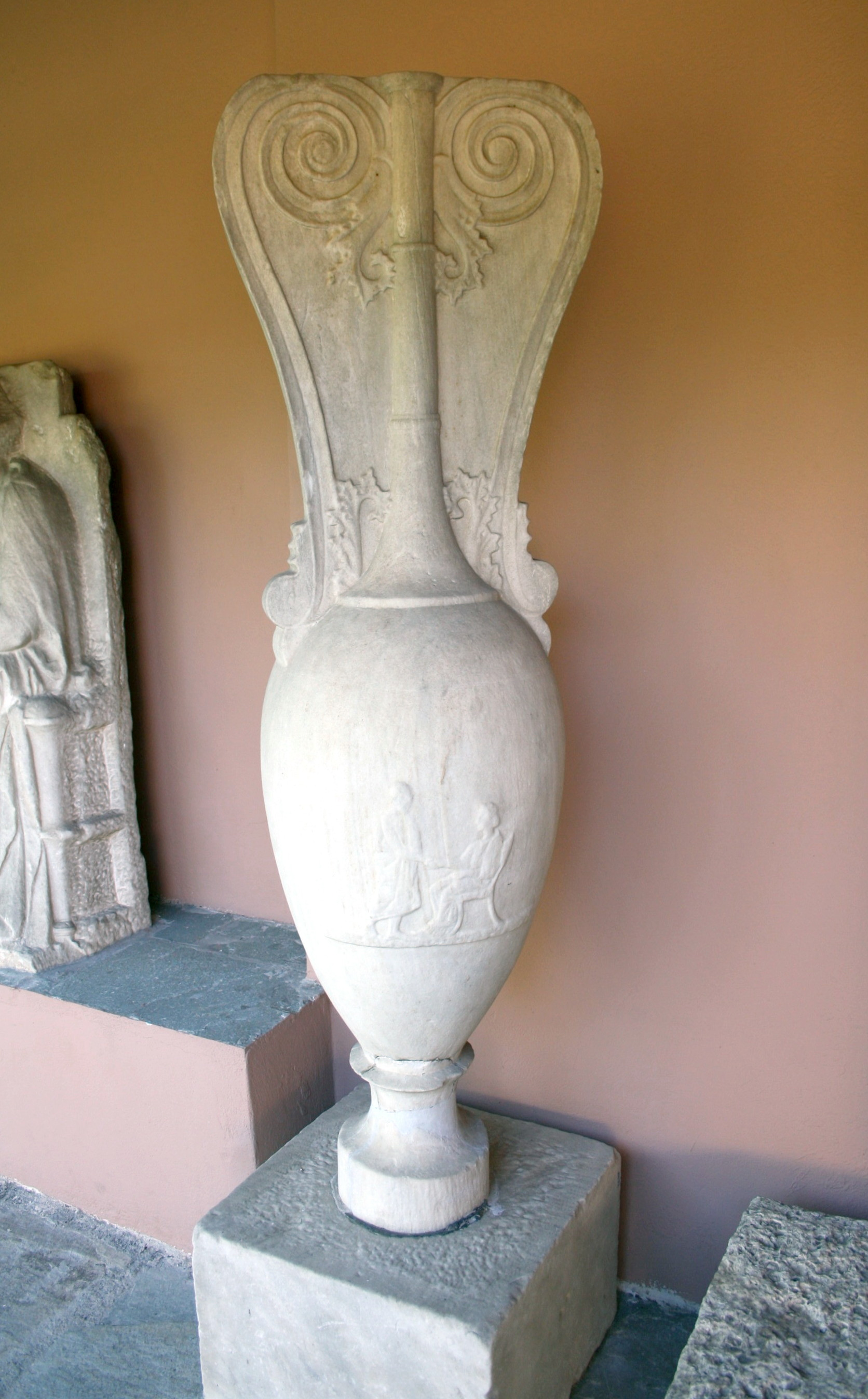
Keramikos Museum, Athens, Marble loutrophoros from the grave of Agathon and Sosykrates

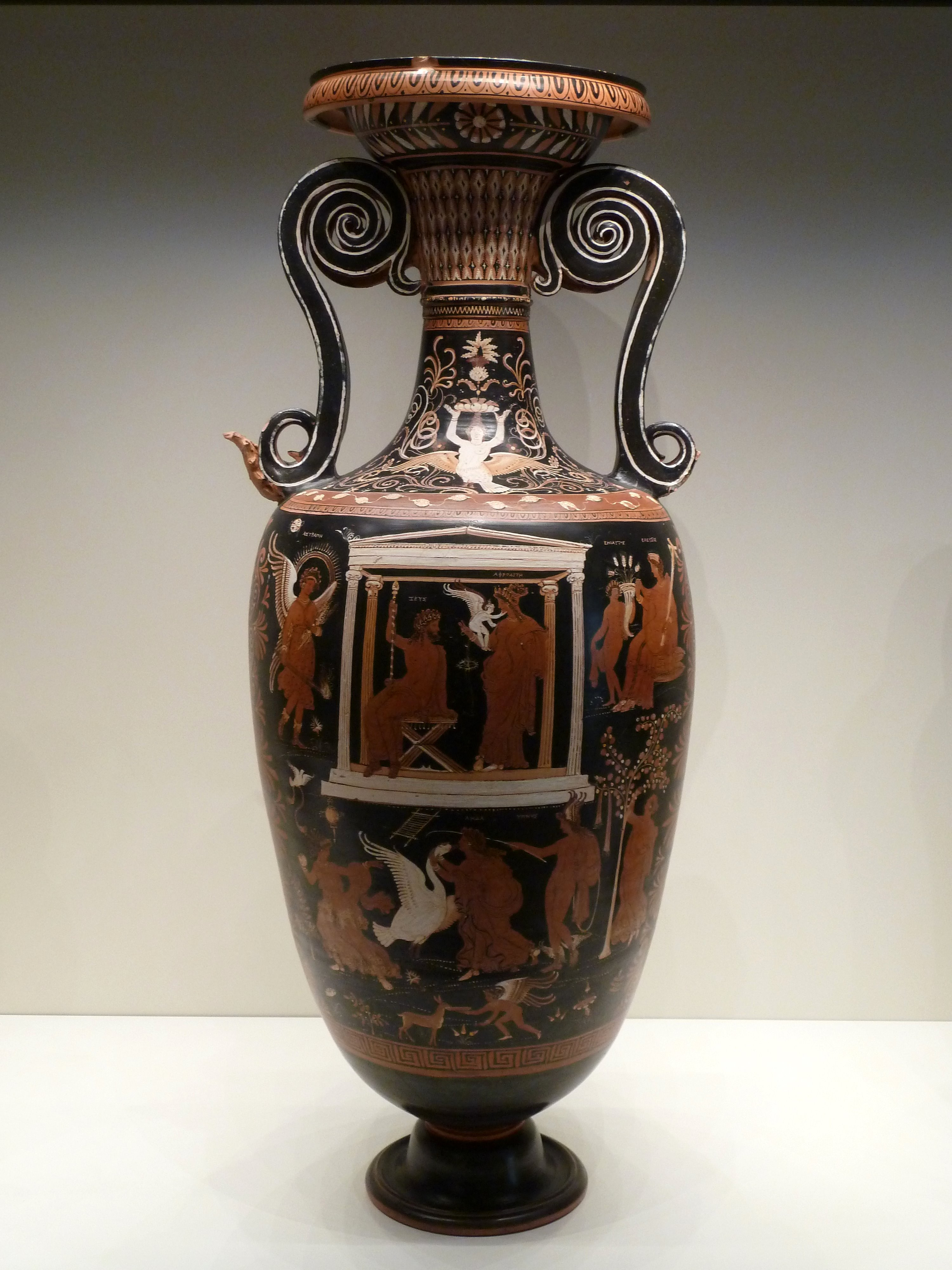
Apulian egg-shaped loutrophoros (Apulian typus I, variant I), 330 BC

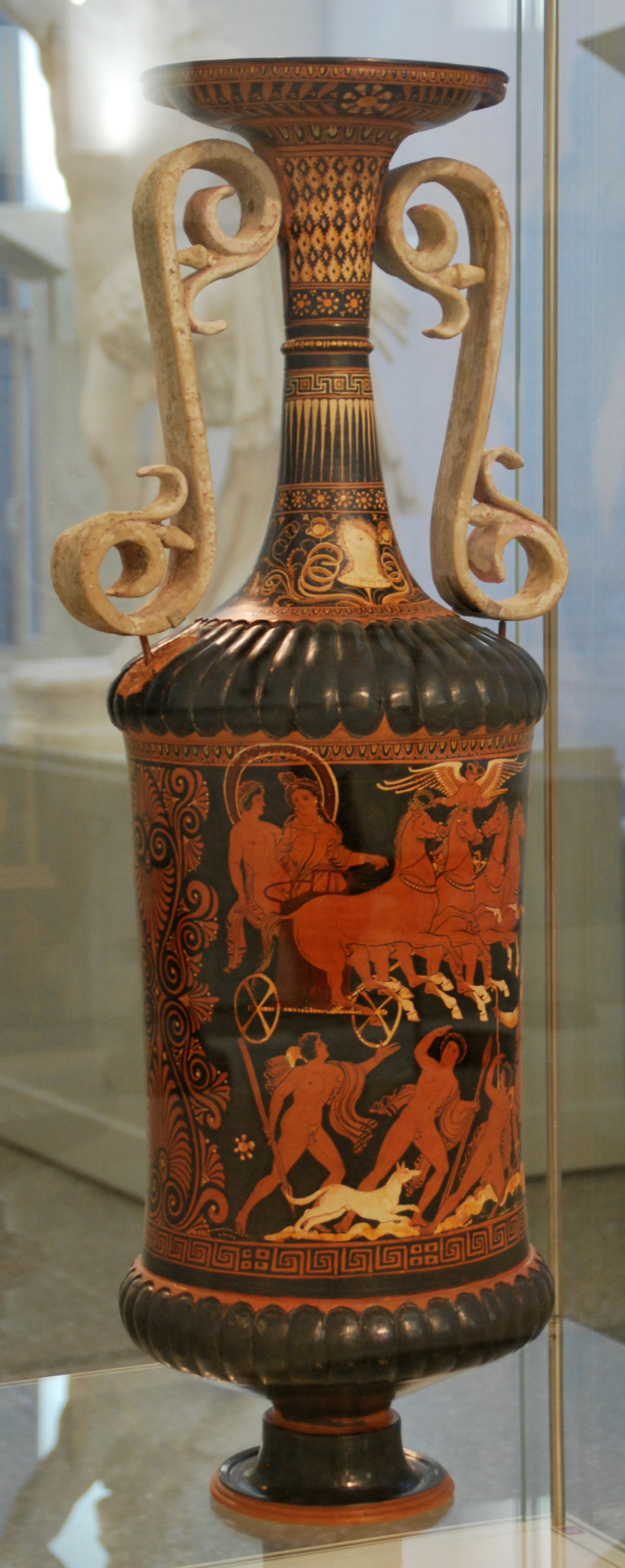
Oversize ("huge") Apulian cylinder-shaped loutrophoros (Apulian typus II, variant I), 330 BC

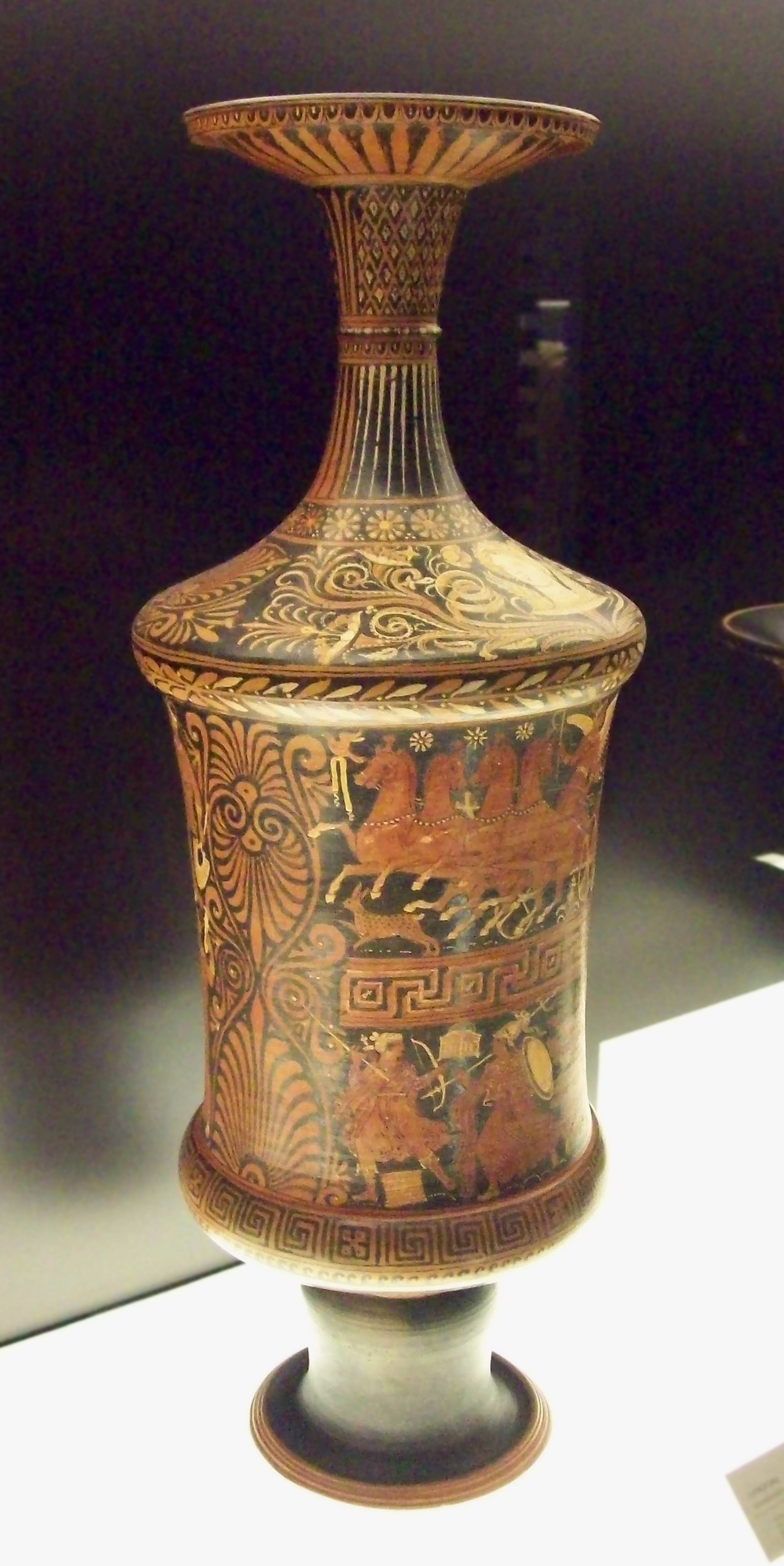
Apulian cylinder-shaped loutrophoros (Apulian typus II, variant II) by the Baltimore Painter; c. 330 BC; Museo Arqueológico Nacional de España (1998/92/2)

== See also ==
- Ancient Greek vase painting
- Pottery of ancient Greece

== Sources ==
- Richter, Gisela M. A. (1928). A Newly Acquired Loutrophoros. The Metropolitan Museum of Art Bulletin, Vol. 23, No. 2, Part 1, pp. 54–57.
