= Hazel Treweek =

Australian academic and teacher

Hazel Treweek MBE
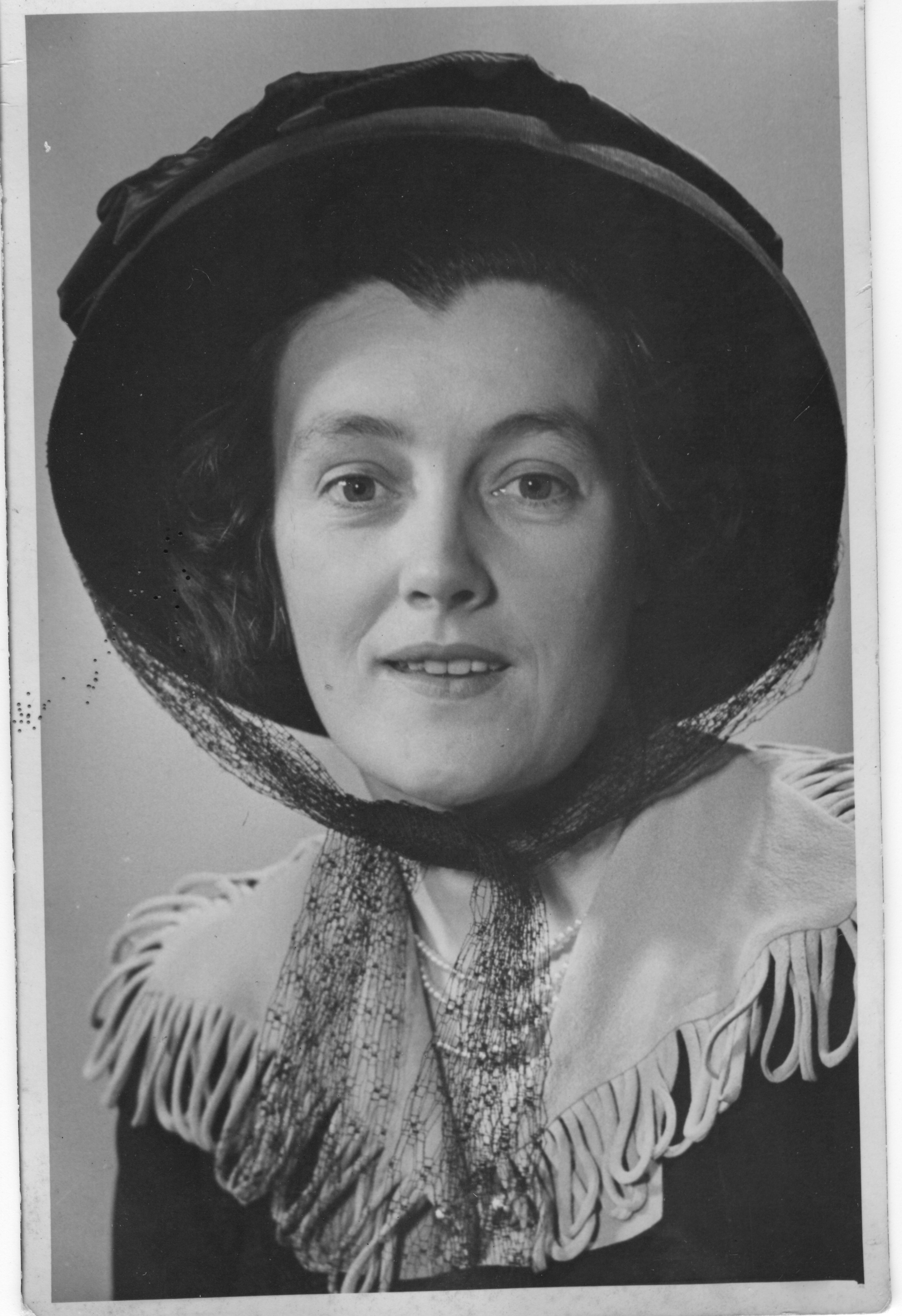
- Hazel Treweek in 1948
- Born: Hazel Elizabeth Logue; 1919 or 1920; Tamworth, New South Wales, Australia
- Died: 2006 (aged 86)
- Education: University of Sydney
- Spouse: Athanasius Treweek (m. 1942; died 1995)
- Children: 4
- Relatives: Michael Logue

Hazel Treweek (c. 1919/1920 – 2006) was an Australian academic, teacher and Shakespearean scholar. She was married to Athanasius "Ath" Treweek, an Australian academic, linguist and World War II cryptographer/codebreaker.

== Biography ==
Born as Hazel Elizabeth Logue in Tamworth, New South Wales, a daughter of Augustine and Gertrude Logue, she was a voracious reader who wanted to be a teacher. She was the first in her family to matriculate, and got a Teachers College scholarship to train as a kindergarten teacher.

She met her future husband, "Ath" Treweek, a lecturer in Greek at Sydney University, at one of the Logues' musical evenings in 1937; they were soon engaged. "Ath" Treweek was a gifted linguist. Referring to his access to decrypted Japanese messages in the Pacific theater, Hazel recalled that he remarked "I can't tell you anything about it, but Japan has just lost the war!"

Hazel stayed in Sydney teaching kindergarten at Naremburn and Roseville public schools and did an arts degree with honours part-time. She was a natural teacher and wanted to defer marriage as she would then have to resign from her job. In 1942 Hazel married "Ath" at St. Mary's Cathedral, and moved to Melbourne, where she was appointed senior English mistress at Lauriston, a leading private girls' school.

Their first child, Elizabeth, died in 1945 a few hours after birth. Helen was born in 1947. Ann was born in London in 1950 and, following their return, David, who predeceased his mother, was born in 1952.

=== Post World War II ===
In 1949, the family went to England for "Ath", who had received a Nuffield Foundation fellowship, to do a doctorate on the evolution of the manuscript tradition of the Greek mathematician Pappus of Alexandria.

She became an English coach, gaining a reputation as one of the best English coaches on the North Shore line. Many of her students were Asian and in 1972 she was made an MBE for "assistance to international relations, as tutor and 'mother' to Asian students".

From 1978-80, she earned an M.A. in drama at the University of Sydney. From 1981-83 she undertook an acting course at the Ensemble Studios in North Sydney, culminating in her directing a production of Twelfth Night.

She was an honorary dramaturge and established an annual Shakespeare prize at the National Institute of Dramatic Art. She also did honorary work with the Sydney Theatre Company. In 1996 she received the Order of Australia for "teaching and encouragement of drama, particularly Shakespeare". Other awards included arts finalist in the Avon Spirit of Achievement Award.

== Religion ==
An Irish-Australian, Hazel Treweek was a deeply committed Roman Catholic, although in later years her views on religious and social issues reportedly became somewhat more liberal. One of her relations was Cardinal Michael Logue (1840 - 1924), Archbishop of Armagh and Primate of All-Ireland through World War I, the Easter Rising, the Irish War of Independence, the Anglo-Irish Treaty, which led to Partition and the resulting Irish Civil War.

== Death ==
Her last years were marked by arthritis and she underwent heart bypass surgery. But as she remarked at the launch of the foundation: "I don't have arthritis of the brain." Long a widow, she died of cancer, aged 86, and was survived by her daughters, Helen and Ann, and four grandchildren.

== Bibliography ==
- Roberts, Alan (2 January 2006). "All the world a stage for teacher and student". The Sydney Morning Herald.
