= Arthur Dale Trendall =

Australian classical archaeologist (1909–1995)

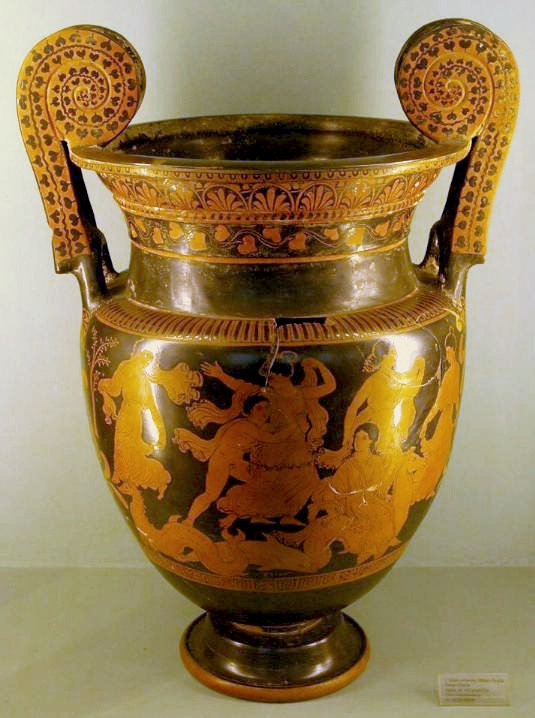
Sisyphus Painter Peleus and Thetis

Arthur Dale Trendall, AC, CMG (28 March 1909 – 13 November 1995) was a New Zealand art historian and classical archaeologist whose work on identifying the work of individual artists on Greek ceramic vessels at Apulia and other sites earned him international prizes and a papal knighthood.

== Life ==
Educated at the University of Otago (1926–29) and the University of Cambridge (1931–33), Trendall was professionally associated with the University of Sydney and Australian National University. He was Deputy Vice-Chancellor and Master of University House at the latter institution. From 1969 until his death he was Resident Fellow at La Trobe University in Melbourne.

== Wartime service ==
In January 1940, with the encouragement of the Australian Army, Trendall, together with some colleagues at the University of Sydney, began to study Japanese codes. The others were the mathematicians Thomas Gerald Room and Richard Lyons and the classicist Athanasius Treweek. In May 1941 Room and Treweek attended a meeting at the Victoria Barracks in Melbourne with the Director of Naval Intelligence of the Royal Australian Navy, several Australian Army intelligence officers and Eric Nave, an expert Japanese cryptographer with the Royal Australian Navy. As a result, it was agreed that Room's group, with the agreement of the University of Sydney, would move in August 1941 to work under Nave at the Special Intelligence Bureau in Melbourne. After the outbreak of war they were working for FRUMEL (Fleet Radio Unit Melbourne), a joint American-Australian intelligence unit, but when Lieutenant Rudolph Fabian took over command of FRUMEL and particularly when, in October 1942, FRUMEL was placed under direct control of the US Navy, civilians such as the member of Room's group were found surplus to requirements and returned to their academic posts.

== Legacy ==
According to Oliver Taplin, Trendall "almost single-handedly ... imposed order on the more than 20,000 known red-figure vases from Sicily, South Italy, Campania and Paestum, allocating each one to an area of production and approximate date, and attributing them to individual painters or groups of painters". Moreover, he was responsible for "superbly acute and well- informed observations on the subject-matter and interpretation of the vases, whether mythological, cultic, funerary, social, theatrical or artistic."

== Honours ==
In the New Years Honours of 1961, Trendall was appointed a Companion of the Order of St Michael and St George (CMG), in recognition of his service as "Vice-Chancellor" of the Australian National University.

On 20 July 1961 he was appointed Cavaliere Ufficiale Ordine al Merito della Repubblica Italiana.

In the Australia Day Honours of 1976, he was appointed a Companion of the Order of Australia.

In 1997 the Australian Academy of the Humanities, of which Prof. Trendall was a Foundation Fellow, inaugurated the Trendall Lectures. Some of those were published as printed booklets and others were published online or in the Humanities Australia journal. The Trendall Lecture "alternates between an Australian and an international scholar with a research interest in classical studies" and is delivered in conjunction with the conference of the Australasian Society for Classical Studies.

== Selected works ==
- Paestan Pottery: A Study of the Red-Figured Vases of Paestum (London: Macmillan, 1936)
- Frühitaliotische Vasen (Bilder griechischer Vasen, Heft 12) (Leipzig: Verlag Heinrich Keller, 1938)
- Vasi antichi dipinti del Vaticano: Vasi italioti ed etruschi a figure rosse (Città del Vaticano: 1953)
- Phlyax Vases. 2nd ed. (London: University of London: Institute of Classical Studies, 1967) (Bulletin Supplements, 19)
- The Red-Figured Vases of Lucania, Campania and Sicily [2 volumes: Vol. 1: Text; Vol. 2: Indexes and Plates.] (Oxford Monographs on Classical Archaeology) (Oxford: University Press, 1967)
- with T. B. L. Webster: Illustrations of Greek Drama (London: Phaidon, 1971; New York: Praeger Publishers, 1971)
- Early South Italian Vase-Painting. Revised 1973 (Forschungen zur antiken Keramik, Heft 12) (Mainz am Rhein: Verlag Phillip von Zabern, 1974)
- with Alexander Cambitoglou: The Red-Figured Vases of Apulia, 1. Early and Middle Apulian (Oxford Monographs on Classical Archaeology) (Oxford: Clarendon Press, 1978)
- with Alexander Cambitoglou: The Red-Figured Vases of Apulia, 2. Late Apulian. Indexes (Oxford Monographs on Classical Archaeology) (Oxford: Clarendon Press, 1982)
- with Alexander Cambitoglou: The Red-Figured Vases of Apulia, Indexes (Oxford Monographs on Classical Archaeology) (Oxford: Clarendon Press, 1982). Contents: 1. Collections, 2. Concordance with CVA and other publications, 3. Mythological Representations, 4. General, 5. Vase-Painters and Groups. Also: a table of stylistic and chronological relations.
- The Red-Figured Vases of Lucania, Campania and Sicily. Third Supplement. Consolidated (Bulletin Supplements, 41) (University of London: Institute of Classical Studies, 1983)
- with Alexander Cambitoglou: First Supplement to the Red-Figured Vases of Apulia (Bulletin Supplements, 42) (University of London: Institute of Classical Studies, 1983)
- with Ian McPhee: Greek Red-Figured Fish-Plates (Beiheft zur Halbjahresschrift Antike Kunst, 14) (Basel: Vereinigung der Freunde Antiker Kunst c/o Archäologisches Seminar der Universität, 1987)
- The Red-Figured Vases of Paestum (Rome: British School at Rome, 1987)
- Red Figure Vases of South Italy and Sicily: A Handbook. London: Thames and Hudson 1989; German language edition: Rotfigurige Vasen aus Unteritalien und Sizilien: Ein Handbuch. (Kulturgeschichte der antiken Welt, Band 47) Mainz am Rhein: Philipp von Zabern, 1991. ISBN 3-8053-1111-7
- with Ian McPhee: "Addenda to 'Greek Red-figured fish-plates'". In: Antike Kunst 33 (1990) 31–51
- with Alexander Cambitoglou: Second Supplement to the Red-Figured Vases of Apulia, 1–3 (University of Bulletin Supplements, 60) (University of London: Institute of Classical Studies, 1991–92)
- Ian McPhee, ed.: Myth, Drama and Style in South Italian Vase-Painting: Selected Papers by A.D. Trendall. (Studies in Mediterranean Archaeology and Literature, PB 182) (Uppsala: Åströms förlag, 2016)

== Secondary literature ==
- Ian McPhee, 'Arthur Dale Trendall 1909–1995. A Memoir', Proceedings of the British Academy, 97 (1998), 501–517. Reprinted in Myth, Drama and Style in South Italian Vase Painting, edited by Ian McPhee, Studies in Mediterranean Archaeology PB 182 (Astrom Editions, 2016).
- Alexander Cambitoglou (ed.), Studies in honour of Arthur Dale Trendall (Sydney: Sydney University Press, 1979).
- 'Arthur Dale Trendall. Bibliography 1934–1987', in Greek colonists and native populations, Proceedings of the First Australian Congress of Classical Archaeology, Sydney 9–14 July 1985 (Canberra 1990) 649–655.
- The Times (London), 4. December 1995.
- John Richard Green, Ian McPhee, '"Kein Wort von ihnen, schau und geh vorüber": Zum Tod von Arthur Dale Trendall', Antike Welt 27 (1996) 67–68.
- Henri Metzger, 'Arthur Dale Trendall, 1909 – 1995', Revue archéologique 1996, 411–413.
- L. Cozza Luzi, 'Arthur Dale Trendall, 1909–1995', Atti della Pontificia academia romana di Archeologia. Rendiconti 70 (1997–98) 321–322.
