= Cratillus, son of Machatas =

Ancient gymnasiarch in Nikaia, Illyria

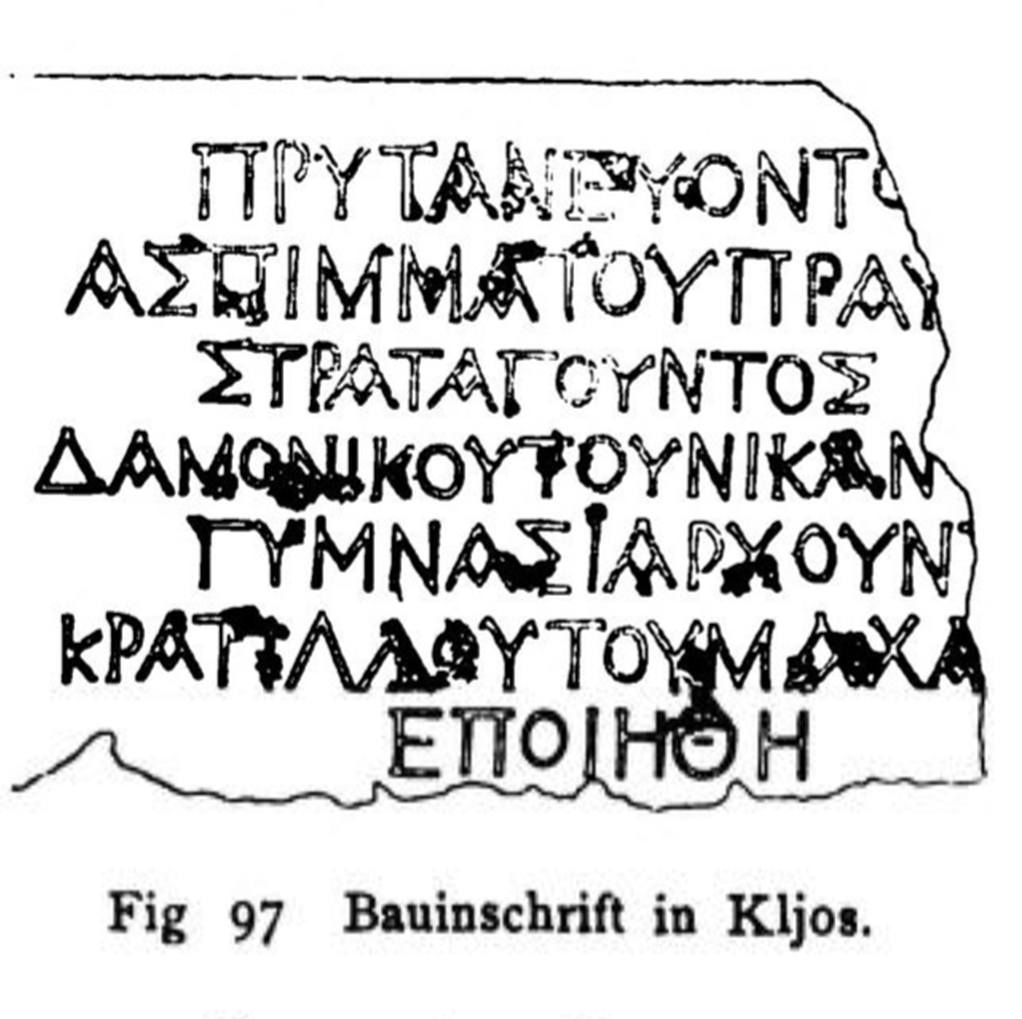
Inscription found in Kljos (Albania) reading his name in genitive: "ΚΡΑΤΤΥΛΟΥ toy MAXA(TA)" according to the book from Patsch, Carl (1904). Das Sandschak Berat in Albanie (in German). Wien: Wien Hölder. p. col 119. OCLC 257545166..

Cratillus, son of Machatas (Ancient Greek: Κρατίλλος του Μαχάτα Kratillos tou Machata) was a 3rd century BC gymnasiarch from the ancient city of Nikaia one of the main settlements of the Illyrian tribe of the Bylliones.

== Biography ==
His name is mentioned once in an inscription found in Nikaia, modern Klos, Mallakastër. The inscription dates to the 3rd century BC. In this inscription Kratyllos bears the title of the gymnasiarch named, while his father's name (Machatas) is also mention in the same sentence:

Ancient Greek; "Πρυτανεύοντο[ς Ασπίμμα του Πραύ[λου? στραταγουντος Δαμονίκου του Νικάν[δρου, γυμνασιαρχουντ[ος Κρατίλλου του Μαχά[τα, εποιήθη"

English: "When prytaneis was Aspima Praugu, strategos Damonik Nikandri, gymnasiarch Kratill Mahata, was built (this building)".

Albanian: "Kur ishte prytan Aspima Praugu, strateg Damonik Nikandri, gimnasiark Kratill Mahata, u bë (kjo godinë)".

German: "als Prytan Aspima Praugu, Stratege Damonik Nikandri und Gymnasiat Kratill Mahata waren, wurdedieses Gebäude gebaut".

A second-century inscription was found in the Oropos, central Greece, where a young man from the city of Nikaia was the first to be listed among the winners of the Amphiaraos festival. "It was also an honor for the city gymnasium, where the champion was prepared."

== See also ==
- Illyria
- Illyrians
- Illyrian kingdom
- Illyrian education
- Culture of ancient Illyria
