= Mark Lugari =

Ancient illyrian schoolteacher

Mark Lugari (or Mark Lukari) was a teacher from the ancient city of Apollonia (Illyria) who lived in the late 3rd century and early 2nd century BC.

== Biography ==
We know very few things about his life. The name of ancient schoolteacher Mark Lugari is mentioned in some inscriptions from his time. During the archeological excavations in Apollonia, in the tomb of the teacher Mark Lugari, the writing tools that were used by the students in the school at that time were discovered. On the belt of this teacher hung a leather holder, in the holes of which were inserted writing sheets of papyrus or parchment, collected in a cylindrical shape. At the end was a metal hook for catching squid and holding a pencil (pen). On his tombstone, the stonemason also carved a diptych (quadrangular writing board) there. In this way are given both ways in which it was written at that time. Both forms were expensive for beginners to use. Therefore the most practical were the wax-painted quadrangular tables where the letters were scratched with the tip of a pencil.

== See also ==
- Illyria
- Illyrians
- Illyrology
- Illyrian kingdom
- Illyrian education
- Culture of ancient Illyria
