= Tirana Mosaic =

Coordinates: 41°19′48″N 19°48′15″E

- Mozaiku i Tiranës (Albanian)
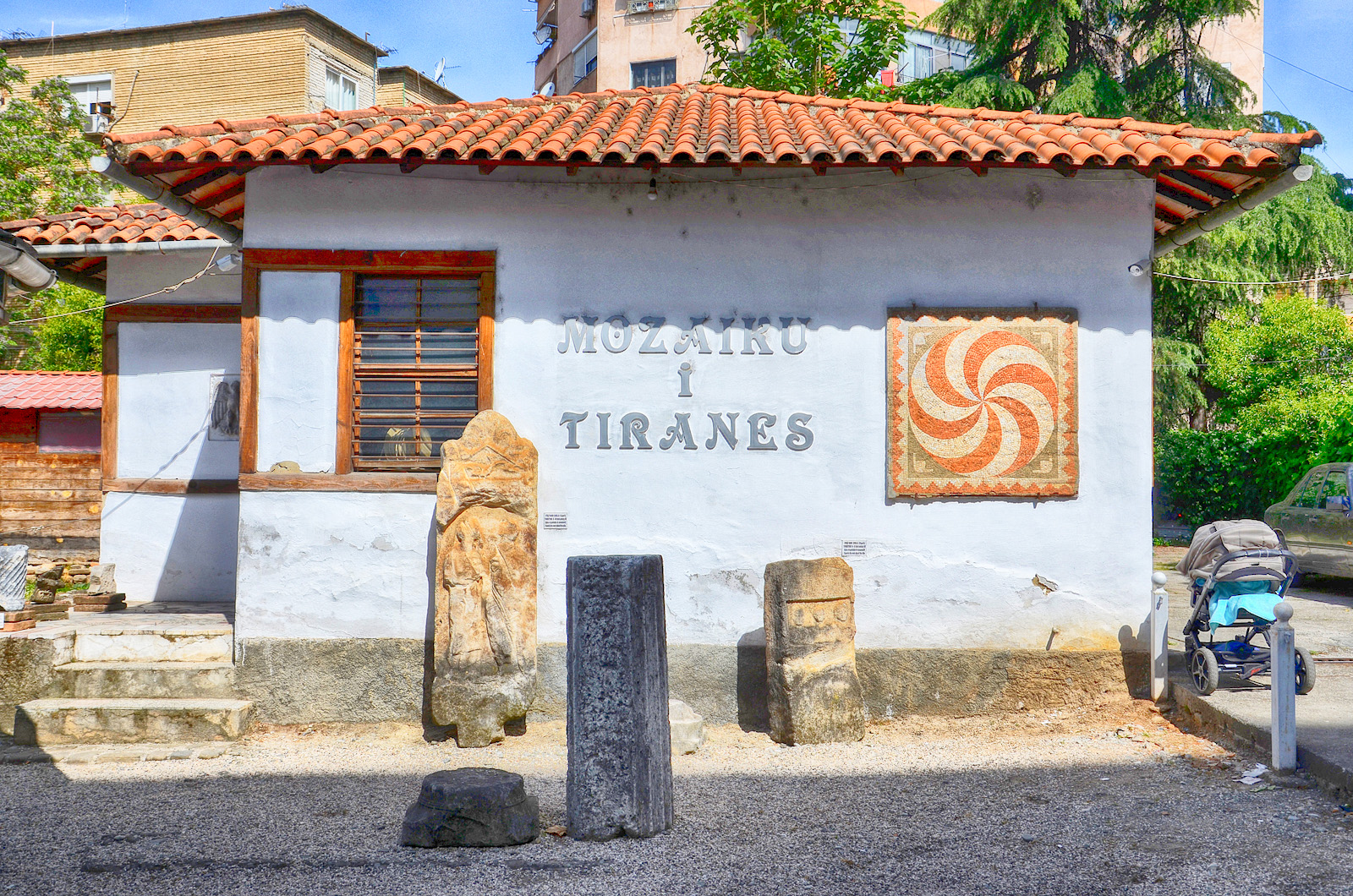
- Interactive map of Tirana Mosaic
- Location: Tirana (Albania)

History
- Built: c. 300 AD

Cultural Monument of Albania
- Designated: 10 June 1973

The Tirana Mosaic (Albanian: Mozaiku i Tiranës) is a landmark in Tirana, Albania.

It is believed to have been part of a 3rd-century Roman house, referred to by local archeologists as the 'Villa rustica'. Later, in the 5th and 6th centuries, a Paleo-Christian Basilica was built around this site. It was declared a cultural monument of the first category in June 1973.

The ruins of this Paleo-Christian Basilica were discovered in 1972. In 2002, some other objects were found around the ruins of the house, and today they form the archaeological complex in Tirana. It is the only archaeological monument within the city. Some of the ancient mosaics discovered at the site that feature diverse geometrical patterns and depict poultry and fish. It was re-opened to the public on 23 January 2010.

== Gallery ==
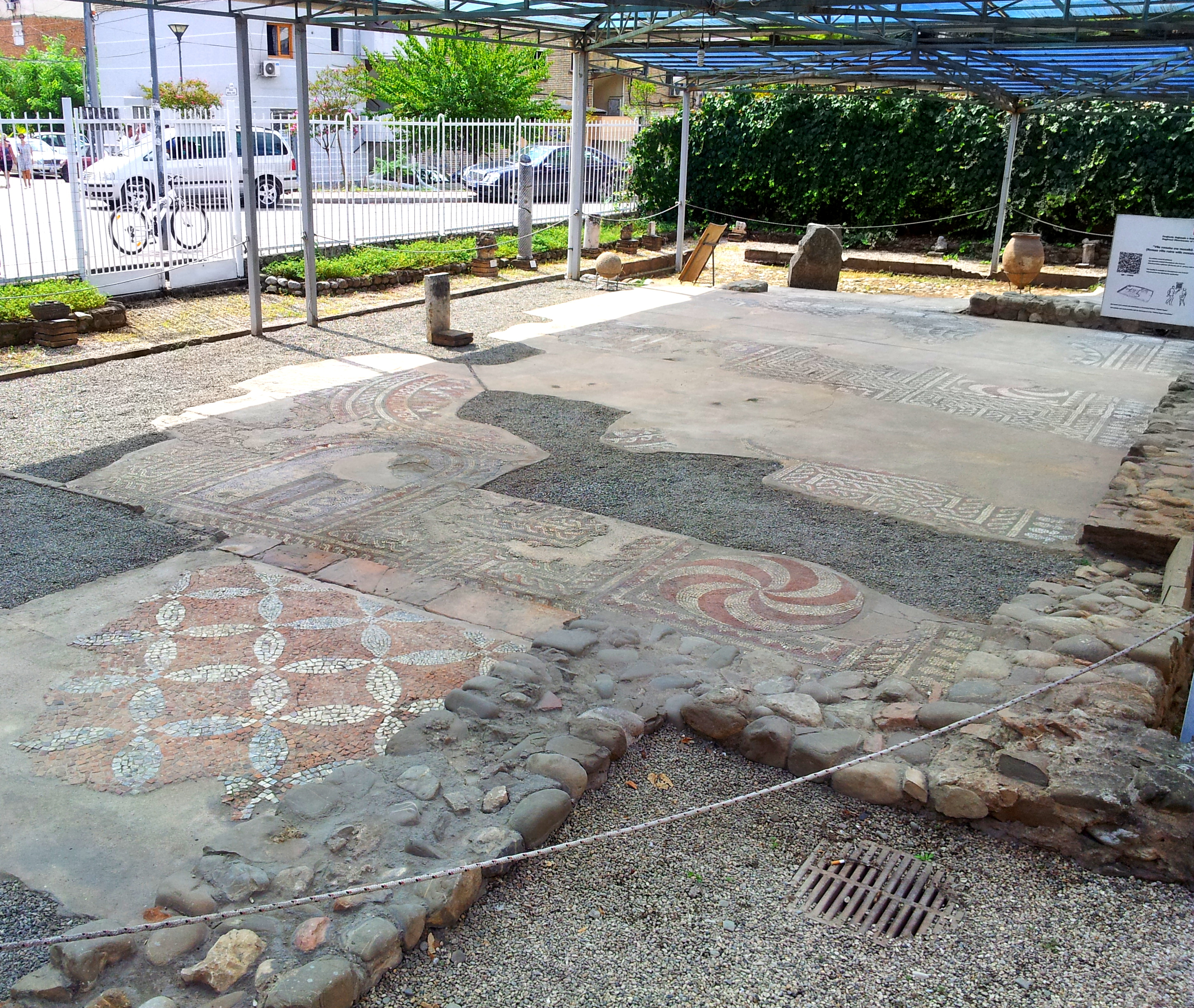

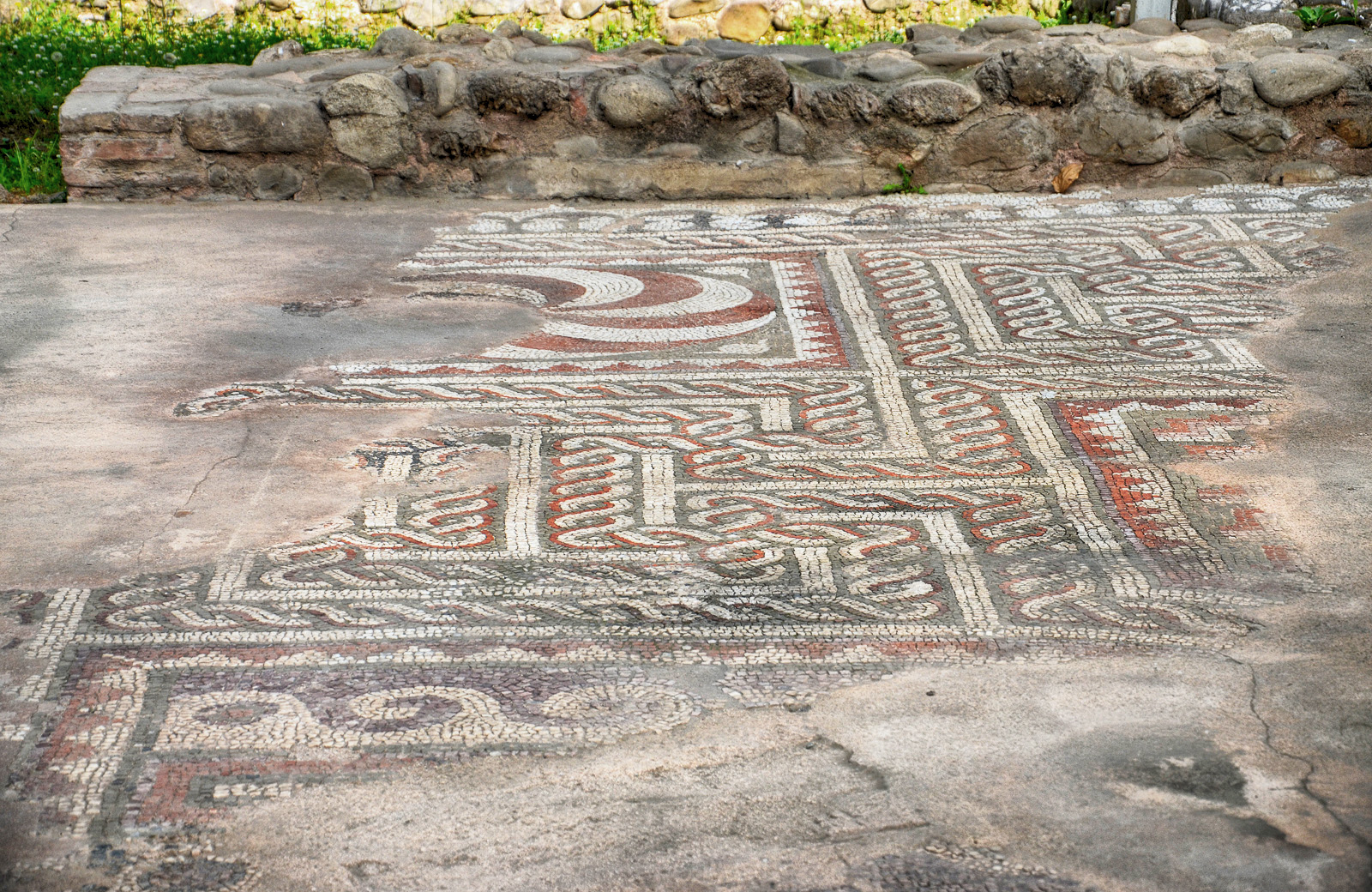

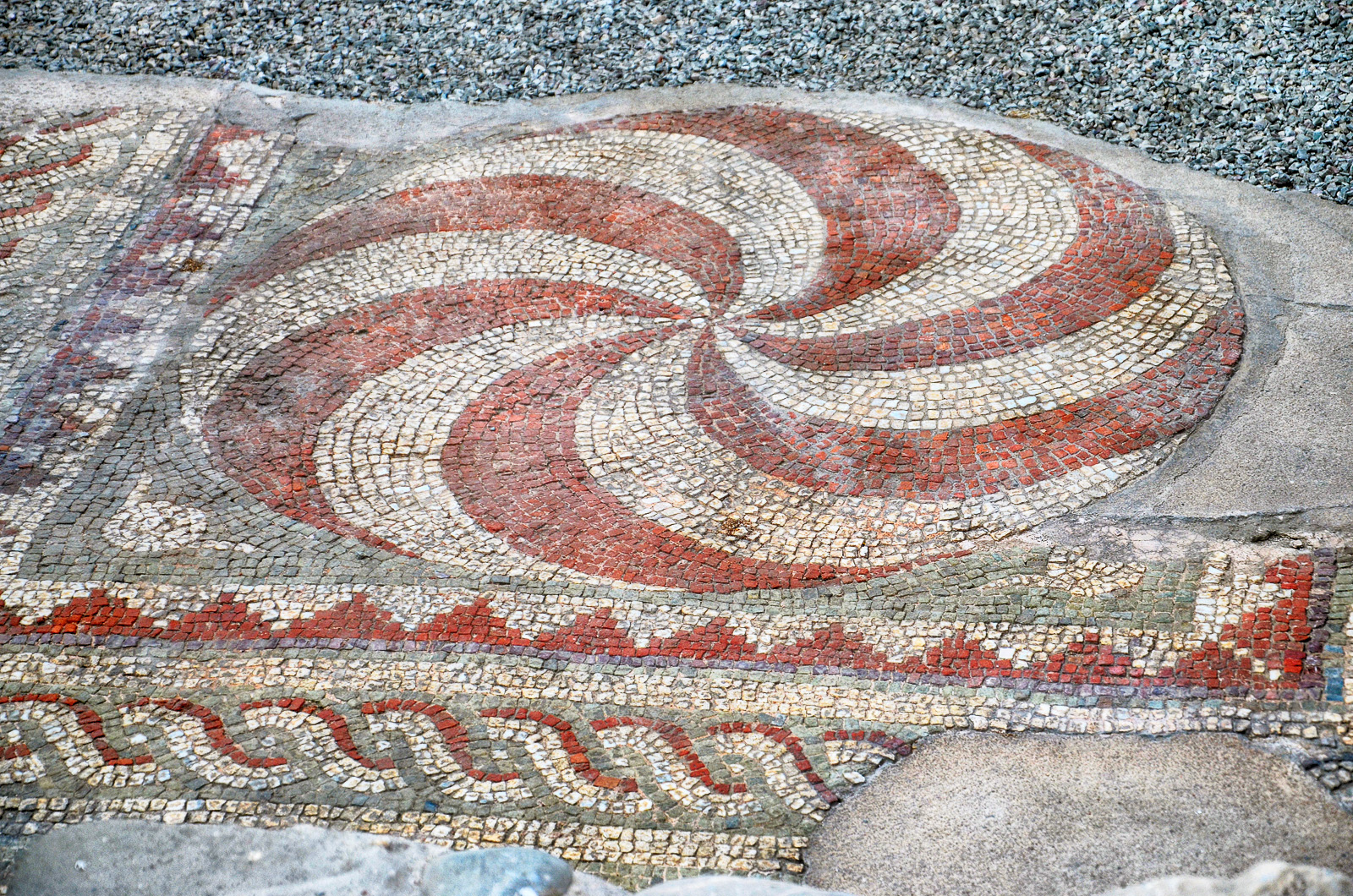

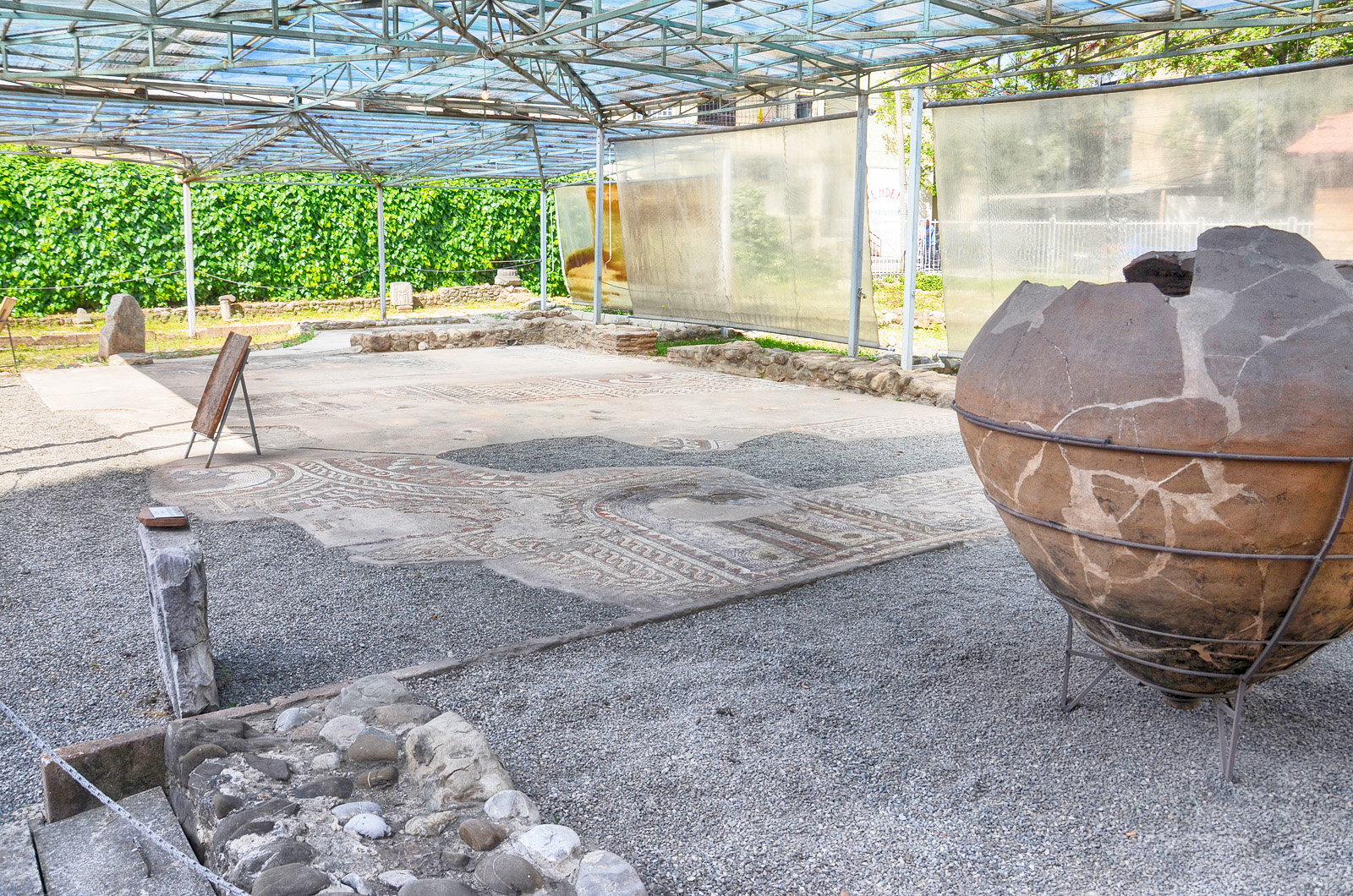
