= Daunian pottery =

Local ancient ceramics style in south Italy

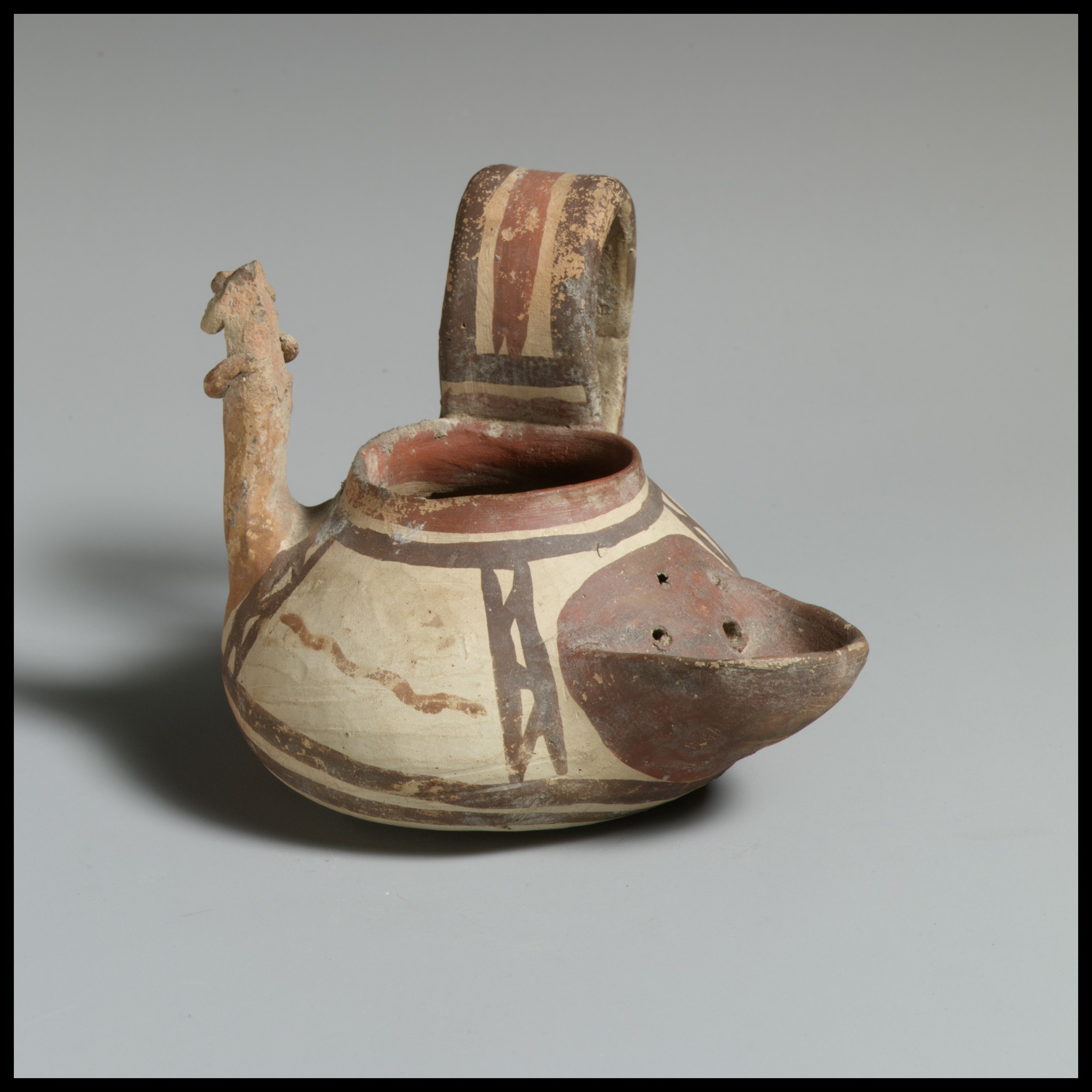
Terracotta one-handled vase with strainer. Daunian, mid 5th century BC

Daunian pottery was produced in Daunia, located in the modern Italian provinces of Barletta-Andria-Trani and Foggia. It was created by the Daunians, a tribe of the Iapygian civilization who had probably migrated from Illyria.

== History ==
Daunian pottery production began around 700 BC in regional centers such as Ordona and Canosa di Puglia. The early designs featured geometric patterns painted on the pottery. These ceramics were hand-formed rather than made on a potter's wheel.

== Materials and techniques ==
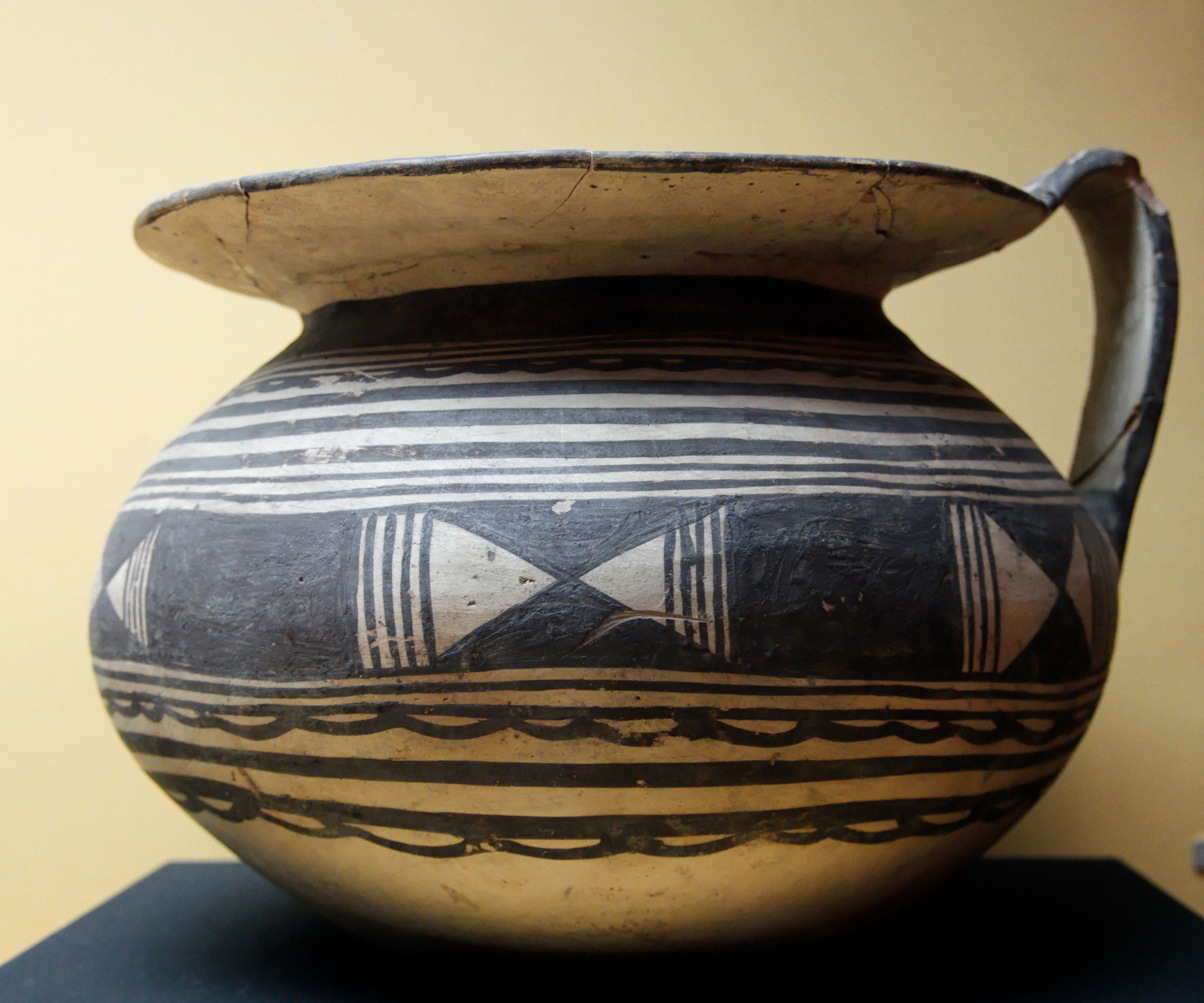
Daunian pot, Terracotta, Subgeometric style (Daunian II), 550-400 BC

Daunian pottery was typically decorated with red, brown, or black earth colors. The common motifs included diamonds, triangles, circles, equilateral crosses, squares, arcs, and several swastika patterns. The development of Daunian pottery styles occurred independently from early Greek ceramics.

== Forms and styles ==
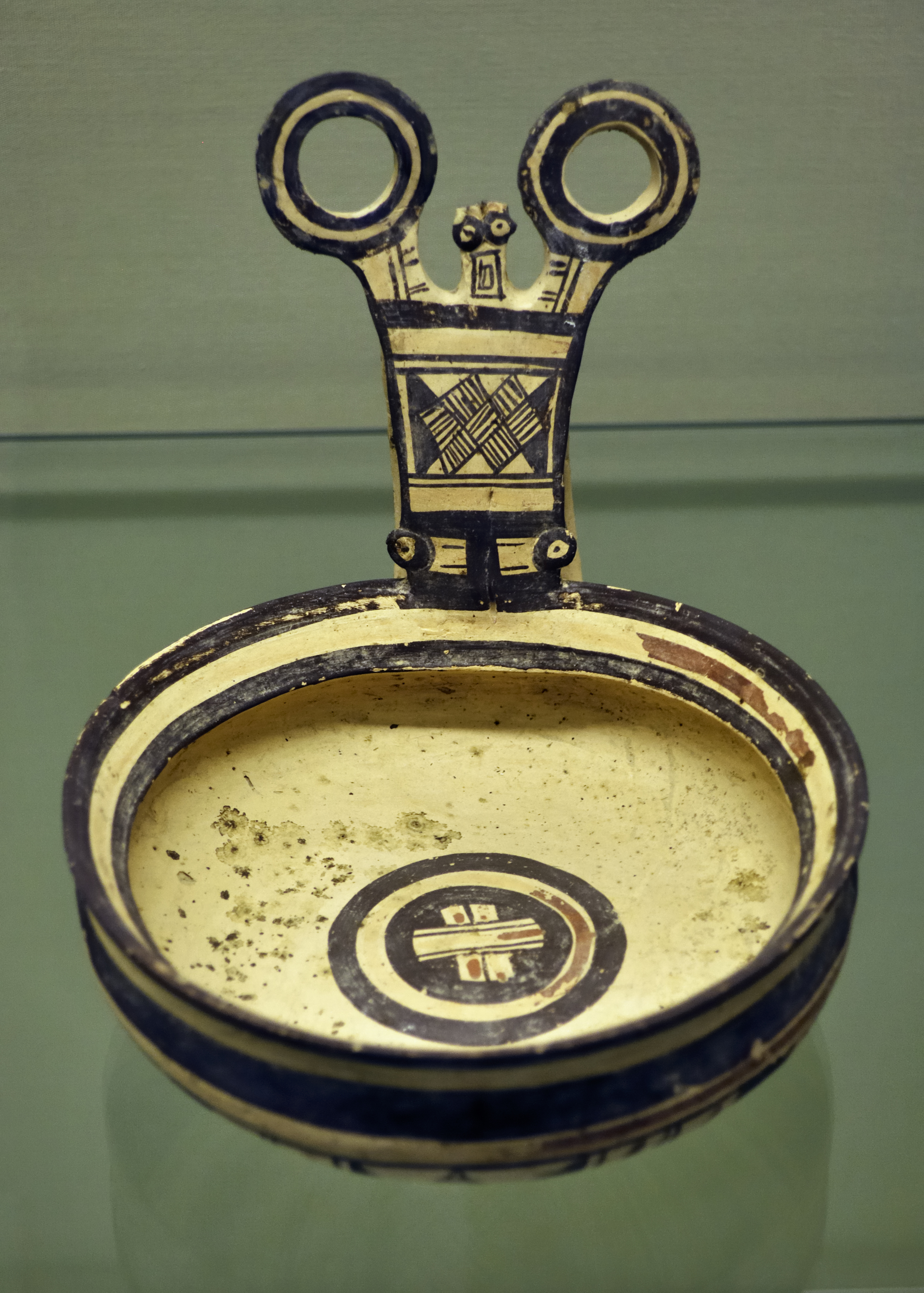
Daunian subgeometric Kyathos, 550–440 BC

Typical Daunian pottery forms include the askos, hopper vessels, and bowls with loop handles. Notably, some pieces feature manual or anthropomorphic protomes attached to or depicted graphically on the sides and handles.

== Greek influence ==
From the fifth century BC, Daunian pottery began to exhibit influences from Greek styles, including the depiction of crude human, bird, and plant figures. Between 350 BC and 250 BC, the decorative styles evolved even further.

== Notable artifacts ==
Some of the notable Daunian pottery artifacts include various geometric designs and forms such as the askos and bowls with loop handles.

== Modern studies and collections ==
Modern archaeological studies have continued to explore and document Daunian pottery. Various museums and collections around the world, such as the Metropolitan Museum of Art and the British Museum, house significant collections of Daunian pottery.

== See also ==
- Illyrians
- Messapian pottery
- Peucetian pottery
