= Messapian pottery =

Type of pottery from 7th century BC

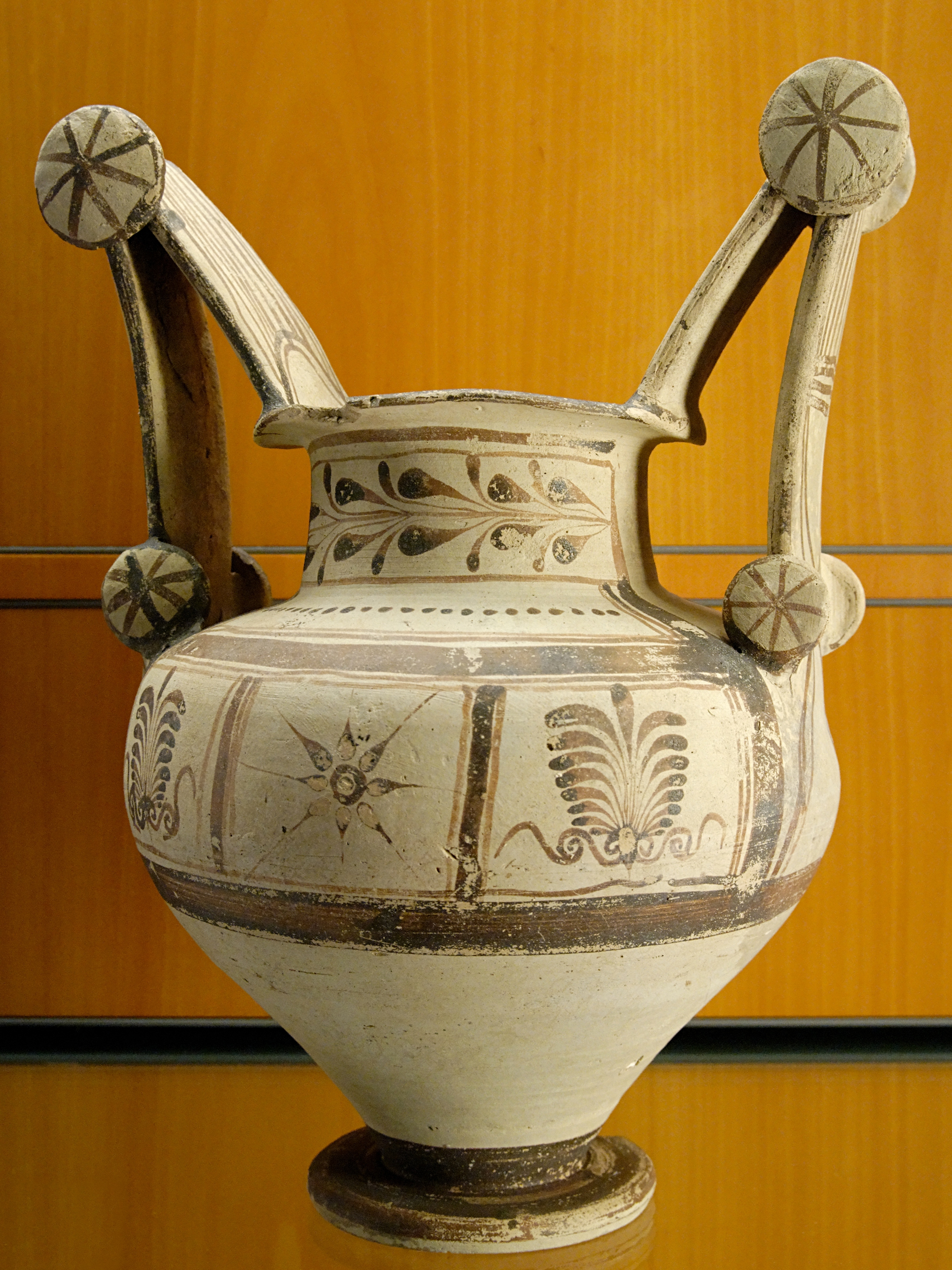
Trozzella, 4th century BC from Apulia

Messapian pottery is a type of Messapian ceramic, produced between the 7th century BC until the 3rd century BC on the Italian region of southern Apulia. Messapian pottery was made by the Messapii, an ancient people inhabiting the heel of Italy since around 1000 BC, who migrated from Crete and Illyria. Messapian pottery consisted first primarily, with geometric patterns like circles, squares, diamonds, horizontal dash patterns, swastika and other similar motifs. Late through Greek influence the meander was added. From about the beginning of the 5th century BC again under Greek influence, with imports of Attic pottery, figurative decoration was added. In addition, leaf motifs, new elements such as ivy and other repertoire were included. Up to then only fragments of the pottery was decorated in contrast to the whole surface being decorated after the 5th century BC. In the fourth century BC, the artists came back again to geometric ornamentation, but by then the ceramics were almost completely under Greek influence.

== Trozzella ==
The most dramatic of all the Messapian pottery forms was the trozzella, which in the local dialect means literally "little wheels". The Messapian trozzella was a pottery vase which generally had four little wheels at the summit and base of its sharp angled handles.

== See also ==
- South Italian ancient Greek pottery
- Daunian pottery
- Peucetian pottery
