= Illyrian education =

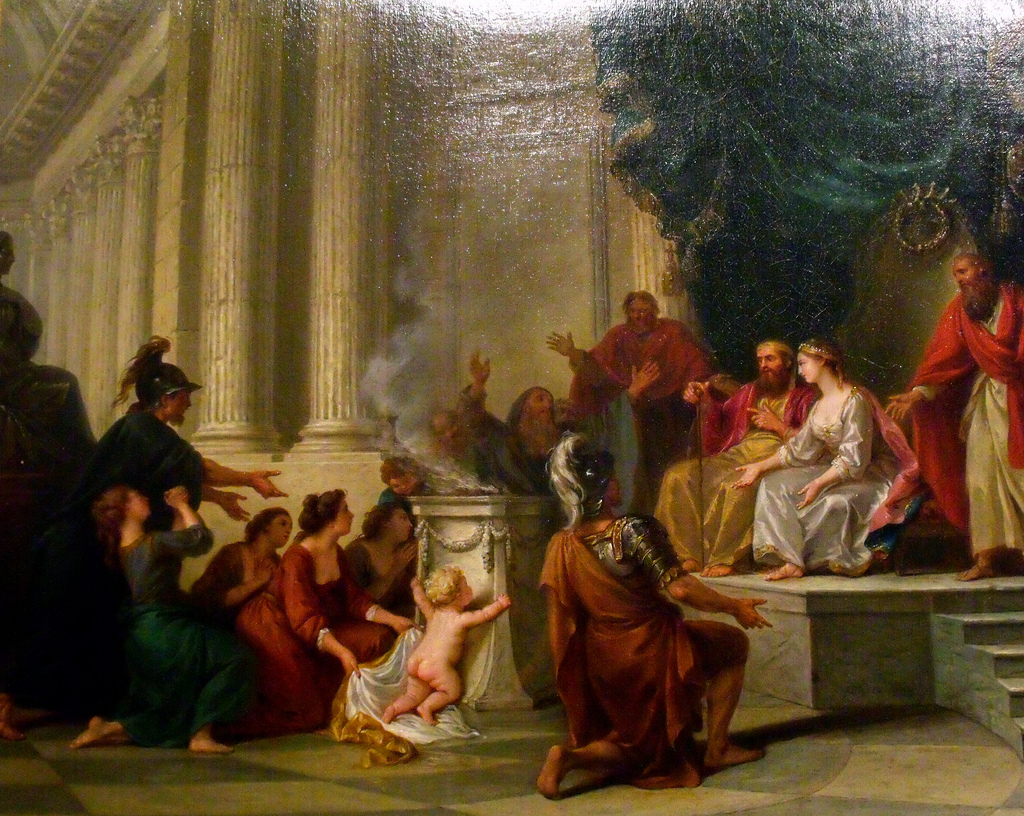
Pyrrhus, when a child, brought to Glaucias, king of Illyria and his wife Beroea for protection.

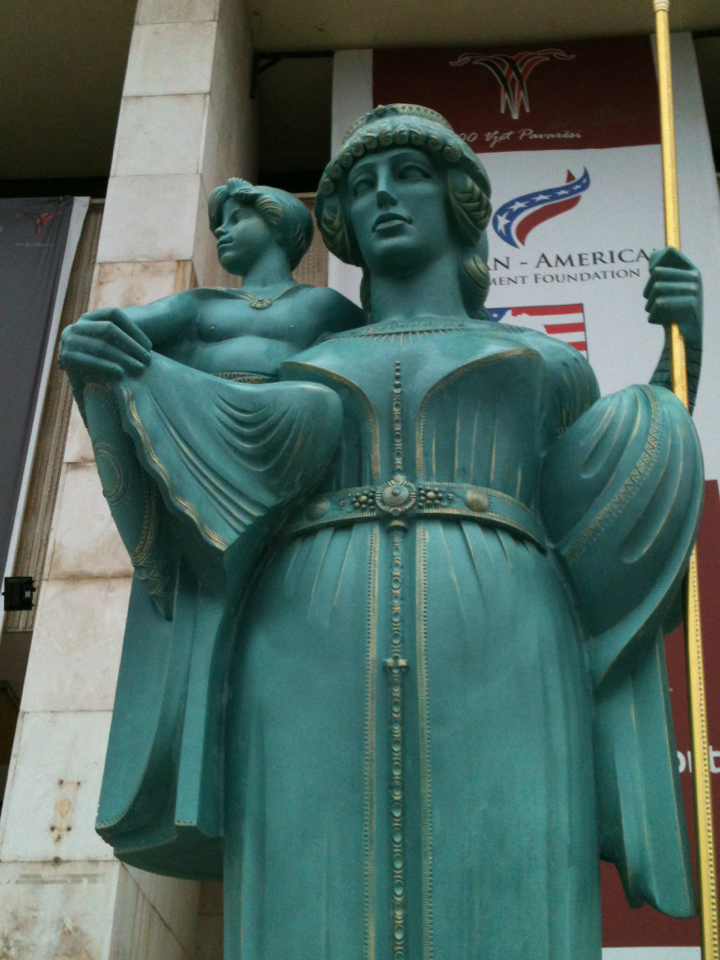
Modern statue of Illyrian queen Teuta of Illyria

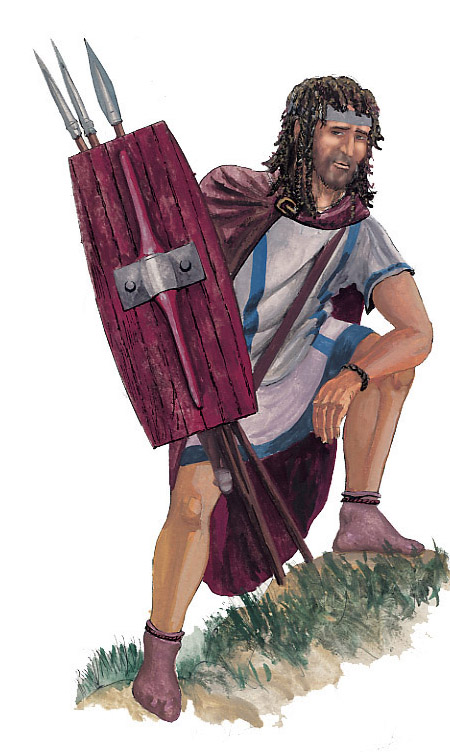
Modern drawing of a lightly equipped Illyrian

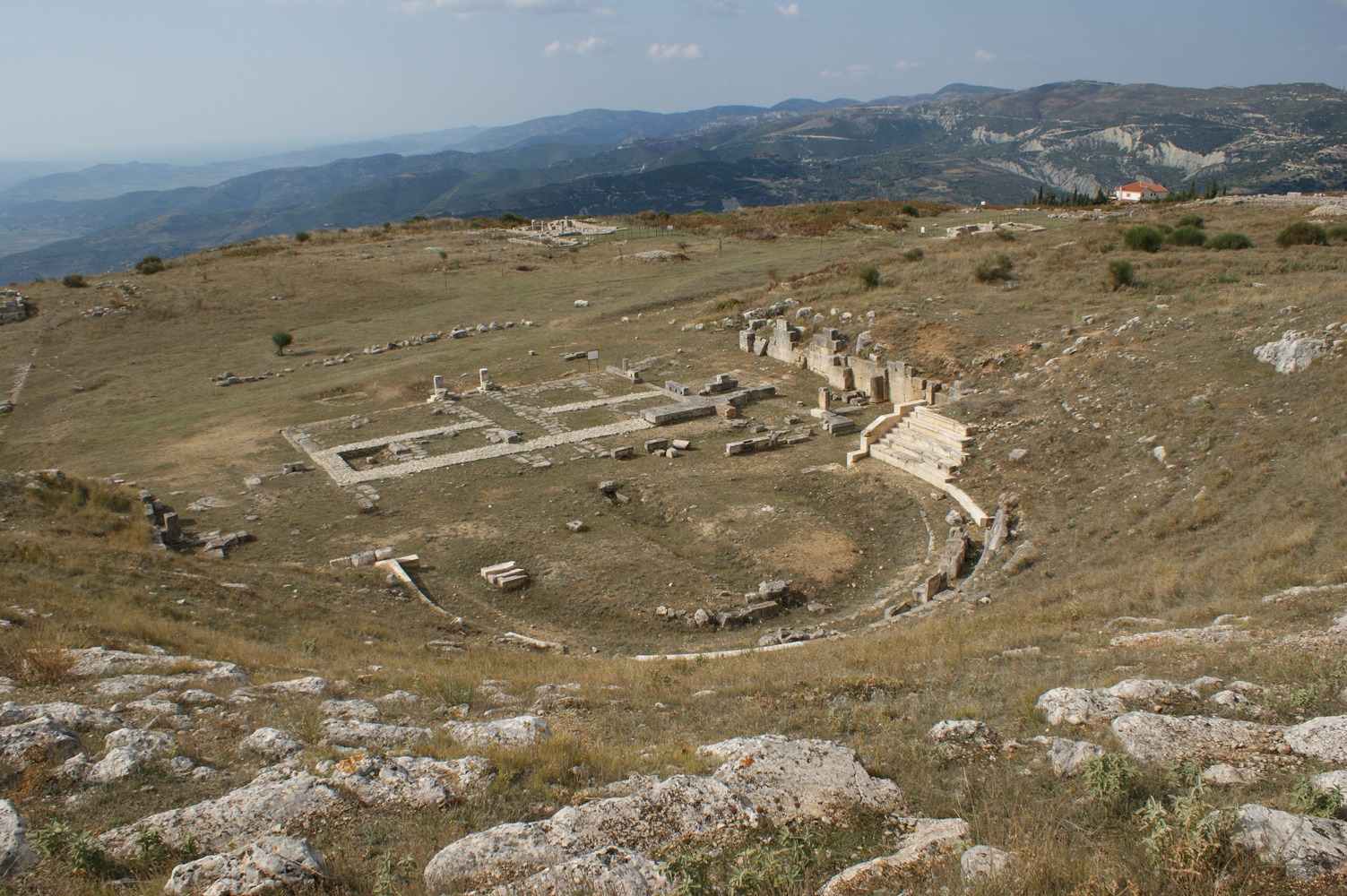
Byllis Theater

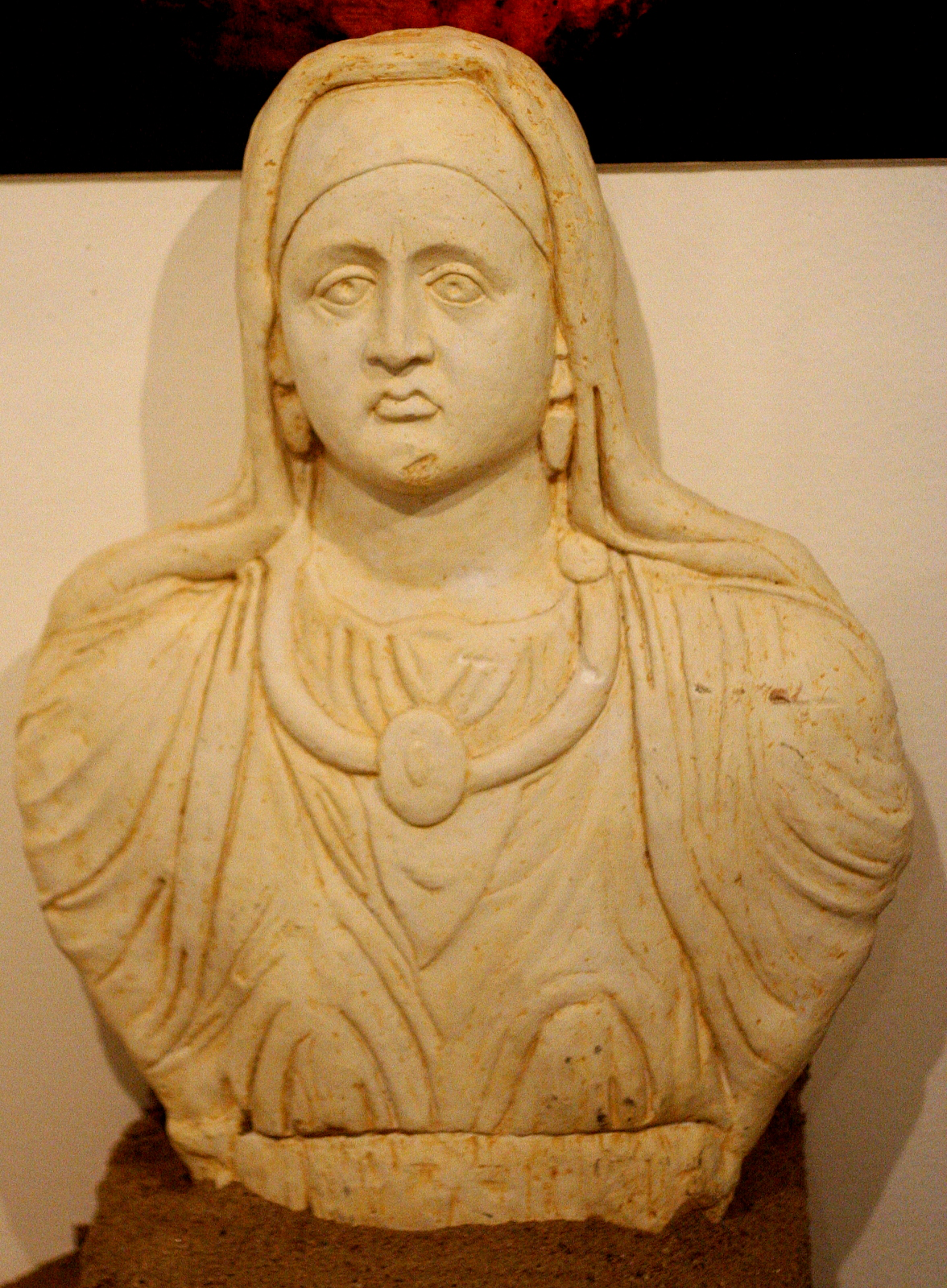
Dea Dardanica, a statue found in Kllokot - Kosovo.

Illyrian education is a term in the field of the history of education and pedagogical thought that denotes the totality of forms, organizations and educational institutions in the Illyria and among Illyrians. In the early periods, the education in Illyria and among the Illyrians was under the influence of Greek education, while later it was under the influence of Roman culture. Based on the latest scientific research and discoveries in various aspects of Illyrology: historical, archeological, epigraphic, linguistic, paleographic, etc. It has become possible to better summarize the Illyrian educational system. Illyrian education stretches over a period of time between the 8th century BCE, when the Illyrian culture began to flourish, and the 7th century CE, when the Illyrians are last mentioned in historical sources. In general, it can be said that education among the Illyrians was developed starting from a level of family and informal education towards an organized, institutional, and formal educational system.

== Ancient Illyrian education ==
To the Illyrians as well as to other ancient peoples, the main centers of organized activity became organized cities in the form of provincial communities known as koinons. Archaeological research proves the existence of the gymnasium in the Greek colony of Apollonia since the end of the 6th century BC. Later, gymnasiums and other educational institutions were opened in cities such as Amantia, Byllis, Durrës, Epidaurum, Nikaia, Historical evidence speaks of the Hellenistic School of Apollonia, in which in 44 Julius Caesar's nephew, Octavian Augustus, was also a student, probably because in this educational institution taught prominent scholars of the time. The school of Apollonia was a philosophical-rhetorical school in which students learned knowledge from fields such as philosophy, oratory (rhetoric), literature and language. The ancient Greek geographer and historian Strabo in his work Geographica describes it as "a city with good laws" (polis eunomotate). Even the Roman orator Cicero, who had visited these areas in 58 in his work Philipicae, described Apollonia as a "great and majestic city" (Latin: magna urbs et gravis) with a school of philosophy and oratory. The existence of libraries and stadiums has been proven in some Illyrian cities. In different historical periods, Greek and Roman educational institutions functioned in Illyria in which the children of the rich Illyrian strata attended classes.

Meanwhile, the great philosopher and teacher of ancient Greece, Aristotle, author of several writings dedicated to the Illyrians, among which the Constitution of Dyrrahium and the Constitution of the Mollosians are also spoken about the ancient city of Durrës. In his works Aristotle sometimes takes Durrës as an example of internal governance. While the poet Catullus called Durrës "the Adriatic tavern" (Latin: Adriae taberna), Cicero describes it as an "admirable city" (Latin: admirabilis urbs).

The functioning of a regular educational system helped in the development of higher forms of culture. The main cities never lacked stoas (promenades), which were public buildings for the development of political, literary and philosophical conversations. Thus, e.g. Byllis stoa, 144m long, was two-storey and with two crossings, separated by a colonnade, for the movement of citizens. Stoas (promenades) have also been discovered in Nikaia, Dimale etc. In the main cities there were also theaters, which were calculated not only for the population of the cities, but also of the villages. This is evidenced by the capacity of the Bylis theater with 7500 seats, at a time when the population of the city itself was 10-15 thousand inhabitants. It is understood that most of the spectators were from rural areas. The massive character of the participation shows at the same time that the performances were not intended for a cultured elite, who could follow the plays in the language of Aeschylus, Sophocles, and Euripides, but, in the local language, understandable to all. This is a proof of the existence of a dramatic literature in the Illyrian language. In general, the political, cultural and religious life in the Illyrian civic communities took place in gymnasiums, promenades, theaters, stadiums, temples, etc. In general, prominent scholars and personalities, distinguished military commanders and statesmen (kings) emerged from the Illyrian schools and educational system.

== Illyrian educational system ==
Family education

The education of children in the family was the first phase that includes the period from birth to the age of 7 years. During this period, the children of the Illyrians were educated in the family, by their parents and / or grandparents, but the mother (Illyrian woman) had a special educational role. It is known that the Illyrian woman in the family and in society enjoyed special respect. Ancient Greek and Roman authors, archaeological discoveries, and contemporary scholars confirm that women in the Illyrian world had more rights than ancient Greek or Roman women. Among other things, they enjoyed the right of inheritance, starting from the family to the highest governing bodies of the state. Such examples are Teuta, Beroea, Birkena, etc. According to Cicero, Illyrian women were "as powerful and industrious as their husbands, they guarded cattle, brought wood to their hearths, and prepared food. They breastfed their own children, even their twins." After this period the children of free citizens, of the middle and upper classes of Illyrian society continued their education in grammar schools.

Primary education

Primary or elementary schools were privately owned schools, in which Illyrian children aged 7-11 attended Greek schools. During this period, particular attention was paid to the teaching of literacy and counting. Small wooden boards painted with a layer of beeswax as well as pens, which were sharp metal or bone (pencil) tools in the shape of a pencil, were used as writing tools.

Palaestra

The Palaestra was the third phase of the educational system in which children from the age of 12-14 attended classes. Even these educational institutions were usually private and in Greek. During this period special attention was paid to the physical development of young people, mainly through gymnastic exercises and athletics. Their primary goal was to form a strong, stable, agile personality with a beautiful body.

Gymnasium

The gymnasium was the fourth phase of the educational system in which young people aged 15-17 attended classes. The education in the gymnasium was done in Greek under the care of the gymnasiarch, while special attention was paid to the physical, military and mental (intellectual) preparation of the young people, through running, jumping, javelin and discus, philosophical, literary and juridical-political conversations with learned people of time, etc.

Ephebos

Ephebos was the fifth stage when young people, usually men, attended school in Greek from the age of 18-20. During this period, the physical and military training of the youth continued, the first year under the direction of the gymnasium and the second year in the border units known as peripoles under the direction of the peripolarch. The main aim of this period was to prepare capable fighters for the defense of their city-state in case of need. Due to the importance of ephebos, the preparation of young people in this period took place under the direct care of the Illyrian state and civic communities.

== Illyrian educators ==
=== Cratillus, son of Machatas ===
Cratillus, son of Machatas was a gymnasiarch from the Illyrian city of Nikaia who lived in the 3rd century BC. His name is mentioned in an inscription found in the Illyrian castle of Klos in Mallakastër. The Illyrian city of Nikaia has been identified here, and during archaeological excavations, an inscription of the 3rd century BC was found and which mentions, besides the main officials of the city, the gymnasiarch named Cratillus, son of Machatas, in charge of education and physical-military training of the youth. To further prove this fact, a second-century inscription was found in the Greek city of Oropos, where a young man from the city of Nikaia was the first to be listed among the winners of the Amphiaraos festival. "It was also an honor for the city gymnasium, where the champion was prepared."

=== Mark Lugari ===
Mark Lugari was a teacher from the city of Apollonia who lived in the late 3rd and early 2nd century BC. During the archeological excavations in the tomb of the teacher Mark Lugari, the writing tools that were used by the students in the school at that time were discovered. On the belt of this teacher hung a leather holder, in the holes of which were inserted writing sheets of papyrus or parchment, collected in a cylindrical shape. At the end was a metal hook for catching squid and holding a pencil (pen). On his tombstone, the stonemason also carved a diptych (quadrangular writing board) there. In this way are given both ways in which it was written at that time. Both forms were expensive for beginners to use. Therefore the most practical were the wax-painted quadrangular tables where the letters were scratched with the tip of a pencil.

=== Nicetas of Remesiana ===
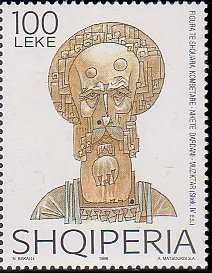
Nicetas of Remesiana (335 - 414) in a stamp from Albania - 1998

Nicetas (c. 335–414) was Bishop of Remesiana, (present-day Bela Palanka, Serbia), which was then in the Roman province of Dacia Mediterranea. According to reliable sources of archaeo-musicology, including those British, French and Italian, Nicetas has written, “I am Dardanian” (Latin: “Dardanus sum”).

Nicetas promoted Latin sacred music for use during the Eucharistic worship and reputedly composed a number of liturgical hymns, among which some twentieth-century scholars number the major Latin Christian hymn of praise, Te Deum, traditionally attributed to Ambrose and Augustine. He is presumed to be the missionary to the barbarian Thracian tribe of the Bessi.

Lengthy excerpts survive of his principal doctrinal work, Instructions for Candidates for Baptism, in six books. They show that he stressed the orthodox position in trinitarian doctrine. They contain the expression "communion of saints" about the belief in a mystical bond uniting both the living and the dead in a certain hope and love. No evidence survives of previous use of this expression, which has since played a central role in formulations of the Christian creed. His feast day as a saint is on 22 June.

=== Jerome of Stridon ===
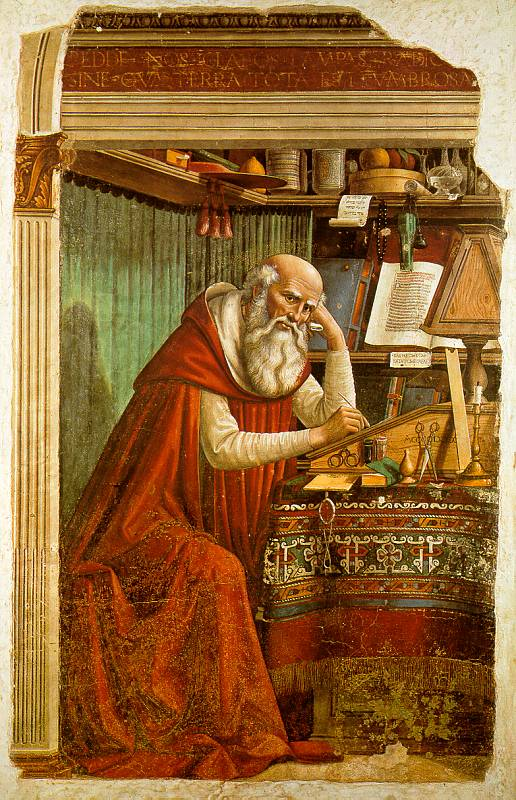
St. Jerome in His Study (1480), by Domenico Ghirlandaio

Jerome (/dʒəˈroʊm/; Latin: Eusebius Sophronius Hieronymus; Ancient Greek: Εὐσέβιος Σωφρόνιος Ἱερώνυμος; c. 342 – c. 347 – 30 September 420), also known as Jerome of Stridon, was a Christian priest, confessor, theologian, and historian; he is commonly known as Saint Jerome.

Jerome was born at Stridon (Illyricum), a village near Emona on the border of Dalmatia and Pannonia. He is best known for his translation of most of the Bible into Latin (the translation that became known as the Vulgate) and his commentaries on the whole Bible. Jerome attempted to create a translation of the Old Testament based on a Hebrew version, rather than the Septuagint, as Latin Bible translations used to be performed before him. His list of writings is extensive, and beside his Biblical works, he wrote polemical and historical essays, always from a theologian's perspective.

Jerome was known for his teachings on Christian moral life, especially to those living in cosmopolitan centers such as Rome. In many cases, he focused his attention on the lives of women and identified how a woman devoted to Jesus should live her life. This focus stemmed from his close patron relationships with several prominent female ascetics who were members of affluent senatorial families.

Due to Jerome's work, he is recognised as a saint and Doctor of the Church by the Catholic Church, and as a saint in the Eastern Orthodox Church, the Lutheran Church, and the Anglican Communion. His feast day is 30 September (Gregorian calendar).

Saint Hieronymus, also contributed in the field of education, pedagogy and culture. As a Christian scholar he detailed his pedagogy of girls in numerous letters throughout his life. He did not believe the body in need of training, and thus advocated for fasting and mortification to subdue the body. He only recommends the Bible as reading material, with limited exposure, and cautions against musical instruments. He advocates against letting girls interact with society, and of having "affections for one of her companions than for others." He does recommend teaching the alphabet by ivory blocks instead of memorization so "She will thus learn by playing." He is an advocate of positive reinforcement, stating "Do not chide her for the difficulty she may have in learning. On the contrary, encourage her by commendation..."

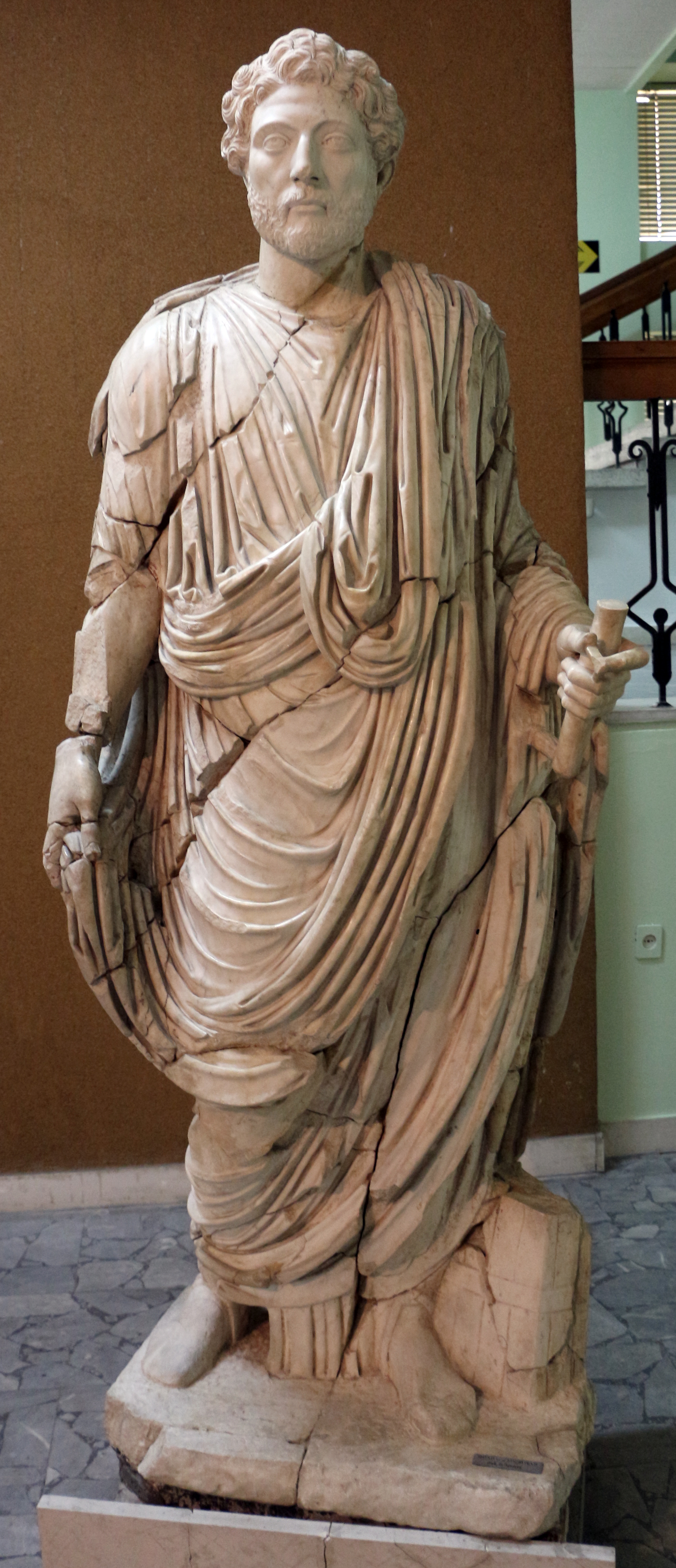
The Magistrate from Apollonia (Illyria)

== See also ==
- Illyrian kingdom
- Culture of ancient Illyria
- Education in ancient Rome
- Education in ancient Greece
- Ancient higher-learning institutions
