= Peucetian pottery =

Ancient pottery style indigenous to southern Italy

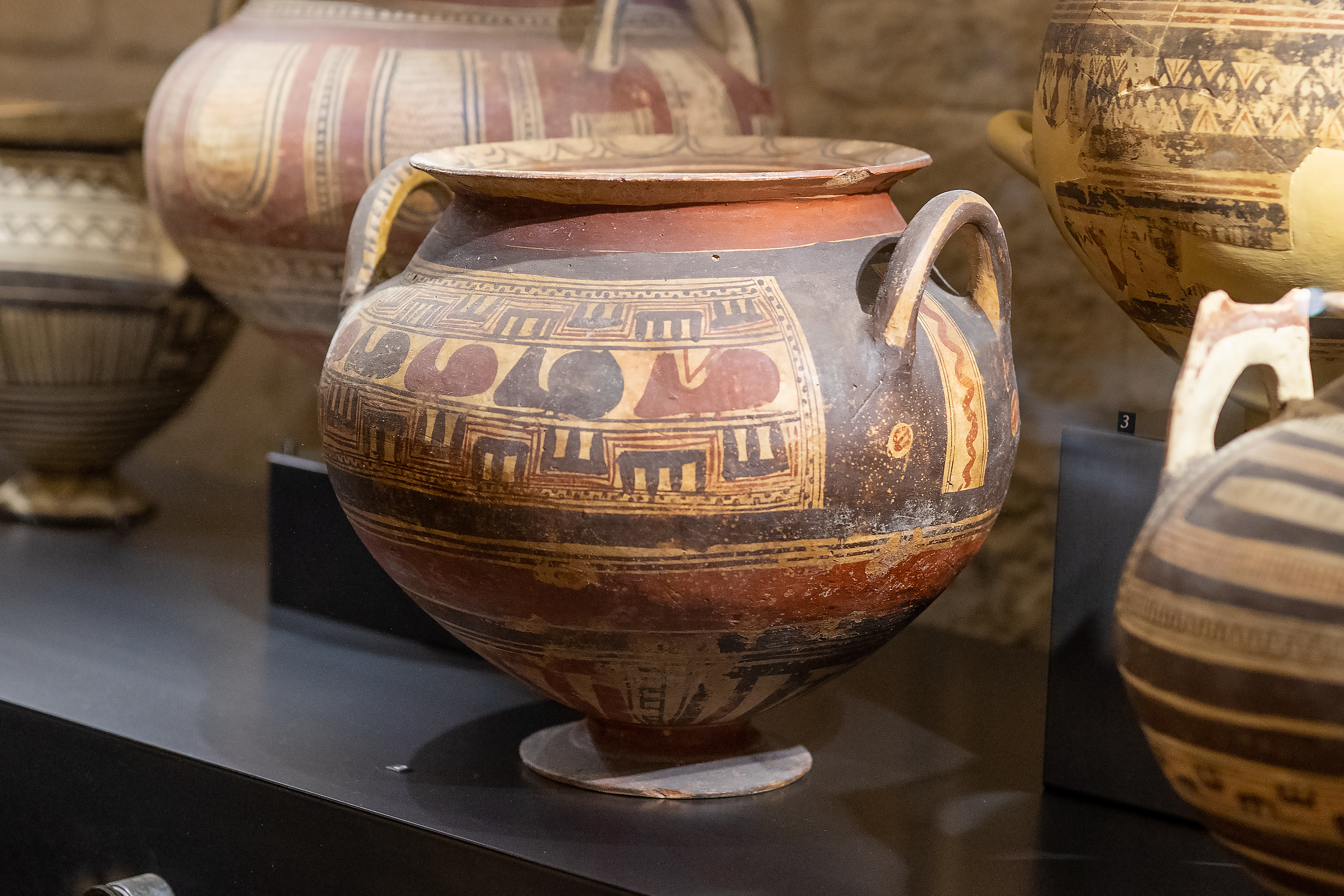
Peucetian olla with geometric decoration, 6th century BC. Museo Archeologico di Bari

Peucetian pottery was a type of pottery made in the Apulian region of southern Italy by the Peucetians from the beginning of the 7th to the 6th centuries BC. It is an indigenous type. Its production area occupied the space between Bari and Gnathia. The pottery was painted only in brown and black and was characterized by geometrical ornaments, swastikas, diamonds, and horizontal and vertical lines. These samples were mainly in the Late Geometric phase of ceramics (before 600 BC) with a close ornamental pattern. The second phase of the pottery since the 6th century BC is influenced strongly by the Corinthian vase painting. This is reflected both in the ornaments, decorations in the form of radiation, as well as a change to figurative representation. The third and final phase brings a shift in production methods. The pottery was hand-formed before the arrival of the Greeks in the southernmost tip of Italy, when the potter's wheel was introduced. The painting became purely ornamental. Shown on them are decorative plants like ivy and laurel vines and palmettes. Rare images included figurative and mythological figures.

== See also ==
- Daunian pottery
- Messapian pottery
