= Girolamo Colonna =

Italian Cardinal (1604–1666)

His Eminence Girolamo Colonna
- Archpriest of Saint John Lateran
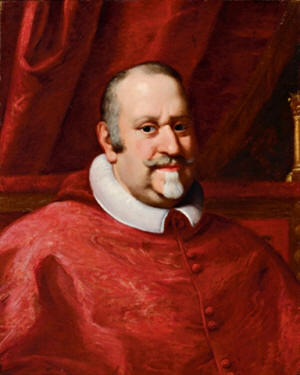
- Church: Roman Catholic
- Appointed: c. 1629
- Term ended: 4 September 1666
- Other post: Cardinal-Bishop of Frascati (1661–66)
- Previous post: Archbishop of Bologna (1632–45)

Orders
- Ordination: 27 December 1632 by Cristoforo Caetani
- Consecration: 2 January 1633 by Antonio Marcello Barberini
- Created cardinal: 30 August 1627 (In pectore) by Pope Urban VIII
- Rank: Cardinal-Bishop

Personal details
- Born: 23 March 1604 Orsogna
- Died: 4 September 1666 (aged 62) Finale Ligure
- Buried: Saint John Lateran, Rome
- Parents: Filippo Colonna, 6th Prince of Paliano; Lucrezia Tomacelli

Girolamo Colonna (23 March 1604 – 4 September 1666) was an Italian Cardinal of the Roman Catholic Church and member of the noble Colonna family.

== Biography ==
Colonna was born at Orsogna into the Colonna family and his extended family included members of various 17th-century Italian royal and noble houses. His father was Filippo I Colonna, Prince of Paliano and his mother was Lucrezia Tomacelli. His sister, Anna Colonna, married Taddeo Barberini, brother of cardinals Francesco Barberini and Antonio Barberini (Antonio the Younger).

Colonna was uncle to the children of his sister and brother-in-law, Maffeo Barberini, Cardinal Carlo Barberini and Lucrezia Barberini who married Francesco I d'Este, Duke of Modena.

He was elevated to cardinal on 30 August 1627 by Barberini Pope Urban VIII (the uncle of his brother-in-law Taddeo) at the insistence of his sister, Anna.

After the death of Pope Urban, he participated in the Papal conclave of 1644 that elected Pope Innocent X. He was Archpriest of the patriarchal Lateran basilica and Legate a latere for the opening and closing of the Holy Door in the patriarchal Lateran basilica in the Holy Year of 1650. He took part in the conclave of 1655 that elected Pope Alexander VII.

Pope Innocent X appointed him as Ambassador of the Holy See to Spain. He was called to Spain by King Philip IV and appointed as a counselor on state and military affairs. He celebrated the wedding between Emperor Leopold I and Infanta Margarita of Spain (daughter of Philip IV) and as legate accompanied her to Germany.

He was accompanied to Spain by Jules Mazarin (then 17 years old; later elevated to Cardinal himself). Mazarin later assisted Colonna's brother-in-law Taddeo and his brothers when they went into exile during the short schism between the Barberini and the Pamphili.

King Philip IV died in 1665 and Colonna assisted in the provision of last rites. At the death of the King, Colonna returned to his native Italy but died on 4 September 1666 at the Dominican convent in Finale Marina, near Genoa.

Letters from Milan and Genoa, dated 15 January 1667, verified the news. After six years, his remains were moved to Rome and buried in the chapel of his family in the patriarchal Lateran basilica.
