= Angelo Olivieri =

Angelo Olivieri (c. 1636 – June 20, 1715) was an Italian composer and priest.

== Biography ==
The son of Gaspare and Venanza Olivieri, Angelo Olivieri was born in Camerino in c. 1636. In 1647, he entered the service of Maffeo Barberini, Prince of Palestrina, and later served Maffeo's son, Urbano Barberini from 1685 onwards. He concurrently served cardinals Carlo Barberini (beginning in 1653) and Francesco Barberini (beginning in 1690). The Vatican Library contains nine secular cantatas composed by Olivieri between 1680-1682 as part of its Barberini collection.

During Lent of 1679, Olivieri's oratorio Innocentia in Joseph exaltata was performed at the San Marcello al Corso; a work he composed for the Archconfraternity of the Most Holy Crucifix (Arciconfraternità del SS Crocefisso). The music to this work is lost, but a libretto with the text dated March 17, 1679 survives. This libretto identifies Olivieri as a priest. On Christmas Eve 1680, Olivieri's cantata, La terra tributaria con le quattre stagioni al presepe di Nostro Signore, was performed at the Vatican. The cantata used words by Gaetano Monaci. The music to this work is also lost.

Oliveri composed the music to the comedic opera Dalla padella alla bragia which was created for the wedding of Gaetano Francesco Caetani, Duke of San Marco and Constanza Barberini. It was performed on January 20, 1681 at the Palazzo Barberini, and later repeated at the Collegio Clementino at the behest of Christina, Queen of Sweden. In 1684, the Congregazione dei Musici di Santa Cecilia (now the Accademia Nazionale di Santa Cecilia) commissioned Oliveri to compose a Te Deum in honor of new statuates created by Pope Innocent XI in relation to that institution. In 1702, he was commissioned to compose a Requiem mass commemorating James II of England (died 1701), which was performed at the San Lorenzo in Lucina.

Olivieri was collector of paintings by Giovanni Ventura Borghese; possessing 26 works by that artist. His art collection also included a portrait of one of his music students, the castrato Francesco de Castris.

Angelo Olivieri died in Rome on June 20, 1715.
