= Verospi =

Verospi is a surname. Notable people with the surname include:

- Fabrizio Verospi (1571–1639), Italian Catholic Cardinal
- Girolamo Verospi (1599–1652), Italian Catholic Cardinal
