= Anna Colonna =

Italian noblewoman (1601–1658)

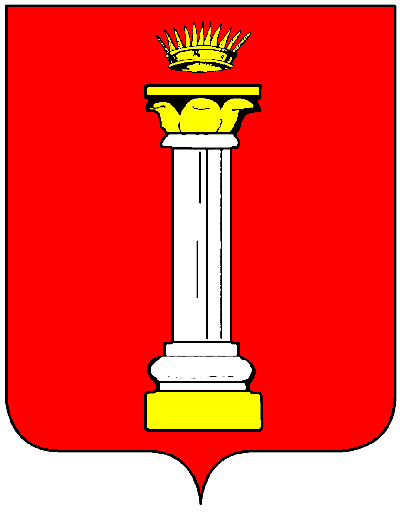
- Princess of Palestrina
- Successor: Olimpia Giustiniani; By marriage to her son Maffeo Barberini
- Other titles: Duchess of Monterotondo
- Born: 1601; Paliano
- Died: 1658 (aged 56–57); Rome
- Husband: Taddeo Barberini
- Father: Filippo I Colonna
- Mother: Lucrezia Tomacelli

Anna Colonna (1601–1658) was an Italian noblewoman of the Colonna, as daughter of the Prince of Paliano, and Barberini families. She was also the Princess of Palestrina and Duchess of Monterotondo.

== Early life ==
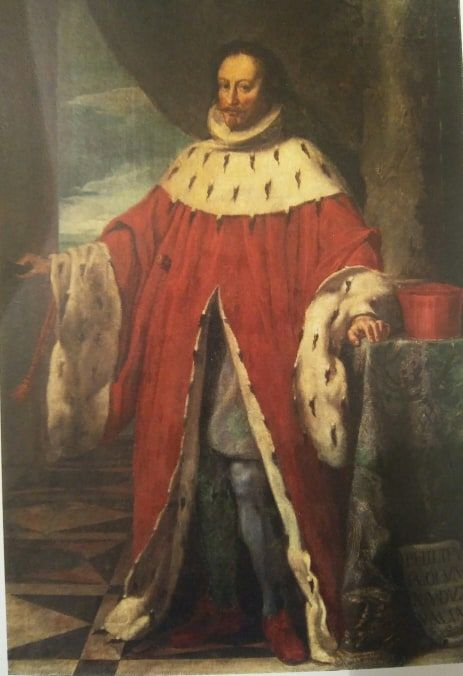
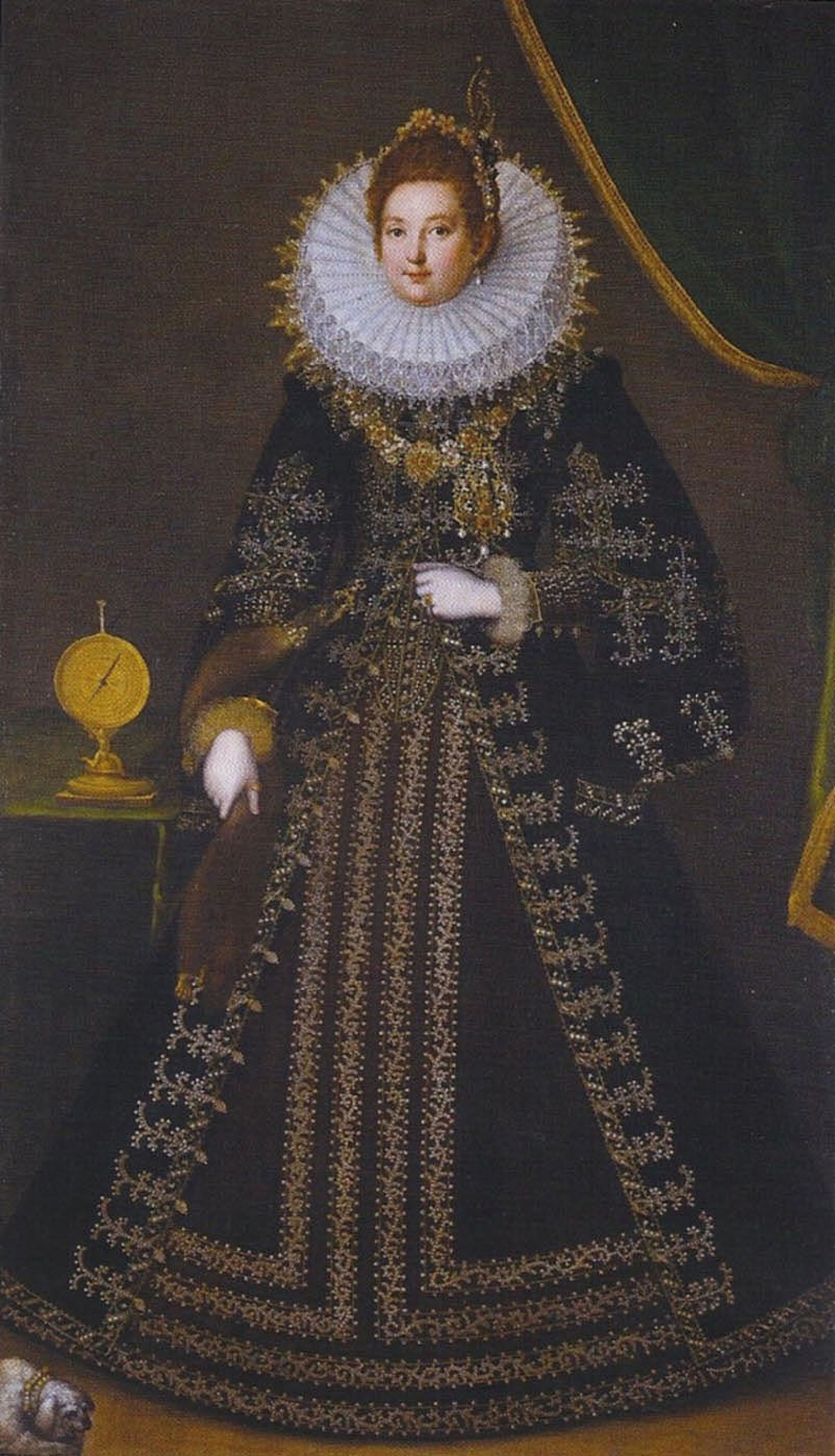

Colonna was born in 1601 at Orsogna; the daughter of Filippo Colonna, Prince of Paliano, and Lucrezia Tomacelli, of Galatro Her paternal grandparents were Carlo Colonna and Anna Borromeo and her maternal grandparents were Girolamo Tomacelli and Lucrezia Ruffo. Both the Tomacelli and Ruffo families were influential in Naples.

One of the members of Colonna's mother's entourage was the poet Francesca Turina Bufalini, the grandmother of Cardinal Mazarin. Bufalini would compose several poems in honor of both Anna and her mother and might also have been a tutor of Anna.

After the death of Anna's mother in 1622 when Colonna twenty-one and her sister was two, they were sent to live and be educated at the convent of San Gisueppe dei Ruffi. The convent had been founded by Anna's maternal grandmother Ippolita Ruffo and her aunt Caterina Tomacelli. who was prioress of the convent during her nieces stay there.

Sometime around 1623 it was rumored that a betrothal was underway for one the Colonna sisters with the proposed groom being Taddeo Barberini, the nephew of the new Pope Urban VIII. Though the Barberini had come into prominence and power they were regarded as upstarts lacking a sufficient noble background. This hoped to amend by marrying the youngest Barberini brother into the ancient Roman nobility. (The Colonna family could trace their descent back to the 11th century.)

Barberini was also at the time in discussion to marry Anna Carafa, a significant heiress and a distant relative of Colonna. Barberinis brother, Cardinal Francesco Barberini visited the convent in 1627 in order to ascertain the demeanour and health of the three sisters. In the end Colonna was chosen as an acceptable bride for his brother.

Colonna having spent about four years in the convent resigning herself to not marrying and devoting herself to a pious life, left the convent the same year (1627) to prepare for her marriage.

After her departure her younger sister Ippolita Maria formally joined the convent.

== Marriage ==
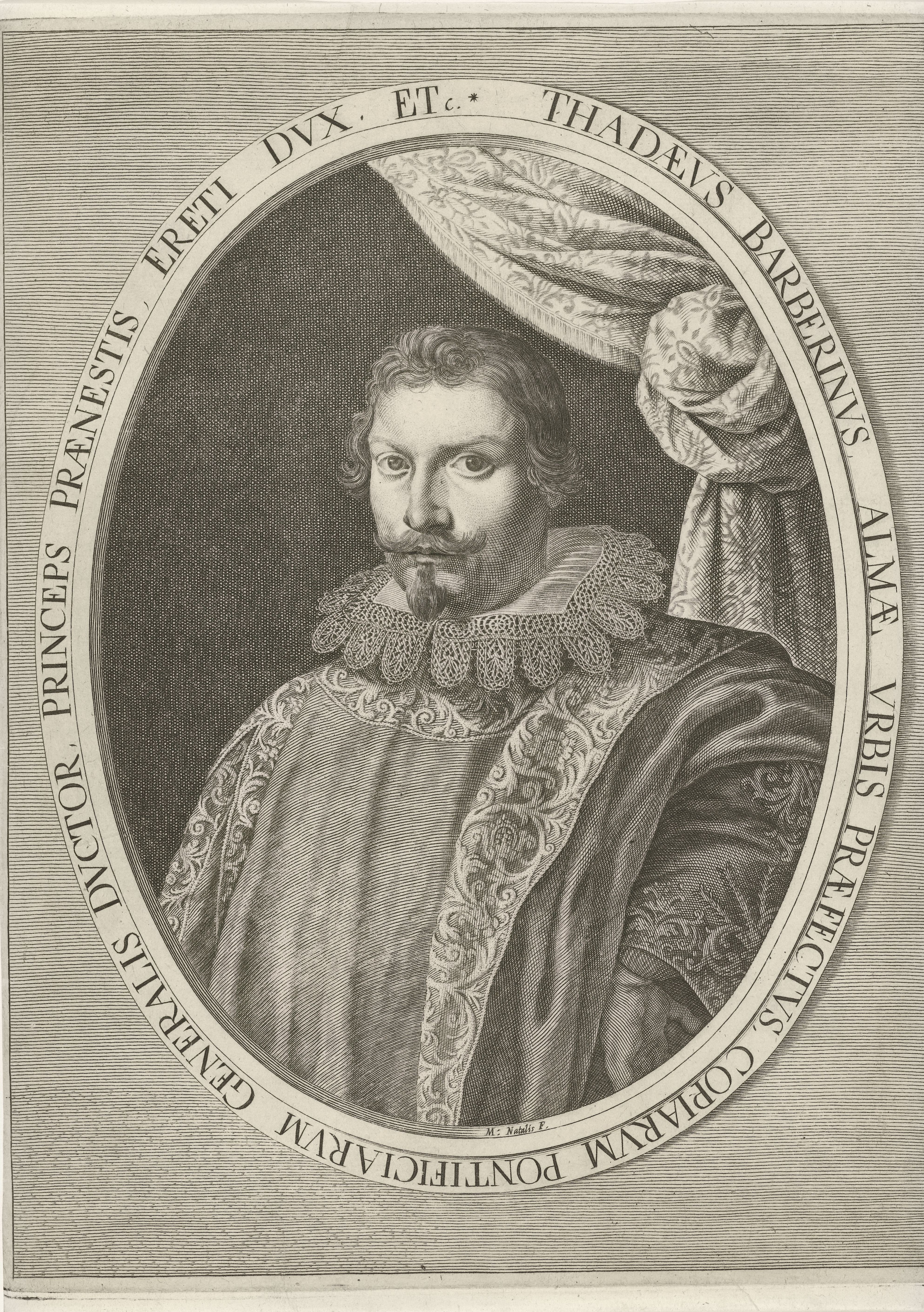
Taddeo Barberini

On 14 October 1627, at age 26, she married Taddeo Barberini, Prince of Palestrina (later Prefect of Rome) who was two years her junior. The marriage was celebrated by Barberini's uncle, Pope Urban VIII at Castel Gandolfo. At the castle, a coat of arms was erected which merged the heraldic bees of the Barberini with the single column of the Colonna.

Colonna and her husband had great affectation for each other which also extended to their children, whose well-being Colonna informed her husband about in great detail in their correspondence. Colonna showed great care for her children, even sleeping by their beds in a makeshift cot when they were ill. Colonna was very devout and saw things like the death of one of her children's nurse-maids as a divine punishment.

For the first few years of their marriage the couple lived at the Palazzo Barberini, with Colonna and her husband inhabiting one wing, while her brother-in-law Antonio lived in the other, but Colonna found the air in the building unhealthy and believed that inhaling this "bad air" was the reason for her having given birth to only daughters.

The couple therefore moved to the older residence Palazzo Barberini ai Giubbonari, where their first son Francesco would be born.

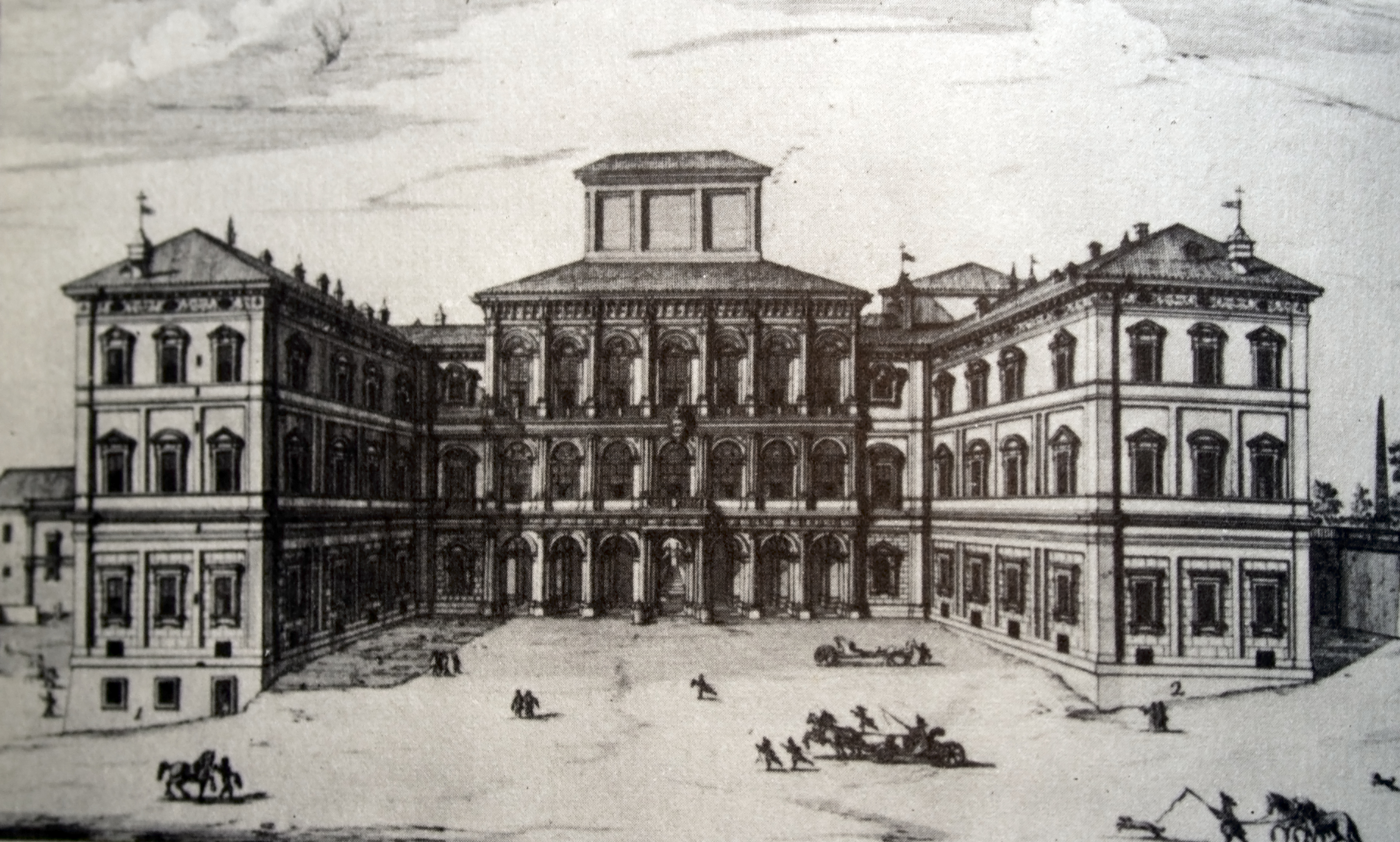
Palazzo Barberini "alle quattro fontane" (c. 1699)

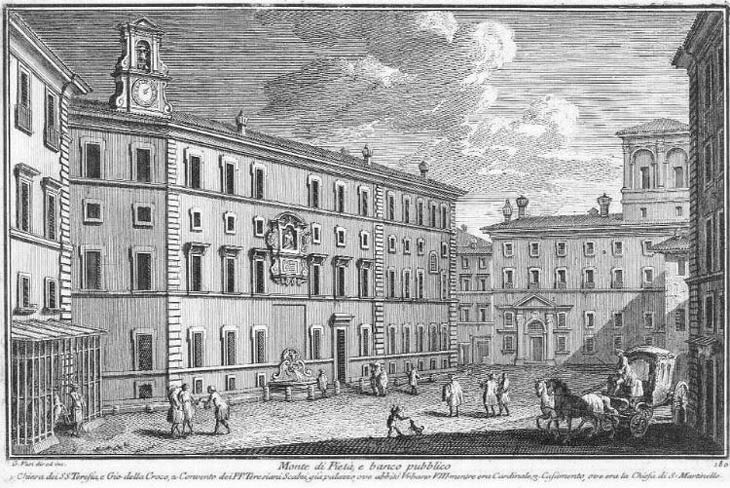
18th century depiction of the Palazzo Barberini ai Gubbionai by Giuseppe Vasi (1748)

== Rome ==
As the wife of the secular patriarch of the Pope's family in Rome, Colonna became one of the most powerful women in the city and in the surrounding Papal States. This is reflected in the personal wealth she and Barberini amassed during Urban's reign; a pontificate known for its Anna m. Halso er status was also made clear by the manner in which she was treated by her peers. In 1634, when crowds were assembled for a tournament at the Piazza Navona, her place is described in the following terms:

On one side was a third row for the noblest of ladies; and here, occupying the post of
honour, was the box of the Donna Anna Colonna and the Donna Costanza Barberini.

The event was held in honour of the 1634 visit to Rome of Prince Alexander Charles Vasa of Poland and the Piazza was decorated with tapestries of gold and silver. Colonna distributed diamonds and other prizes to winning tournament entrants.

Botanist Giovanni Baptista Ferrari spent a significant amount of time working in the gardens established by Colonna's brother-in-law, Cardinal Francesco Barberini. The second edition of his botany reference book, De Florum Cultura, was dedicated to Colonna in 1638. Colonna was also a patron of botanical artist, Giovanna Garzoni.

=== Religious patronage ===
Colonna would remain very religious throughout her life and donated regularly to religious charities..

Colonna had as a spiritual advisor the Oratorian priest Giovanni Tomaso Eustachio In 1638, Colonna requested the relics of the Oratorian founder Philip Neri and commissioned the sculptor Alessandro Algardi to design gold and silver reliquaries to house them. The caretakers of Neris remains hid it, but since Colonna was the wife of the Pope's nephew her demand was acceded to, and she was given one of Neris ribs.

Colonna also commissioned paintings such as a depiction of Sant'Alessio from Pietro da Cortona titled "The Death of Saint Alexius"

== Barberini exile ==
After the death of Pope Urban VIII, newly elected Pamphili Pope Innocent X launched an investigation into the Barberini's handling of funds during the Wars of Castro. Colonna's husband, Taddeo, and his brothers, cardinals Francesco Barberini and Antonio Barberini went into exile in Paris with the support of Cardinal Jules Mazarin. Mazarin was the uncle of Marie Mancini; wife of Colonna's nephew Lorenzo Onofrio Colonna and a confidant of Colonna's brother, Cardinal Girolamo Colonna. Mazarin had also served as infantry captain under Colonna's father, Filippo Colonna.

Colonna who had remained in Rome in order to protect the possessions of the family made a passionate appeal (in person) to the Pope, urging him not to strip the Barberini of their assets. The Pope agreed and, though he paid some debts out of the Barberini estate, left the Barberini alone.

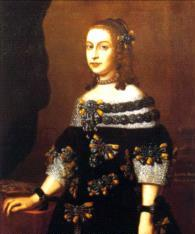
Portrait of Lucrezia Barberini by Carlo Cittadini

Colonna joined her husband and children in Paris in 1646, but upon arrival Colonna discovered that her only surviving daughter, Lucrezia had been placed in a convent. Despite Colonna stating that she wanted to have her daughter living with her, her daughter was to remain in the convent.

While in Paris, Colonna had developed a close friendship with Anne of Austria, Regent of France (widow of King Louis XIII). Colonna's husband died in 1647 from phthisis, Anne urged Colonna to stay in France but Colonna chose return to Rome.

== Return to Rome ==
In 1653, with the assistance of Olimpia Maidalchini (who was keen to curry favour with Colonna's cardinal brothers-in-law), she arranged the marriage of her 22-year-old son Maffeo Barberini to Maidalchini's 12-year-old granddaughter (Pope Innocent's grand-niece), Olimpia Giustiniani. The marriage resolved many problems at once, reconciling the Barberini and Pamphili families; allowing the remaining Barberini exiles to return to Rome and ensuring the continuation of the Barberini family line.

Having returned to Rome, Colonna also planned to build a convent and chapel in honour of the Blessed Virgin Mary, Regina Coeli. To fund the project she appealed to her eldest son, Cardinal Carlo Barberini, for access to part her dowry, which had been substantial and had included the comune of Palestrina, which provided a substantive basis for the hereditary Barberini principality. However, her son declined her request and she was forced to seek funds from her brother, Girolamo. The project was indeed eventually completed; she was buried in the church (demolished 1881) of that name in Trastevere, Rome.In 1653, Lucrezia's brother was married to Pope Innocent's grand-niece, Olimpia Giustiniani. The marriage resolved many problems at once, reconciling the Barberini and Pamphili families; allowing the remaining Barberini exiles to return to Rome.

Now restored to favor, Colonna also wanted to arrange her daughter Lucrezia's marriage, a matter which she expected to have a say in, but was told by her brother-in-law Cardinal Antonio Barberini that she would have no say in whom her daughter married. Her mother dejected then retired to Regina Coeli, where she would have the company of her sister Vittoria who had been made prioress of the convent.

Soon after this Lucrezia was married to the twice widowed Francesco I d´Este, Duke of Modena.

== Death ==
Colonna died in 1658 and was buried at the grounds of the convent.

== Family ==
Colonna and Barberini had five children:

- Lucrezia Barberini (1628–1699) who married Francesco I d'Este and became Duchess of Modena.
- Camilla Barberini (1629–1631) who died in infancy
- Carlo Barberini (1630–1704) who became a Cardinal
- Maffeo Barberini (1631–1685) future Prince of Palestrina
- Niccolò Maria Barberini (1635–1699) became a Carmelite monk
