= Fabrizio Verospi =

Italian Catholic Cardinal and curial judicial official

Fabrizio Verospi (1571 – 27 January 1639) was an Italian Catholic Cardinal and a curial judicial official.

== Early life ==
Verospi was born in 1571 in Rome, the son of Girolamo Verospi and his wife Penelope Gabrielli and the uncle of Girolamo Verospi who was later also elevated to Cardinal.

He studied law in Rome and Perugia and then at the University of Bologna where he earned a doctorate in utroque iure. He was subsequently employed as a domestic prelate, auditor of Fermo and, in 1595, referendary of the Tribunals of the Apostolic Signature of Justice and of Grace. In 1597 he was appointed governor of Cesena and then of Fermo.

== Ecclesiastic career ==
In 1611 Verospi became a cleric of the Apostolic Chamber and auditor of the Sacred Roman Rota. The latter role he held for 16 years and gained a reputation for expert legal opinion, detailed and lengthy judgements and an adherence to precedent.

In 1619 he was appointed nuncio extraordinary to Vienna and soon after was responsible for the arrest of Cardinal Melchior Klesl who had refused to act against Protestants after the Bohemian Revolt. He was again named nuncio extraordinary to Vienna in 1622 to act as a witness to the marriage of Emperor Ferdinand II and Princess Eleonora Gonzaga. At the same time, he oversaw the transfer of Cardinal Klesl to Rome.

From 1623 to 1627 Verospi served as Governor of Perugia and Umbria. Verospi grew close to Carlo Barberini, brother of the new Pope Urban VIII (elected in 1623). The family later entrusted Verospi to negotiate the October 1627 marriage of Carlo's son Taddeo Barberini to Anna Colonna which he concluded to the satisfaction of all involved.

== Cardinalate ==
In the midst of productive marriage negotiations, Verospi was elevated to cardinal on 30 August 1627 and was appointed cardinal-priest of San Lorenzo in Panisperna. In 1633 he transferred to the church of Santa Maria della Pace.

Verospi died on 27 January 1639 and he was buried in his family tomb in the church of the Santissima Trinità dei Monti.
