= Olimpia Giustiniani =

Italian noblewoman (1641–1729)

Giustiniani, Olimpia
- Born: 18 May 1641
- Died: 27 December 1729 (aged 88)
- Known for: Italian noblewoman

Olimpia Giustiniani (18 May 1641 – 27 December 1729) was an Italian noblewoman of the houses of Giustiniani and Barberini. She was the granddaughter of Olimpia Maidalchini, grand-niece of Pope Innocent X and wife of Maffeo Barberini, Prince of Palestrina.

== Biography ==
Giustiniani was born on 18 May 18, 1641 at the Palazzo Pamphili to Andrea Giustiniani and Anna Maria Flaminia Pamphili, of the powerful Giustiniani and Pamphili families.

Her great-uncle, Pope Innocent X (Giovanni Battista Pamphili of the Pamphili family), was the brother-in-law of her maternal grandmother, papal power-broker Olimpia Maidalchini.

=== Marriage ===
Olimpia Giustiniani was married in 1653 to Maffeo Barberini, son of Taddeo Barberini (who died in exile in Paris), future Prince of Palestrina and heir to the Barberini estate.

The marriage, which reconciled the Barberini and Pamphili families, was engineered by Guistiniani's maternal grandmother, Olimpia Maidalchini, and Barberini's uncle, Cardinal Antonio Barberini, several years after the Barberini were forced into exile by an investigation instigated by Pope Innocent X following the Wars of Castro. Maidalchini, realizing her influence over Pope Innocent was waning, arranged the marriage to facilitate a return of the Barberini to Rome in order to curry favor with a number of the Barberini family's cardinals. The Barberini, too, were keen to return to Rome and were enthusiastic about Maidalchini's plan to marry Pope Innocent's grand-niece, Guistiniani, into their family.

Despite the fact that 12-year-old Guistiniani stubbornly refused to marry her 22-year-old suitor, surprising few, the two were married at a lavish ceremony celebrated by Pope Innocent himself. After the ceremony, however, the child refused to go home with her new groom to allow the marriage to be consummated. Her mother, who had barely been involved in her upbringing, appealed to her by telling her that other girls were forced to marry decrepit old men and that, by comparison, Barberini was a far better option. When the child still refused, Maidalchini forced her granddaughter into a carriage that took her to the Palazzo Barberini and a new life as a daughter of the Barberini.

By marriage, Olimpia became sister-in-law to both Cardinal Carlo Barberini and Lucrezia Barberini, who subsequently married Francesco I d'Este, Duke of Modena.

=== Issue ===
Maffeo Barberini and Olimpia Giustiniani had five children:

- Costanza Barberini (1655–1687), married duke Francesco Caetani of Caserta in 1680
- Camilla Barberini (1657–1740), married count Carlo Borromeo-Arese in 1689
- Francesco Barberini (1662–1738), cardinal from 1690
- Urbano Barberini (1664–1722), who would inherit the titles of his father in 1685
- Taddeo Barberini (1666–1702), married Maria Teresa Muti in 1701 but died childless.
