= Urbano Barberini (1664–1722) =

Italian nobleman (1664-1722)

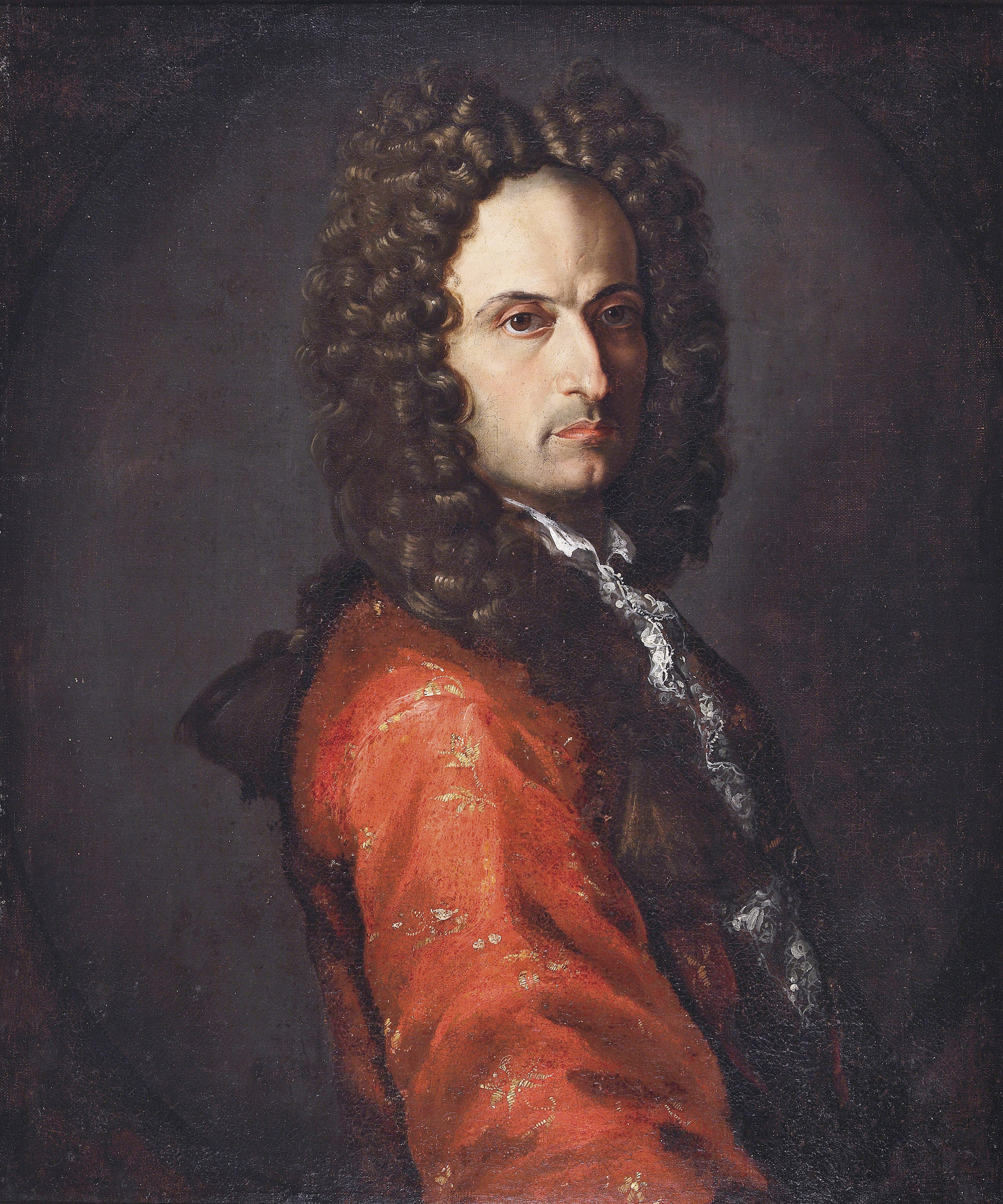
Urbano Barberini, Prince of Palestrina by Jacob Ferdinand Voet.

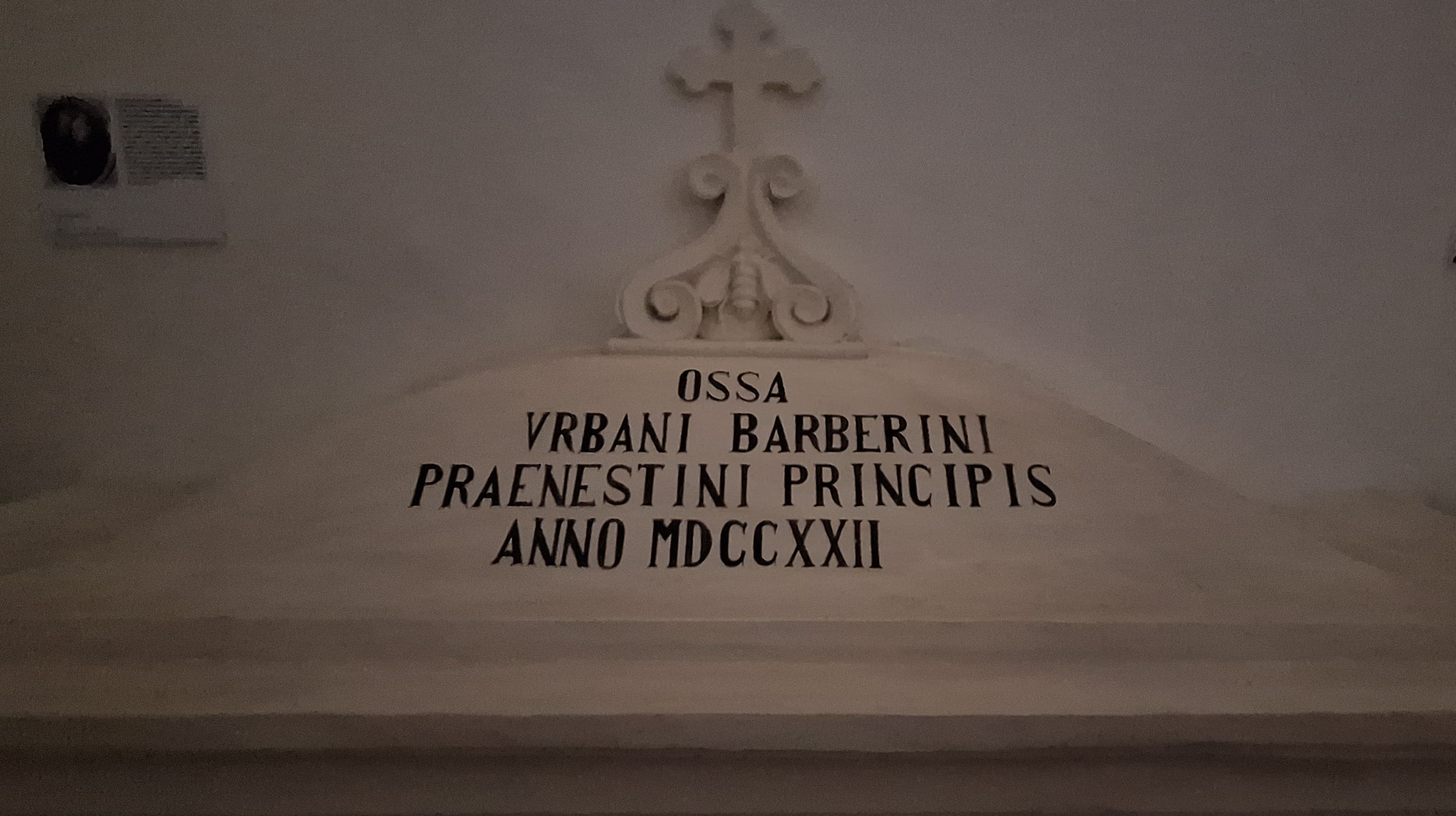
Tomb of Urbano Barberini

Urbano Barberini (1664 – 27 September 1722) was an Italian nobleman of the House of Barberini, third hereditary Prince of Palestrina and last legitimate male heir of the Barberini line. His great-granduncle was Pope Urban VIII.

== Biography ==
Urbano Barberini was born in Rome, the son of Maffeo Barberini and wife Olimpia Giustiniani, whose marriage had reconciled the Barberini with the papacy after the Wars of Castro and falling out with Pope Innocent X. His elder brother was Cardinal Francesco Barberini (Junior). Urbano was a cousin of Rinaldo d'Este, Duke of Modena whose mother, Lucrezia Barberini, was Urbano's aunt.

At his father's death in 1685 he inherited the Barberini comune of Palestrina and became the 3rd Barberini Prince of Palestrina. He also inherited a number of artworks including Caravaggio's The Cardsharps, Parmigianino's "The Madonna and Child with the Young Saint John the Baptist and Mary Magdalene", (c. 1535–40), and "The Madonna and Child with Saint Martina", (c. 1645) by Pietro da Cortona. Like his father, he was made a Knight of the Order of the Golden Fleece (in 1687). In November 1691, he attended a concert at Santa Maria della Vittoria commemorating the Battle of Lepanto.

In the summer of 1706, Urbano made an unsuccessful attempt to prevent his second wife from taking refuge in a convent. In January 1708, he made plans to remove her by force. The plan was discovered and the monastery secured with a large guard. When word reached Pope Clement XI, he ordered Urbano banished from the ecclesiastical states. Cardinal Barberini managed to have this modified to an exile from Rome. Urbano then went to Lucca.

The legitimate male Barberini line became extinct at Urbano's death in 1722. Due to his gambling and dissolute spending, he left a good deal of debt to be managed by Cardinal Barberini, now head of the family. The Barberini name and title's were transferred to Giulio Cesare of the House of Colonna di Sciarra who married Urbano's daughter and heir, Cornelia Constance Barberini.

== Marriages ==
Barberini was married three times.

=== Cornelia Zeno Ottoboni ===
In 1691 he married Cornelia Zeno Ottoboni (sister of Cardinal Pietro Ottoboni). Her last will and testament gives some idea of the wealth the Barberini had amassed under Urbano's grandfather, Taddeo Barberini and his brothers who had all benefited from their uncle Pope Urban VIII's famous nepotism.

=== Felice Ventimiglia Pignatelli d'Aragona ===
In 1693 he married Felice Ventimiglia Pignatelli d'Aragona. It was an unhappy marriage for both parties. Though they had a son, a much-awaited legitimate heir for the Barberini house, he died at the age of three. The two separated and she sought refuge with her brother-in-law, Urbano's Cardinal brother Francesco and later joined a convent within his bishopric. Her dowry, later her legacy upon her death, was left to Francesco. Neither she nor Urbano made mention of each other in their respective wills.

=== Maria Teresa Boncompagni ===
In 1714, now 50 years old and still without a legitimate male heir, Barberini married 22-year-old Donna Maria Teresa Boncompagni (daughter of Gregorio II Boncompagni, Duke of Sora, and wife Ippolita Ludovisi). They had one daughter, Cornelia Costanza Barberini. When she was 12 years old, Urbano's brother Francesco encouraged her to marry Giulio Cesare Colonna di Sciarra. Maria Teresa wanted her daughter to remain with her at the Palazzo Barberini until she was of an age to choose her husband. Cardinal Francesco, in an effort to maintain to Barbarini heritage, wanted his niece to be educated at a convent of his choosing until she was old enough to marry a husband, also of his choosing. Eventually Cornelia Constance Barberini, Urbano Barberini's only legitimate heir, married Giulio Cesare Colonna di Sciarra, giving origin to the Barberini-Colonna di Sciarra, Princes of Carbognano, Dukes of Bassanello, Montelibretti and Anticoli Corrado, etc, and the Barberini-Colonna, Princes of Palestrina, Dukes of Castel Vecchio, etc, families.

== Maffeo Callisto Barberini ==
Though none of his wives bore him a legitimate male heir, there are many mentions of an illegitimate male heir to the House of Barberini, Maffeo Callisto Barberini. Born in 1688, his birth predates any of Barberini's marriages.

The will of Urbano Barberini's last wife, Maria Teresa Boncompagni, makes mention of this Maffeo Callisto as the Marquis of Corese and she expresses "appreciation and gratitude" for him. A large portion of the Barberini estate was left for him in her will.

Later her progeny came into conflict with him over claims to the Barberini estate but the quarrel was settled with an agreement signed in Paris in 1811 which divided the estate between the two claimant branches of the family.
