= Girolamo Verospi =

Italian Catholic Cardinal

Girolamo Verospi (1599 – 5 January 1652) was an Italian Catholic Cardinal.

== Biography ==
Verospi was born in 1599 in Rome; the son of Ferdinando Verospi and Giulia de' Massimi and the nephew of Cardinal Fabrizio Verospi. At a young age he became an advocate of causes to the Roman Curia and auditor of the Sacred Roman Rota in 1627.

He was elevated to cardinal by Pope Urban VIII in 1641 and was made Cardinal-Priest of Sant'Agnese in Agone the following year. At the same time he was appointed Bishop of Osimo. He was consecrated at the Sistine Chapel by Cardinal Antonio Marcello Barberini.

Verospi participated in the Papal conclave of 1644 which elected Pope Innocent X.

Verospi died on 5 January 1652 at Osimo and news of his death reached Rome two days later.

Catholic Church titles
Preceded by Agostino Galamini	Bishop of Osimo; 1642–1652	Succeeded by Lodovico Betti
Preceded by Girolamo Colonna	Cardinal-Priest of Sant'Agnese in Agone; 1642–1652	Succeeded by Baccio Aldobrandini
