= Giovanni Ventura Borghese =

Italian painter

Giovanni Ventura Borghese (died 1708) was an Italian Baroque painter. Born in Città di Castello, he was a pupil of Pietro da Cortona. He assisted Cortona in Rome, and completed some of his paintings after Cortona's death. He painted an Annunciation and a Virgin Mary crowned by Angels for the church of San Niccoló da Tolentino in Rome. He also painted scenes from the life of St. Catherine for the church of Città di Castello. The Italian composer Angelo Olivieri was a collector of his works; having amassed 26 of Borghese's painting by the time he died in 1715.
