= Barberini family =

Italian noble family

Barberini
- Barberini coat of arms.
- Country: Italy
- Founded: Between 1530 and 1559
- Founder: Antonio Barberini (1494–1559)
- Titles: Pope (non-hereditary); Prince of Palestrina; Prince of Valmontone; Duke of Monterotondo
- Estate: Palestrina

The House of Barberini is a family of the Italian nobility that rose to prominence in the 17th century Rome. Their influence peaked with the election of Cardinal Maffeo Barberini to the papal throne in 1623, as Pope Urban VIII. Their urban palace, the Palazzo Barberini, completed in 1633 by Bernini, today houses Italy's Galleria Nazionale d'Arte Antica (National Gallery of Ancient Art).

== Early history ==
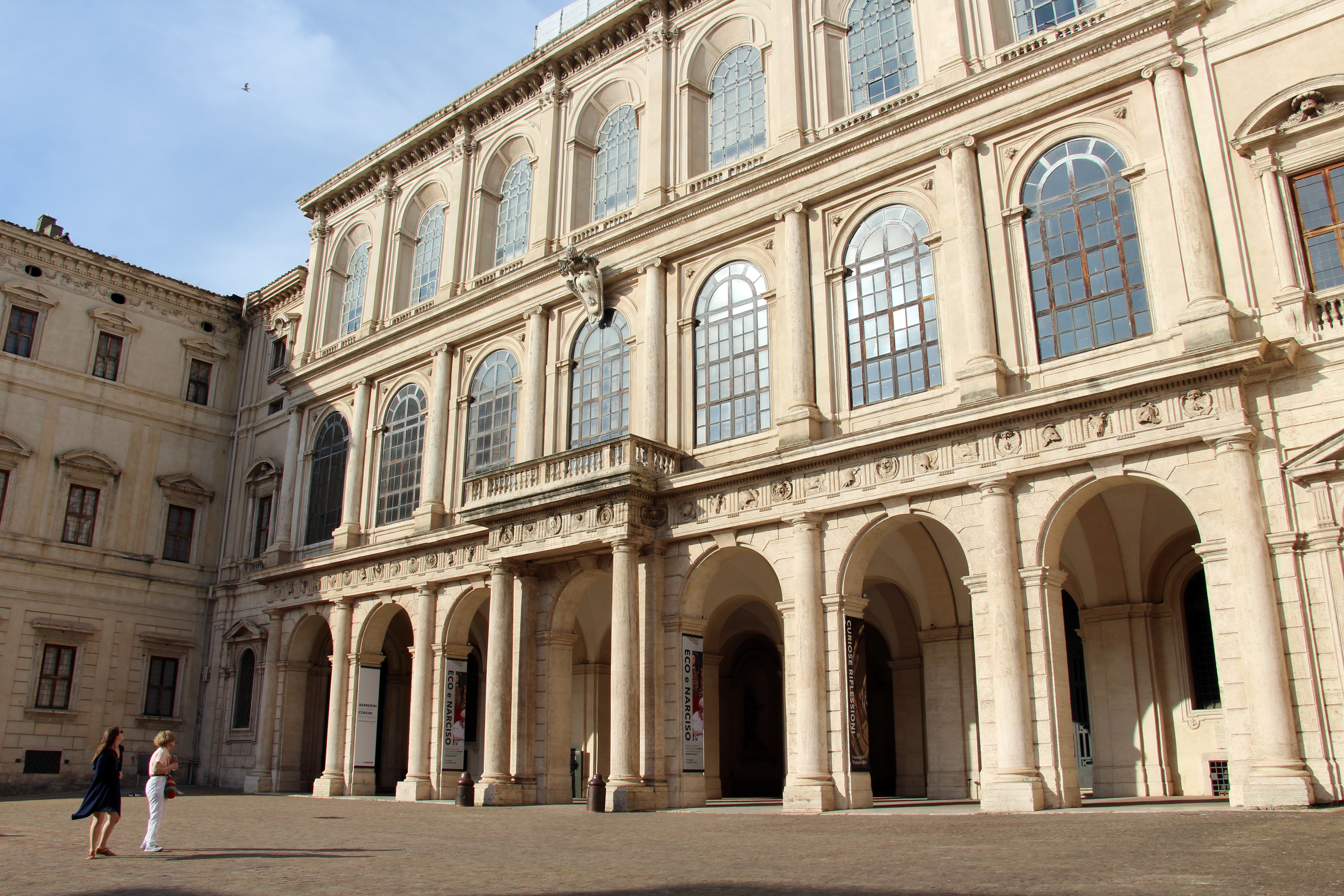
Palazzo Barberini, Rome, next to the Piazza Barberini in Rione Trevi

The Barberini family was originally a family of minor nobility from the Tuscan town of Barberino Val d'Elsa, who settled in Florence during the early part of the 11th century.

Carlo Barberini (1488–1566) and his brother Antonio Barberini (1494–1559) were successful Florentine grain, wool and textile merchants. In 1530 Antonio participated in the defense of the Florentine Republic but after the capture of the city by Imperial troops, and the return to power of the Medici, Antonio grew weary of Medici rule and left Florence in 1537 to oversee Barberini business in Rome.

In 1552, Carlo's son Francesco followed his uncle to Rome and business flourished. Francesco became a very rich man and bought several high offices within government and the Catholic Church. In 1559, his uncle Antonio was murdered by forces loyal to the Medici.

Francesco continued to build his fortune and amass titles until he died in 1600. Ordinarily, his estate would have been "fined" by the Camera Apostolica for operating a business while holding church office but his relatives successfully appealed to the head of the organization Francesco had, himself, once directed. The continuation of Barberini's business fell to his nephews (the sons of his brother, Antonio Barberini, who had died in 1571) including Maffeo Barberini.

== Maffeo Barberini as Pope Urban VIII ==
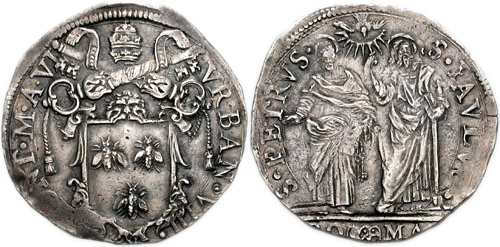
Barberini coat-of-arms (three bees) surmounted by papal tiara and crossed keys on a coin struck for Pope Urban VIII.

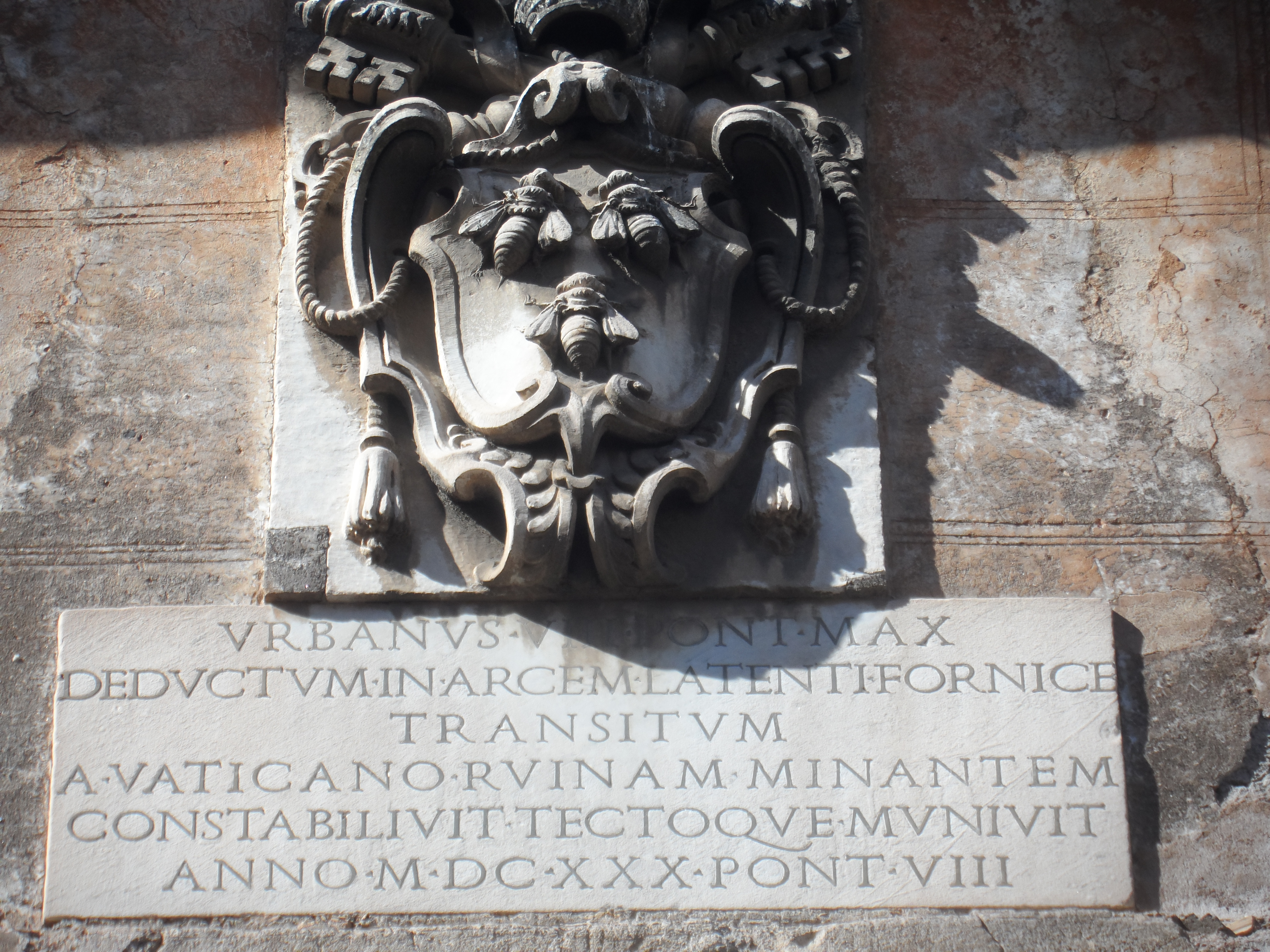
Barberini arms in Rome on a plaque commemorating Urban VIII.

The Barberini acquired great wealth and influence when Cardinal Maffeo Barberini was elected to the papal throne in 1623, taking the name Pope Urban VIII. He elevated a brother Antonio Marcello Barberini (Antonio the Elder) and two nephews, Francesco Barberini and Antonio Barberini, to the cardinalate. He made another brother Duke of Monterotondo, and gave a third nephew, Taddeo Barberini, the principality of Palestrina. Taddeo was also made Gonfalonier of the Church, Prefect of Rome and Commander of Sant'Angelo.

The ecclesiastical, diplomatic, and cultural accomplishments of Urban's reign were overshadowed by the nepotism the pope practised. Urban's contemporary, John Bargrave, wrote:

Upon his elevation, his kindred flew from Florence to Rome like so many bees (which are the Barberini's arms), to suck the honey of the Church, which they did excessively.

Likewise, the War of Castro, toward the end of Urban's papacy, sullied Urban's reputation and the popularity of those family members who survived him. It is estimated that during Urban's reign, the Barberini amassed 105 million scudi in personal wealth.

When the pope removed the ancient bronze beams from the portico of the Pantheon to procure bronze for St. Peter's Baldachin of St. Peter's Basilica and for the papal cannon foundry, an anonymous critic punningly wrote:

Quod non fecerunt barbari, fecerunt Barberini

This translates to "What the barbarians did not do, the Barberini did". The pope erected a tablet proudly proclaiming his re-use of these hidden beams for the glory and defense of the church.

== Wars of Castro, exile and restoration ==
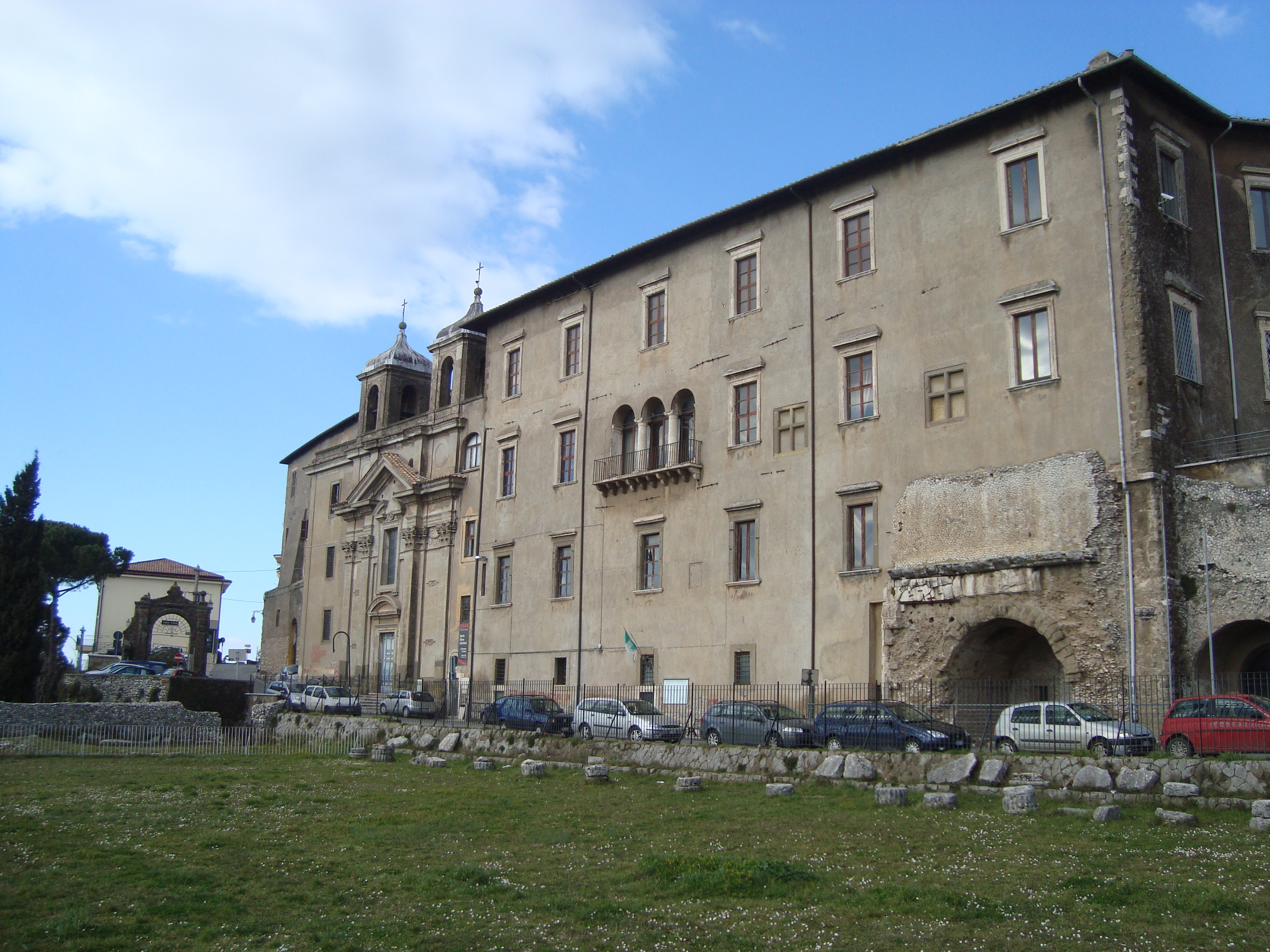
The Palazzo Colonna Barberini in Palestrina; the comune over which various Barberini family members were given control.

The Barberini participated extensively in the First War of Castro. The conflict began when Odoardo Farnese, Duke of Parma and Piacenza, visited Rome and insulted the pope's nephews by suggesting the brothers were too young to manage the Pope's affairs. The war produced no clear victor, and Pope Urban died in 1644, only months after a peace accord was signed.

Despite Urban's appointment of several relatives as cardinals, the College of Cardinals elected Pope Innocent X of the Pamphili family. Almost immediately, Innocent X launched an investigation into the conduct of various members of the Barberini family during the wars.

The three nephews who had risen to prominence under their uncle Pope Urban VIII, cardinals Antonio and Francesco and Prince Taddeo were forced into exile and fled to Paris under the protection of Cardinal Mazarin. Antonio and Taddeo left first, by sea, but not before hanging the French coat of arms above the door of the Palazzo Barberini to confirm they were under the protection of France. Francesco joined his brothers soon after.

Taddeo's wife, Anna Colonna also joined her husband and children in Paris but not before making a passionate appeal (in person) to the Pope, urging him not to strip the Barberini of their assets. The Pope agreed and, though he paid some debts out of the Barberini estate, left the Barberini alone.

In Paris, they relied on the hospitality of Louis XIV, King of France, until 1653 when most of the family finally returned to Rome. Though Taddeo died in exile in 1647, his brothers eventually reconciled with the papacy through the marriage of Taddeo's younger son Maffeo with Olimpia Giustiniani, a niece of Pope Innocent. Maffeo was given his father's former title, that of Prince of Palestrina.

Taddeo's older son Carlo Barberini was made a cardinal by Pope Innocent X. Taddeo's daughter, Lucrezia Barberini, married Francesco I d'Este, Duke of Modena (who had previously sided with the Farnese during the First War of Castro), further stabilizing relations.

== Later history ==
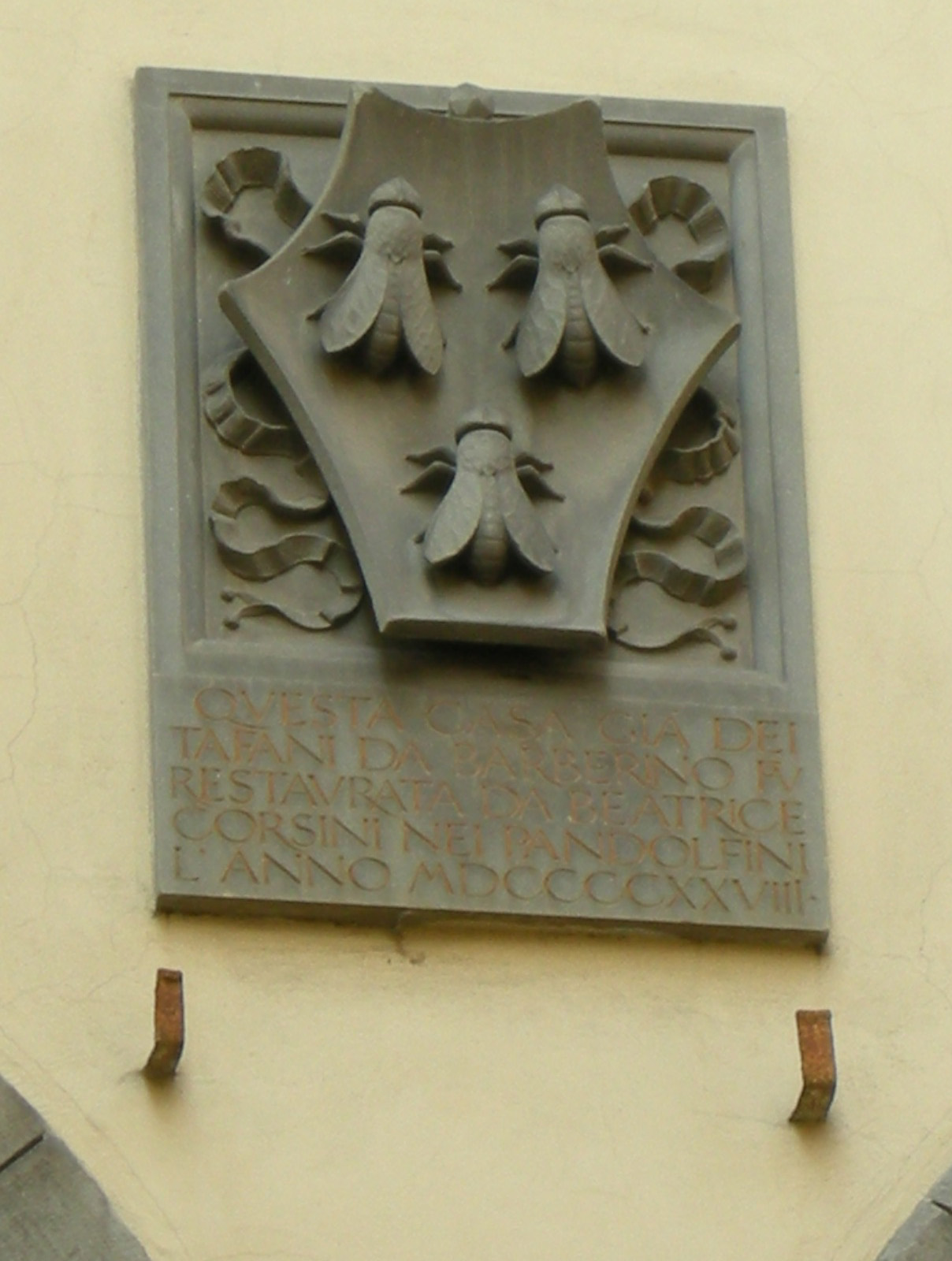
Family coat-of-arms at the Palazzo Barberini.

The 1627 marriage of Taddeo Barberini and Anna Colonna, daughter of Filippo I Colonna began the century-long process which would eventually see the Barberini merge with the Colonna family.

In 1728, the Carbognano branch (Colonna di Sciarra) of the Colonna family added the name Barberini to its family name when Giulio Cesare Colonna di Sciarra married Cornelia Barberini, daughter of Urbano Barberini, the last legitimate male Barberini heir. Palestrina had been a fiefdom of the Colonna di Sciarra (between the 11th century and 1630, with the princely title after 1571) before passing to the Barberini.

Though Urbano's wives bore him no legitimate male heirs, Urbano fathered a son, Maffeo Callisto Barberini in 1688 before any one of his three marriages. The will of Urbano Barberini's last wife, Maria Teresa Boncompagni, makes mention of this Maffeo Callisto as the Marquis of Corese. A large portion of the Barberini estate was left for him in her will.

Later her progeny came into conflict with his over claims to the Barberini estate but the quarrel was settled with an agreement signed in Paris in 1811 which divided the estate between the two claimant branches of the family (the Barberini Colonna di Sciarra and the Barberini of Palestrina).

The Colonna line became extinct again on the death of Prince Enrico Barberini-Colonna and the name went to his daughter and heiress Maria and her husband Marquis Luigi Sacchetti, who received the title of Prince of Palestrina and permission to use the Barberini name.

On 21 June 2005, Augusto Barberini, the 13th Prince of Palestrina, died in Rome. The family is now represented by Benedetto Francesco Barberini, Prince of Palestrina (born 1961), whose heir is his eldest son.

The head of the Barberini Colonna branch (now Barberini Colonna Riario) is currently Prince Urbano Barberini, a famous Italian actor.

== Patrons of the arts ==
The Palazzo Barberini, the Barberini library (now a core section of the Vatican's Biblioteca Apostolica), and the many buildings, altars, and other projects spread across Rome (and marked with the heraldic three bees) give evidence of the family's wealth, taste and magnificence in the seventeenth century. The family commissioned many artists, such as Lorenzo Ottoni, to undertake various Barberini-centric projects. The family were also important early patrons of opera, maintaining "star" singers like Marc'Antonio Pasqualini on payroll, and building the private Teatro delle Quattro Fontane. Many objects from the Barberini art collections are scattered in museums around the world including:

- The Barberini Faun and Barberini Apollo, sold to Ludwig I of Bavaria and now in the Munich Glyptothek
- The Barberini Venus
- The Barberini Hera, also seen in this head;
- The Portland Vase (once known as the Barberini Vase), bought from the family by Sir William Hamilton and now in the British Museum
- The Allegory of Divine Providence and Barberini Power
- The Anglo-Saxon Barberini Gospels, in the Vatican Library, with many other manuscripts from the Barberini collections
- The Barberini Codex, or Libellus de Medicinalibus Indorum Herbis, an Aztec herbal manuscript now once again in Mexico.

A nucleus remains in the hands of the family, as well as in the Galleria Nazionale d'Arte Antica, which occupies part of the Palazzo Barberini in Rome. The cultural influence of the dynasty was considerable, and provided the subject for a major international conference in December 2004 (and subsequent publication), entitled I Barberini e la Cultura Europea.

== Barberini family tree ==
Family tree of the 16th and 17th century Barberini (hereditary patriarchy of the family is indicated by the colored squares).

Carlo Barberini (born 1488)	Cassandra del Branca	Antonio Barberini (born 1494)
Francesco Barberini	Antonio Barberini	Camilla Barbadori
Carlo Barberini	Costanza Magalotti	Alessandro Barberini	Niccolo Barberini	Pope Urban VIII	Antonio Marcello Barberini
Francesco Barberini (senior)	Camilla Barberini	Maria Barberini	Taddeo Barberini	Anna Colonna	Clarice Barberini	Antonio Barberini
Francesco I d'Este	Lucrezia Barberini	Carlo Barberini	Maffeo Barberini	Olimpia Giustiniani (Pamphili)
Rinaldo d'Este	Costanza Barberini	Camilla Barberini	Francesco Barberini (junior)	Urbano Barberini (1664–1722)	Taddeo Barberini

== Lineage ==
- Antonio Barberini (c. 1529–1571) ∞ Camilla Barbadori
  - Carlo Barberini (1562–1630) ∞ Costanza Magalotti
    - Francesco Barberini (1597–1679)
    - Taddeo Barberini (1603–1647) ∞ Anna Colonna (1601–1658)
      - Lucrezia Barberini (1628–1699) ∞ Francesco I d'Este (1610–1658)
      - Carlo Barberini (1630–1704)
      - Maffeo Barberini (1631–1685) ∞ Olimpia Giustiniani (1641–1729)
        - Francesco Barberini (1662–1738)
        - Urbano Barberini (1664–1722)
          - Cornelia Costanza Barberini (1716–1797) ∞ Giulio Cesare Colonna di Sciarra, V principe di Carbognano (1705–1787)
    - Antonio Barberini (1607–1671)
  - Maffeo Barberini (1568–1644)
  - Antonio Marcello Barberini (1569–1646)

== See also ==
- The Allegory of Divine Providence and Barberini Power
- Ferrante Pallavicino – satirical critic of the Barberini.
- Palazzo Barberini ai Giubbonari
