= Carlo Barberini (1562–1630) =

Italian nobleman

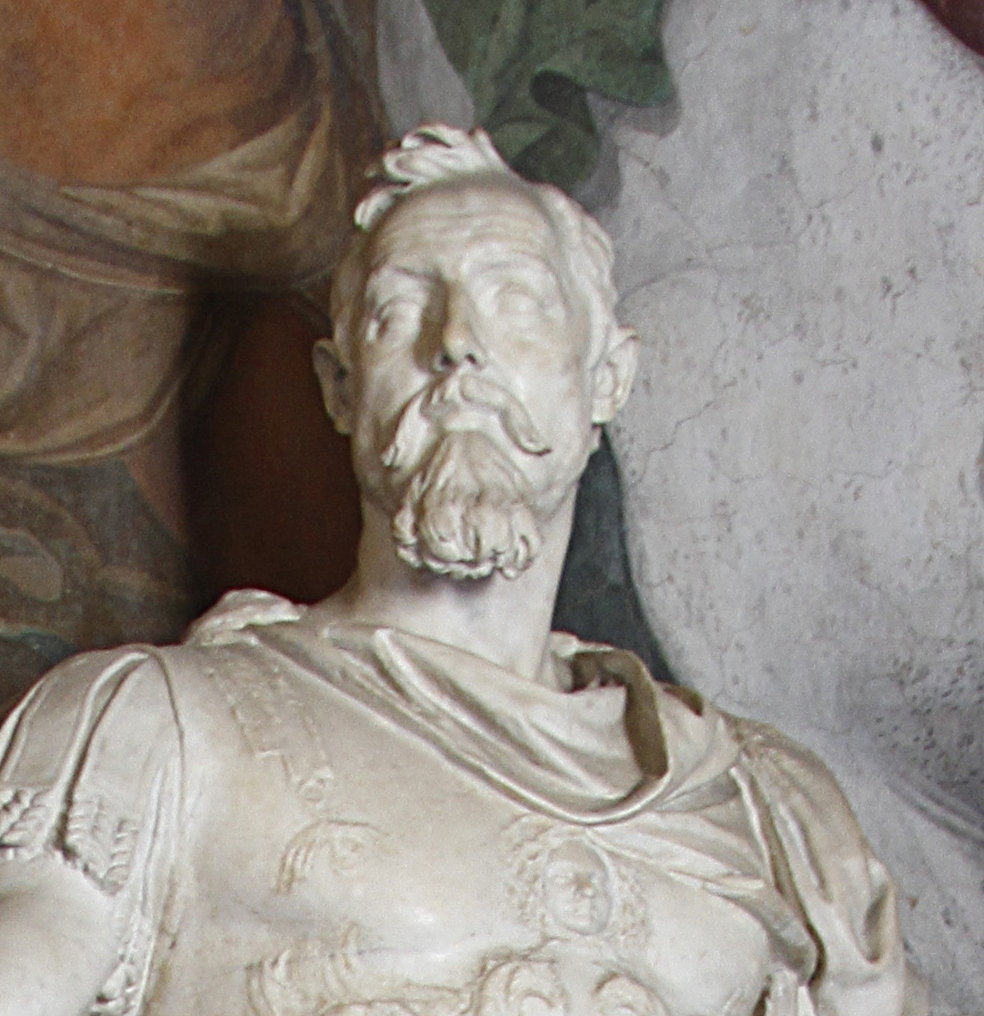
- Statue of Carlo Barberini in the Musei Capitolini in Rome
- Born: 28 May 1562
- Died: 26 February 1630 (aged 67)
- Noble family: Barberini
- Spouse: Costanza Magalotti
- Father: Antonio Barberini
- Mother: Camilla Barbadori

Carlo Barberini, Duke of Monterotondo, (28 May 1562 – 26 February 1630) was an Italian nobleman of the Barberini family and lieutenant general of the papal army. He was the brother of Maffeo Barberini, who was elected to the papal throne as Pope Urban VIII.

Carlo Barberini was the son of Antonio Barberini and Camilla Barbadori. As their eldest son he became patriarch of the Barberini family.

In 1594, he married Costanza Magalotti (1575–1644), daughter of Vincenzo Magalotti and Clarice Capponi and sister of Lorenzo Magalotti.

They had six children including Taddeo Barberini, Francesco Barberini and Antonio Barberini (Antonio the Younger). When Barberini's brother was elected to the papal throne as Pope Urban VIII, Francesco and Antonio were both elevated to Cardinal. Taddeo was given the title of Prince of Palestrina, later passed on to successive Barberini patriarchs.

Barberini did not escape his brother's famous nepotism; he was appointed Gonfalonier of the Church and Duke of Monterotondo, a commune Barberini later bought.

In 1626, he published a treatise concerning the disciplinary and administrative reorganization of the Papal army. He also left an unpublished synopsis on The Prince by Niccolò Machiavelli.

After Barberinis death his widow Costanza and their two daughters Camilla and Clarice entered the convent Santissima Incarnazione del Verbo Divino in Rome.

== Issue ==
Clarice became a nun under the name Maria Grazia in Santissima Incarnazione del Verbo Divino

Francesco

Maria married Tolomeo Duglioli

Taddeo

Camilla, became a nun under the name Innocenza in Santissima Incarnazione del Verbo Divino

Antonio

== See also ==
- Gonfalone of the Church
- Monterotondo
- Barberini
