= Pamphili family =

Italian noble family

Pamphili Pamphilj
- Papal noble family
- Coat of arms of the House of Pamphili
- Country: Papal States; Kingdom of Italy; Italy
- Founded: 9th century
- Founder: Amanzio
- Final ruler: Girolamo Pamphili, 4th prince of San Martino al Cimino and Valmontone
- Historic seat: Palazzo Pamphilj
- Titles: List of titles: Pope (non-hereditary); Cardinal (non-hereditary); Prince of San Martino al Cimino; Prince of Valmontone; Prince of Lugnano; Prince of Montelanico; Duke of Carpineto; Imperial Count
- Motto: Tanto Alto Quanto Se Puote (As high as possible)
- Dissolution: 1760
- Cadet branches: Doria-Pamphili-Landi

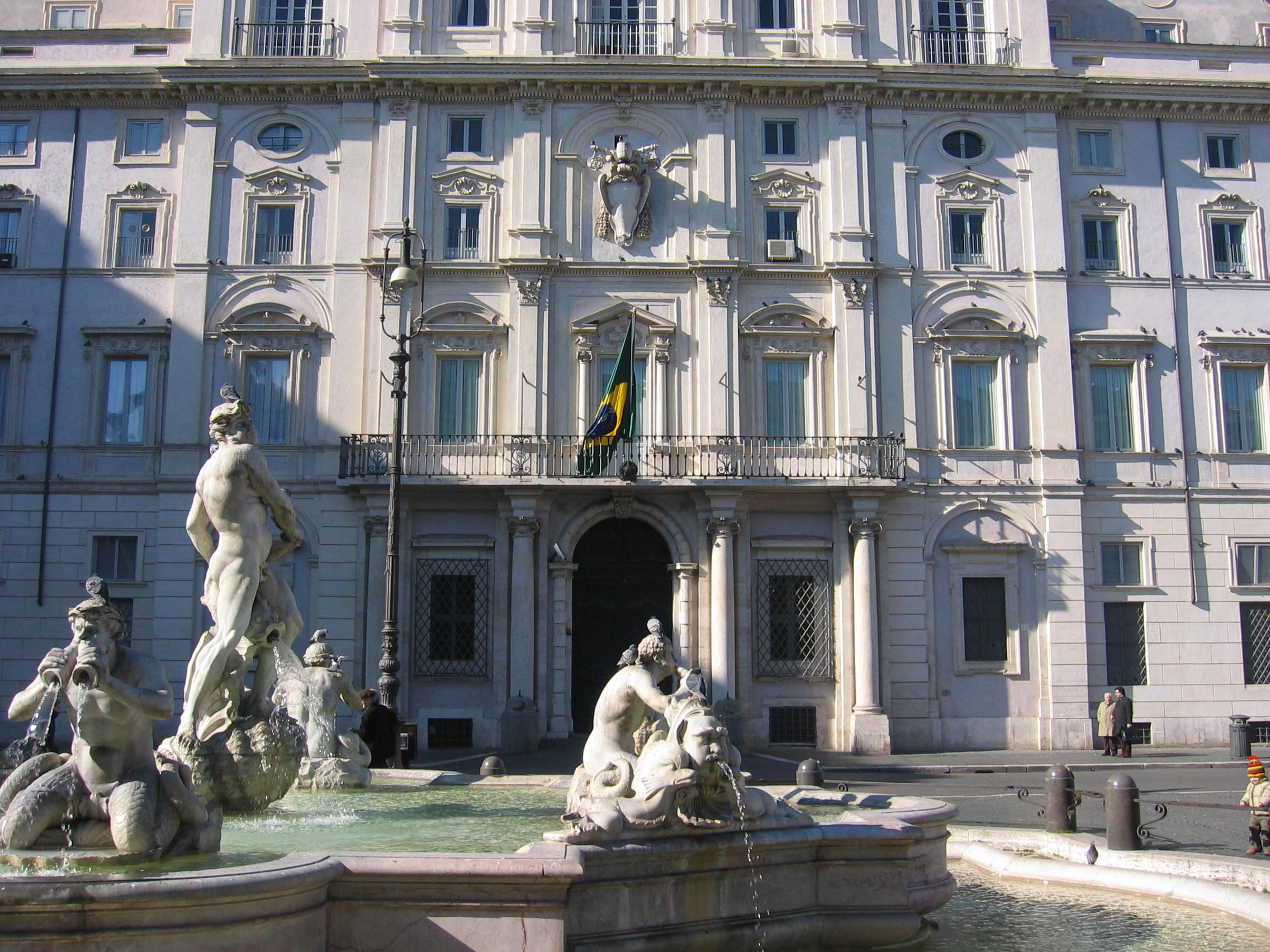
The Palazzo Pamphili in Rome

The House of Pamphili (often with the final long i orthography, Pamphilj) was one of the papal families deeply entrenched in Catholic Church, Roman and Italian politics of the 16th and 17th centuries.

Later, the Pamphili family line merged with the Doria and Landi family lines to form the Doria-Pamphili-Landi family line.

== History ==
The Pamphili surname originated in Gubbio and went to Rome under the pontificate of Pope Innocent VIII (1484–1492).

The peak of Pamphili power came with the election of Giovanni Battista Pamphili as Pope Innocent X, who reigned from 1644–1655. Like the reign of his predecessor Pope Urban VIII (of the equally papal Barberini family), Innocent X's rule was littered with examples of nepotism. Members of the Pamphili family did exceptionally well from the Innocent X papacy.

The following family members were created cardinals:

- Camillo Francesco Maria Pamphili (1644), the Pope's nephew and son of Olimpia Maidalchini, the Pope's sister-in-law and close adviser. He later renounced his cardinalate to marry Olimpia Aldobrandini, widow of Paolo Borghese
- Francesco Maidalchini (1647), nephew of Olimpia Maidalchini
- Camillo Astalli (1650 as "Camillo Astalli-Pamphili"), a cousin of Olimpia Maidalchini whom the Pope had adopted as a Cardinal-Nephew; he was later deprived of this title for disloyalty to Innocent X
- Benedetto Pamphili, son of Camillo Pamphili and Olimpia Aldobrandini, created cardinal by Innocent XI in 1681

Like other Italian noble families, the Pamphili bought property (palazzi or "palaces" and other estates) and created self-styled principalities. Family members regularly had princely titles bestowed upon them by family patriarchs or matriarchs. Olimpia Maidalchini received the honorific title of Princess of San Martino, effectively turning the small enclave of San Martino into a principality in its own right. After he left the cardinalate to marry, Camillo Pamphili was given the titles of Prince of San Martino and Prince of Valmontone (he bought the Valmontone comune in 1634 from the Barberini family).

=== Family tree ===
Pamphili family tree from 1574 to 1760:

Pamphilo da Candiana della Candiana

Pope Innocent X	Pamphilio; Pamphili	Olimpia Maidalchini
Andrea; Giustiniani	Anna Maria; Pamphili	Niccolò Ludovisi	Costanza Pamphili	Camillo Pamphili	Olimpia Aldobrandini	Paolo Borghese
Maffeo Barberini	Olimpia Giustiniani	Maria; Borghese	Giovanni Borghese
Costanza Barberini	Camilla Barberini	Francesco Barberini	Urbano Barberini	Taddeo Barberini
Giovanni Battista Pamphili	Giovanni Andrea; Doria	Anna; Pamphili	Benedetto Pamphili	Teresa Pamphili	Flaminia Pamphili
Doria-Pamphili-Landi

== Wars of Castro ==
Between 1639 and 1649, the Pamphili fought the Wars of Castro alongside the Barberini against the Farnese dukes of Parma who controlled Castro and its surrounding territories. The conflict raged first under Barberini Pope Urban VIII and later under Pamphili Pope Innocent X.

Pope Urban VIII died in 1644 only two months after a peace accord was signed between the papal families and the dukes. Pope Innocent X was elected to replace him. Innocent set about investigating some of the finances related to the conflict which had been administered by the Barberini. A number of Barberini family members were forced into exile but were later reconciled with the papacy and the Pamphili through the marriage of Maffeo Barberini (son of exiled Taddeo Barberini) and Olimpia Giustiniani, a niece of Pope Innocent X.

On the orders of Innocent X, Castro was razed on 2 September 1649 by troops of the Papal Army and never rebuilt.

== Family property ==
Palazzo Pamphilj, by the architects Girolamo Rainaldi and Francesco Borromini, is located in the heart of Rione Parione, south of the church of Sant'Agnese in Agone in Piazza Navona, the Pamphili neighborhood of Rome, named for this reason Isola de' Pamphili. From 1652, on Saturdays and Sundays in August, the piazza was turned into a lake to celebrate the Pamphili family, a festival that was suppressed in 1866. Today, the palace functions as the Brazilian Embassy in Rome. The tomb of Innocent X is located in Sant'Agnese.

In 1634 the Pamphilj bought the baronial palace in Valmontone, a town near Palestrina, outside (Rome): Camillo Pamphili was determined to create a sort of new “ideal city”, so the palace and the main church were rebuilt and decorated by important baroque artists, like the architect Mattia de Rossi (who rose to prominence under the mentorship of Bernini), and the painters Pier Francesco Mola, Gaspard Dughet, Guglielmo Cortese, Francesco Cozza and Mattia Preti.

Another building in central Rome is the Palazzo Doria Pamphilj, which houses the gallery of the same name.
