= Giuseppe Sacripante =

Italian Catholic Cardinal

His Eminence Giuseppe Sacripante
- Prefect of the Congregation for the Propagation of the Faith
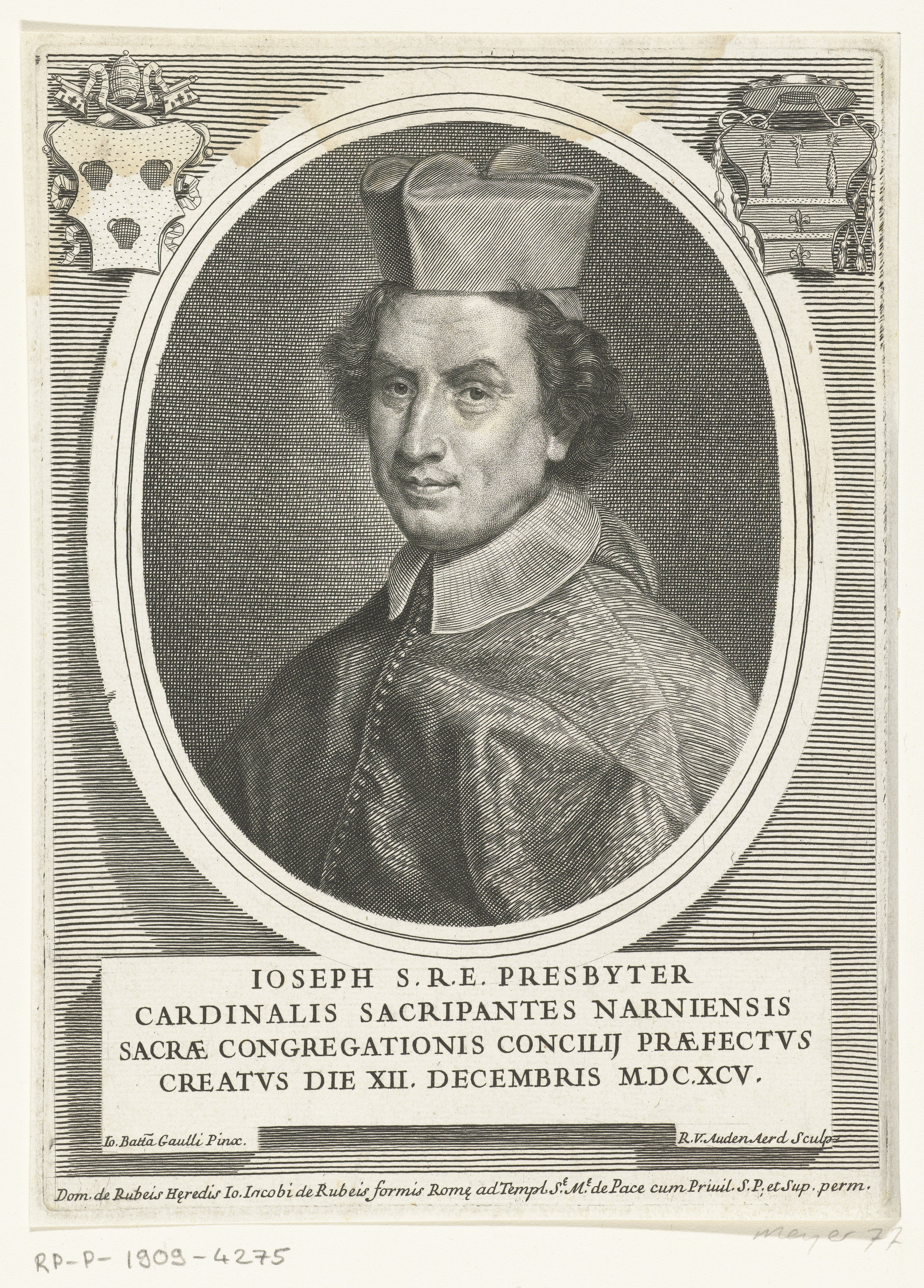
- Church: Roman Catholic
- Appointed: 9 December 1704
- Term ended: 4 January 1727
- Predecessor: Carlo Barberini
- Successor: Silvio Valenti Gonzaga
- Other post: Cardinal-Priest of San Lorenzo in Lucina (1726–27)
- Previous posts: Cardinal-Priest of Santa Prassede (1721–26); Pro-Datary of the Apostolic Datary (1700–04); Prefect of the Congregation of the Council (1696–1700); Cardinal-Priest of Santa Maria in Traspontina (1696–1721)

Orders
- Created cardinal: 12 December 1695 by Pope Innocent XII
- Rank: Cardinal-Priest

Personal details
- Born: 19 March 1642 Narni, Papal States
- Died: 4 January 1727 (aged 84) Rome, Papal States
- Buried: Sant'Ignazio, Rome

Giuseppe Sacripante (19 March 1642 – 4 January 1727) was an Italian Catholic Cardinal who served as Prefect of the Congregation for the Propagation of the Faith.

== Biography ==
He was born in Narni on 19 March 1642, and was the eldest child of Giacinto Sacripante and Vittoria di Basilis. He studied letters and law, and held a number of administrative posts, before being given a canonry of the Archbasilica of Saint John Lateran. He was created Cardinal-Priest by Pope Innocent XII in the consistory of 12 December 1695. He received the title of Santa Maria in Traspontina and was named Prefect of the Congregation of the Council on 2 January 1696. He became Pro-Datary in 1700. In 1704, he was appointed Prefect of the Congregation for the Propagation of the Faith. He became Cardinal-Priest of Santa Prassede in 1721, and then San Lorenzo in Lucina in 1726.

He participated in three papal conclaves; 1700, 1721 and 1724. He died in Rome on 4 January 1727 aged 84.

== Works ==
- Defensio jurisdictionis ecclesiasticæ (1688)
