= Lucrezia Barberini =

Duchess of Modena (1628–1699)

- Duchess of Modena
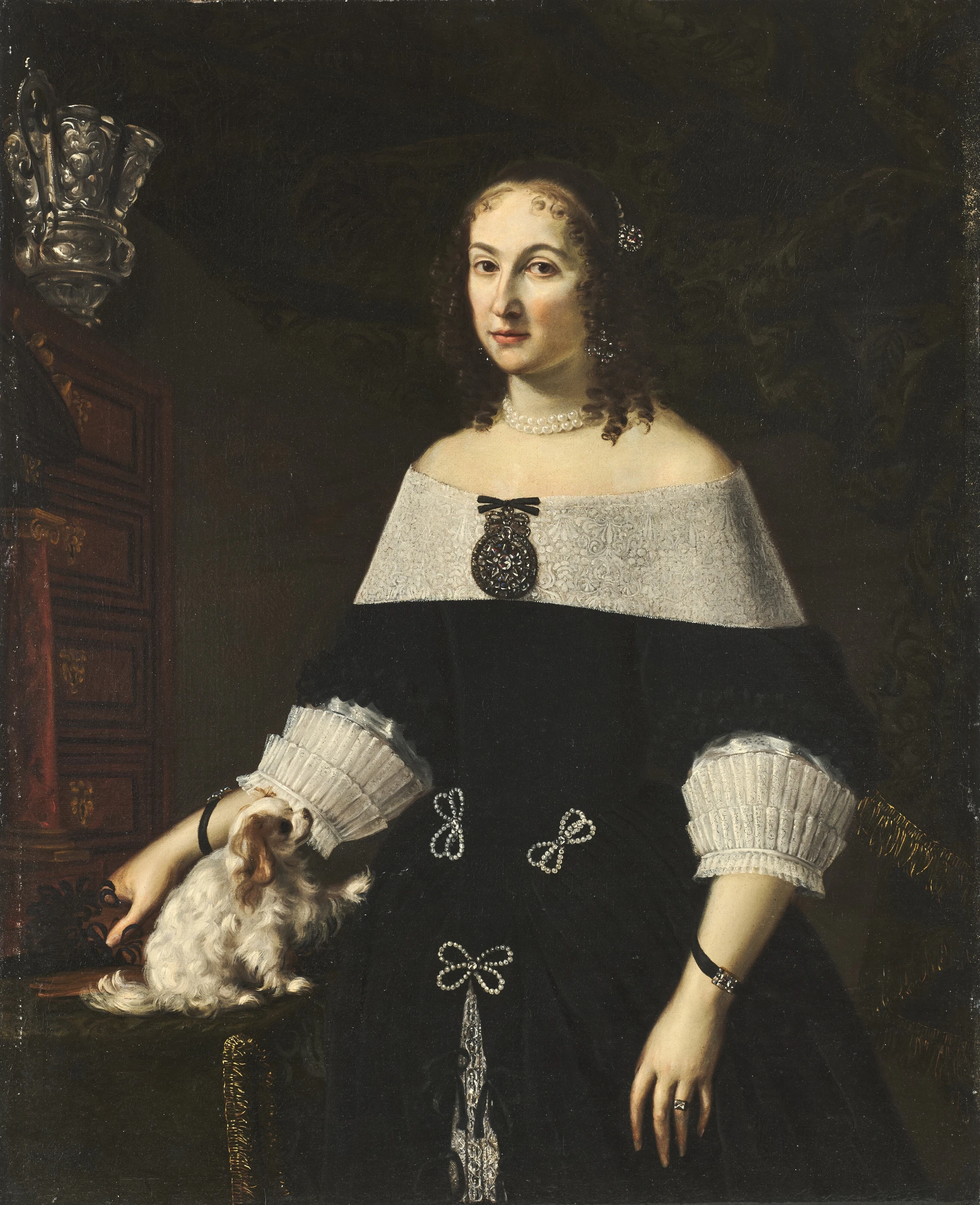
- Portrait by Pier Francesco Cittadini
- Born: 24 October 1628; Rome
- Died: 24 August 1699 (aged 70); Rome
- Spouse: Francesco I d'Este, Duke of Modena
- Issue: Rinaldo, Duke of Modena
- Father: Taddeo Barberini, Prince of Palestrina
- Mother: Anna Colonna

Lucrezia Barberini (24 October 1628 – 24 August 1699) was an Italian noblewoman and, by marriage, Duchess of Modena. Born into the House of Barberini, she was the third wife of Francesco I d'Este, Duke of Modena.

== Biography ==
=== Early life ===
Barberini was born 24 October 1628 in Rome; the eldest of five children to Taddeo Barberini, Prince of Palestrina and his wife Anna Colonna, a daughter of Filippo Colonna, Prince of Paliano. She was baptized on the 8 November in the private chapel of the Palazzo Barberini.

She was the sister of Maffeo Barberini and Cardinal Carlo Barberini and the Grand-Niece of Pope Urban VIII. Her uncles included three Cardinals; Francesco Barberini, Antonio Barberini and Girolamo Colonna.

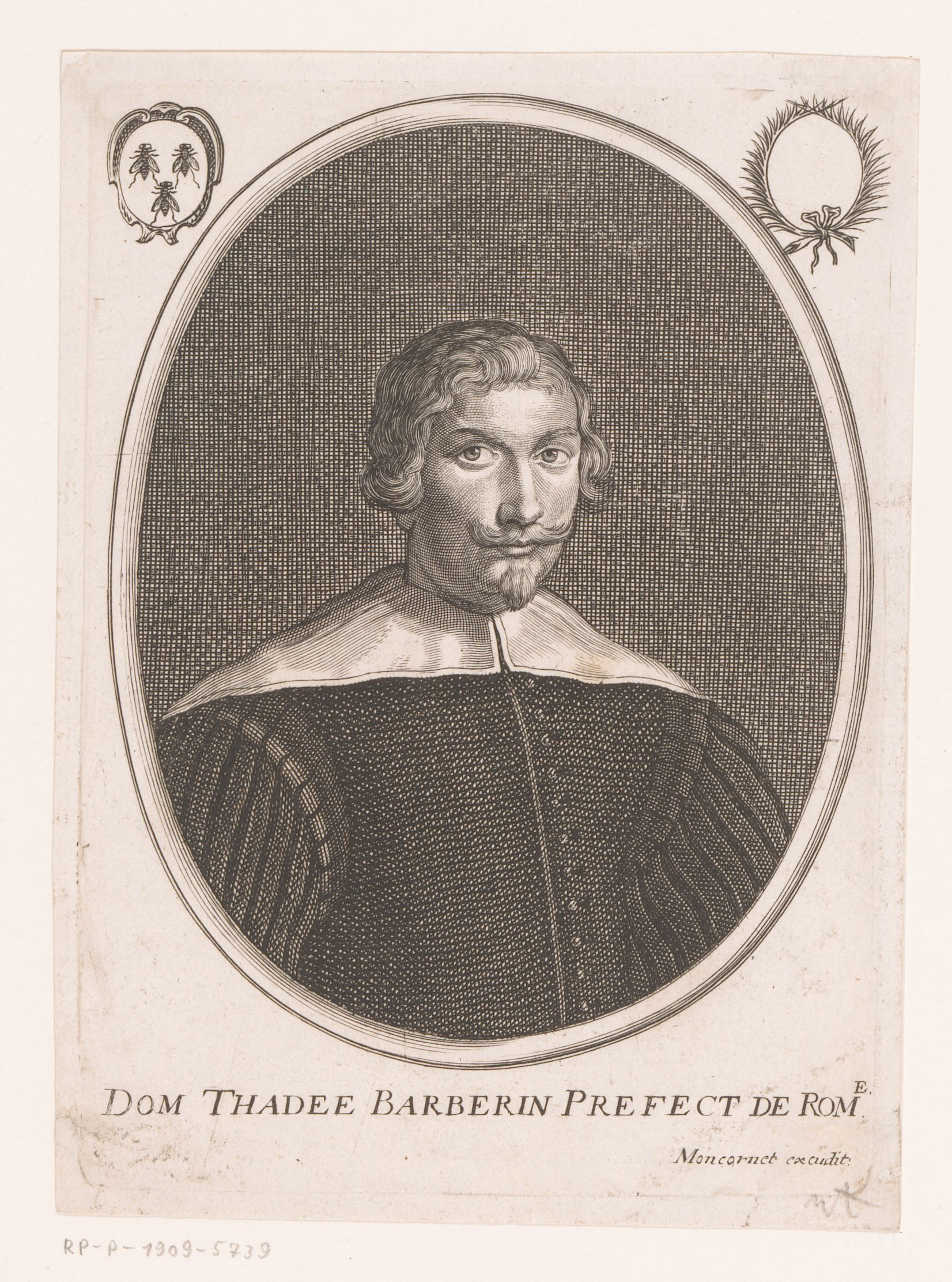
Engraved portrait of Taddeo Barberini, father of Lucrezia

Lucrezia's parents had a good relationship with each other and their parental care is evident in the correspondence between the couple, with Lucrezia's mother informing her husband in great detail about their children and their health. She showed great care for her children, even sleeping by their beds in a makeshift cot when they were ill. Lucrezia's mother was very devout and saw things like the death of one of her children's nurse-maids as a divine punishment.

While still a child, Lucrezia was entrusted to the care of her paternal aunts Camilla and Clarice, who were Carmelite nuns at the monastery Incarnazione del Verbo Divino, founded by Urban VIII. Lucrezia's education and that of her brothers Maffeo and Carlo were ordered by their uncle, Cardinal Francesco, who ignored the wishes of their mother.

In 1639, Camillo Pamphili son of Pamphilio Pamphili and Olimpia Maidalchini was first suggested as a husband to the twelve-year old Lucrezia. Olimpia Maidalchini, the mother of the proposed groom was especially in favor of for the marriage between her son and Lucrezia, as Maidalchini had already married her daughter into a noble family which were part of the Spanish faction and now looked to secure a match for her son that would link them with the French faction. Negotiations for the marriage continued on until 1644, when it thwarted by Camillo´s uncle, the new pope, Innocent XI, who appointed him to the position of cardinal-nephew.

The Barberini had in fact supported Innocent XI in the 1644 election of the new pope rather than of the French candidates Cardinal Bentivoglio and Cardinal Sacchetti favored by France and Cardinal Mazarin.

Mazarin not only considered the Barberini family his allies but also had personal ties to the family as Barberini's maternal grand-mother, Lucrezia Tomacelli had once housed Mazarin´s maternal grand-mother Francesca Turina Bufalini. Mazarins own father Pietro Mazarinno had also been employed by Lucrezias grand-father, Filippo Colonna as a chamberlain.

Expecting the new pope to be grateful towards the Barberini, instead Phamphili (now Innocent XI) turned against the Barberini began an investigation into the financing of the Wars of Castro in which the Barberini had been heavily involved. Innocent XI investigation estimated that the first war had cost the papacy 12 million scudi and special taxes were levied against the residents of Rome to refill church coffers which led to public anger towards the Barberini family.

=== Exile in France ===
Lucrezia´s uncles Antonio and Francesco who had led the papal armies, fearful of their safety were forced to abandon Rome and flee to France, assisted by Cardinal Mazarin. There they depended on the hospitality of Louis XIV, King of France. Soon Lucrezia and her father and siblings followed, escaping at night with their father and with Lucrezia disguised as a boy. After their departure was discovered, Innocent X confiscated the assets of the Barberini family.

The Barberini men and children were now safely in France, Lucrezia's mother Anna, having stayed behind in Rome, was fighting to keep the wealth of the family. Her mother would finally leave Rome in April 1646 to join her husband and children in France. Lucrezias mother was upon her arrival dismayed to finding her daughter living in the Benedictine Val-de-Grâce convent in Paris. Despite the wishes of her mother to have her daughter living with her, Lucrezia would remain in the convent.

While it was not uncommon for young noblewomen to be educated in convents, in this case Lucrezia had been placed there in anticipation of her mother's arrival. Lucrezia's uncles did not want her to be influenced by her mother.

The following year in November, 1647, Lucrezia's father died from phthisis.

==== Marriage plans ====
It was considered in 1649 that Lucrezia might marry François de Vendôme, duc de Beaufort, a legitimized grandson of Henry IV. Beauforts brother was on the verge of becoming betrothed to Laura Mancini, the eldest niece of the Barberini's protector Cardinal Mazarin. Beaufort, unlike his father and brother was opposed to Mazarin. Its likely that Mazarin hoped that marrying Beaufort to a daughter of one of Mazarins allies, Beaufort might overcome his enmity towards the cardinal.

Lucrezia on the other hand being very religious, expressed her desire to take holy orders, but this was dismissed by her uncles. They were in fact planning to find a husband for their niece that would be beneficial for the Barberini family.

However Lucrezia was taken from the convent by her chaperone, Clarice Vaini Rasponi and brought back to Italy.

Lucrezia and her brother Carlo would return to France in 1652 to live with their uncle, Antonio. While living there Lucrezia donated some relics to the Carmelite monastery in Lyon. It was also there that the Duke of Modena sent an envoy to secretly inquire about Lucrezia´s demeanor and appearance.

Lucrezia who still wanted to join a convent but being pressured makes a concession and told her uncles that she was willing to marry - as long as it was a French match.

In 1653, Lucrezia's brother was married to Pope Innocent's grand-niece, Olimpia Giustiniani. The marriage resolved many problems at once, reconciling the Barberini and Pamphili families; allowing the remaining Barberini exiles to return to Rome.

== Marriage ==
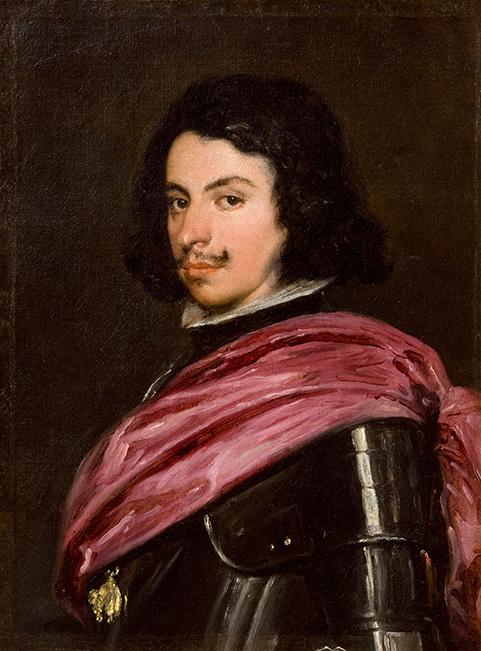
Portrait of Francesco I d'Este by Diego Velázquez, 1638–39

On 13 April 1654 Lucrezia and Francesco I d'Este were married by proxy in Loreto, Marche at the Basilica della Santa Casa.

Lucrezia was met by her husband's brother, the Cardinal Rinaldo d'Este, at the border of Modena, and presented with valuable jewelry, a gift from the Duke of Modena.

14 October 1654 Lucrezia was married to the twice widowed Francesco I d'Este, Duke of Modena in person. In many ways the marriage represented a long-overdue truce between the House of Este and the House of Barberini who had taken sides against each other during the First War of Castro. Francesco had, in fact, fought alongside his father against Taddeo Barberini's troops.

The marriage celebrations lasted for several days, culminating in a tournament and fireworks in the Piazza Grande of Modena and according to a poem read in honor of the couple "Spring sang sumptuous verses to the bride, rejoicing that the Barberine bees, coming to suck the sweet honey of the Este lilies, promised a new golden age". Francesco even opened the fortress of the Citadel for the first time to the curiosity of the people and this was the greatest demonstration of esteem he could show his bride, "having nothing that he holds with greater regard and jealousy than that".

They had one son, Rinaldo d'Este, Duke of Modena, who married Charlotte of Brunswick-Lüneburg. Through this child, she is ancestor of the royal house of Austria-Este.

Francesco while waging war against the Spanish in Lombardy in 1658, and having conquered of Mortara, contracted malaria and died in Santhiá. He was succeeded by his son (Lucrezia´s step-son) Alfonso.

== Widowhood ==
Lucrezia who had always had a strong attachment to religion had for a long time wanted to devote herself to such a life, but had been prohibited to do so. The day after her husbands death, she wrote to her uncle Francesco asking to retire to the convent Order of the Visitation of Holy Mary in Lyon as a secular member Lucrezia considered that she had fulfilled her duty to her family by having married "a husband of good merit" and given birth to a son.

Lucrezia even went so far as proclaim that she was prepared even to leave her son, the three year old Rinaldo behind in Modena, and make him the heir of all her assets. She would however in the end be convinced by her family of her maternal duties, and by her husband's last wish – as Francesco had requested in his will that she would stay in Modena and raise their son.

It was only in 1682 that Lucrezia was given permission to retire to the Ursuline convent Incarnazione del Verbo Divino in Rome, where she took the name Felice Maddalena del Crucifisso Gesu [english : Felicia Magdalena of the Crucificed Jesus]

Lucrezia also started a charitable foundation the Opera Pia Barberini [English :The Barberini Religious Charity] in 1682 who supplied dowries for Jewish young women who converted to Christianity.

Though a member of the convent Lucrezia was however, allowed to leave the convent and go outside, and sometimes she also brought ladies into convent, even though "during the last years she refrained from bringing them here so that the nuns would not have any distraction or disturbances, which on these occasions the secular women usually bring to the well-regulated monasteries"

Lucrezia also maintained a friendship with Laura Martinozzi, the wife of her step-son Alfonso IV d'Este.

== Death ==
Lucrezia died on 24 August 1699, while staying at convent San Maria Maddalena Pazzi in Modena, where she was also buried.
