= Maffeo Barberini (1631–1685) =

Italian nobleman (1631-1685)

- Prince of Palestrina, Count of Pacentro, Count of Gagliano, Gonfalonier of the Church
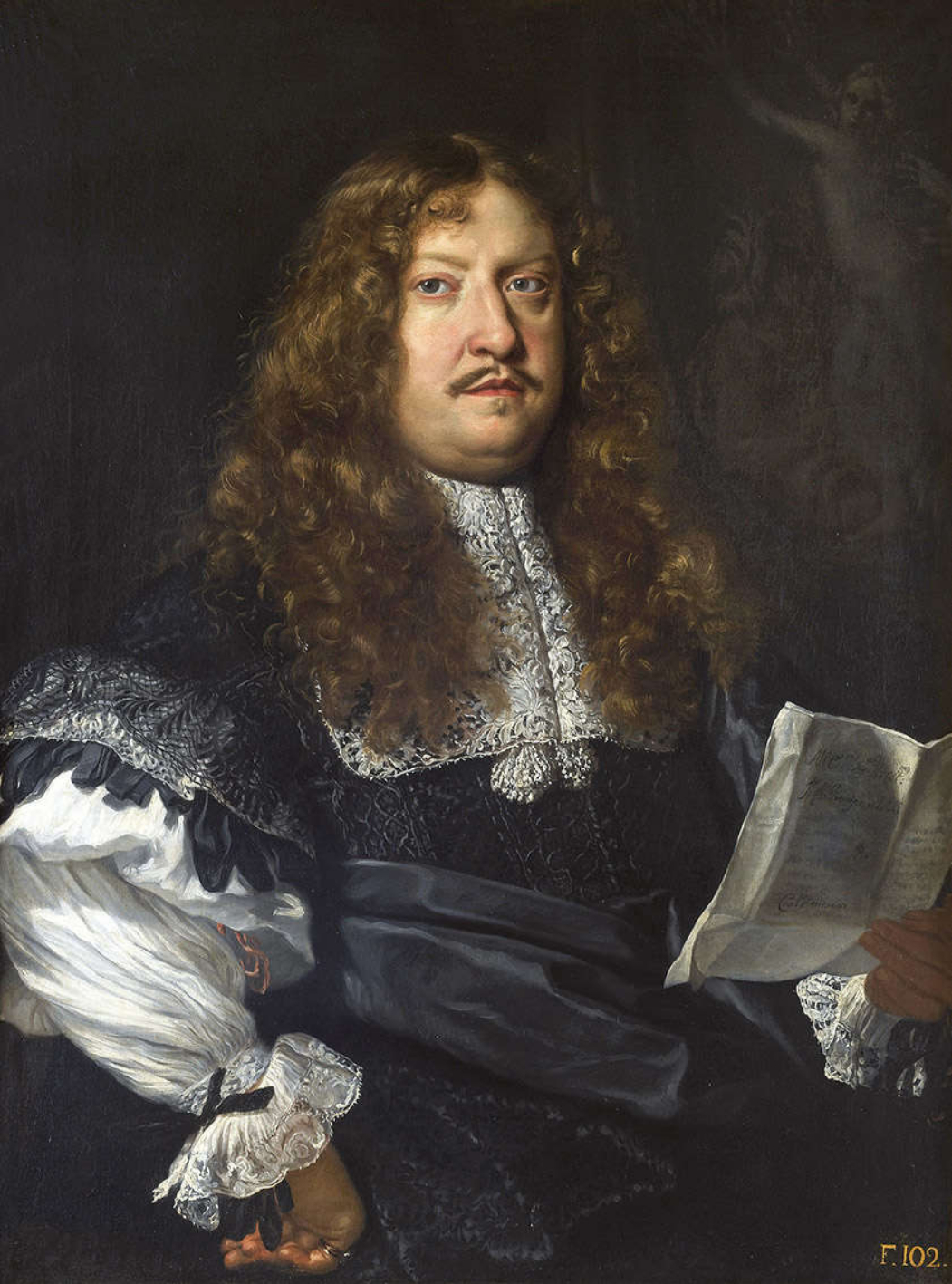
- Portrait of Prince Maffeo Barberini by Carlo Maratta, 1670/71
- Successor: Urbano Barberini
- Born: 19 August 1631; Rome
- Died: 28 November 1685 (aged 54); Villa Bagnaia
- Buried: Church of Santa Rosalia, Palestrina
- Spouse: Olimpia Giustiniani
- Father: Taddeo Barberini
- Mother: Anna Colonna

Maffeo Barberini (19 August 1631 – 28 November 1685) was an Italian nobleman of the Barberini and Prince of Palestrina. He was appointed Gonfalonier of the Church.

== Family ==
Born in 1631, Barberini was one of the five children of Taddeo Barberini and Anna Colonna, daughter of Filippo I Colonna. His siblings included cardinal Carlo Barberini and Lucrezia Barberini who married Francesco I d'Este, Duke of Modena.

His great uncle (on his father's side) was Barberini Pope Urban VIII.

== Wars of Castro ==
Between 1639 and 1649, the Barberini fought the Wars of Castro alongside the Pamphili family. Maffeo's father, Taddeo, and Luigi Mattei led the papal armies loyal to Pope Urban VIII and the Barberini family. In 1644, after the first War of Castro, Pope Urban VIII died and Pamphili family Pope Innocent X was elected in his place. Pope Innocent subsequently began an investigation into Antonio Barberini (Maffeo's uncle), prompting him to flee into exile with his two brothers, Francesco and Taddeo (Maffeo's father).

== Marriage and titles ==
Taddeo Barberini died in exile in Paris but the Barberini and Pamphili families were reconciled when, in 1653, his son Maffeo married Olimpia Giustiniani, grand-niece of Pope Innocent X. The marriage had been engineered by Giustiniani's maternal grandmother, papal power-broker Olimpia Maidalchini, and Barberini's uncle, Cardinal Antonio Barberini. Maidalchini, realizing her influence over Pope Innocent was waning, arranged the marriage to facilitate a return of the Barberini to Rome in order to curry favor with a number of the Barberini family's cardinals. The Barberini, too, were keen to return to Rome and were enthusiastic about Maidalchini's plan to marry Pope Innocent's grand-niece, Guistiniani, into their family.

Despite the fact that 12-year-old Guistiniani stubbornly refused to marry her 22-year-old suitor, surprising few, the two were married at a lavish ceremony celebrated by Pope Innocent himself. After the ceremony, however, the child refused to go home with her new groom to allow the marriage to be consummated. Her mother, who had barely been involved in her upbringing, appealed to her by telling her that other girls were forced to marry decrepit old men and that, by comparison, Barberini was a far better option. When the child still refused, Maidalchini forced her granddaughter into a carriage that took her to the Palazzo Barberini and a new life as a daughter of the Barberini.

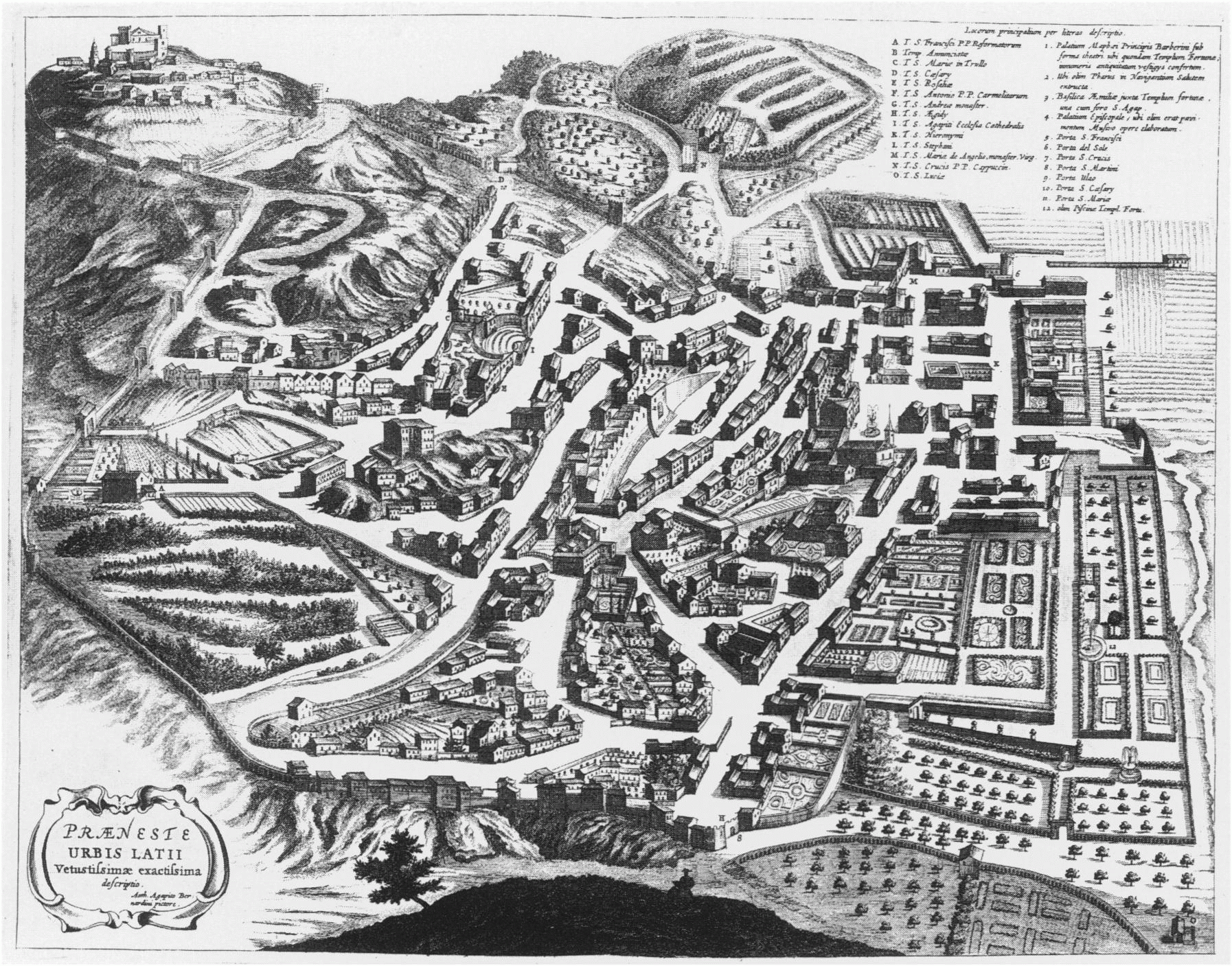
Palestrina as it appeared in 1671 during Maffeo Barberini's administration.

Barberini was later restored to his father's former title of Prince of Palestrina - nominal patriarch of the Palestrina comune owned by the Barberini family. He was likely also appointed Gonfalonier of the Church on the same basis. Barberini commissioned the construction of the Church of Santa Rosalia in Palestrina (opened in 1677) which includes a tribute to Maffeo's father Taddeo by Bernardino Cametti, commissioned by Maffeo's son Cardinal Francesco.

In 1662, on the death of his uncle (his mother's brother), he applied to King Philip IV of Spain to acquire all feuds and titles (within the King's dominion) which had belonged to the Colonna. The king agreed, despite potential claims from Colonna descendants, and gave Maffeo permission to take control of a series of comunes including and Petrella Salto. Barberini was also given permission to take control of the comune of Torre Annunziata which had been owned by the Orsini family but had been seized by the Spanish Treasury several years earlier.

After further negotiations, in 1664, Barberini officially purchased the Pacentro comune from the Colonna and added Count of Pacentro to his titles. Four years later he purchased the Gagliano comune and thus became Count of Gagliano.

In 1668, he was made a Knight of the Order of the Golden Fleece.

Maffeo Barberini died on 28 November 1685 while he was in residence at the Villa Bagnaia. The villa constituted a part of the estate of Ippolito Lante Montefeltro della Rovere, Duke of Bomarzo and nephew of Cardinal Marcello Lante della Rovere; a contemporary and ally of Maffeo's uncles and father who had been Bishop of Palestrina.

== Patron of the arts ==
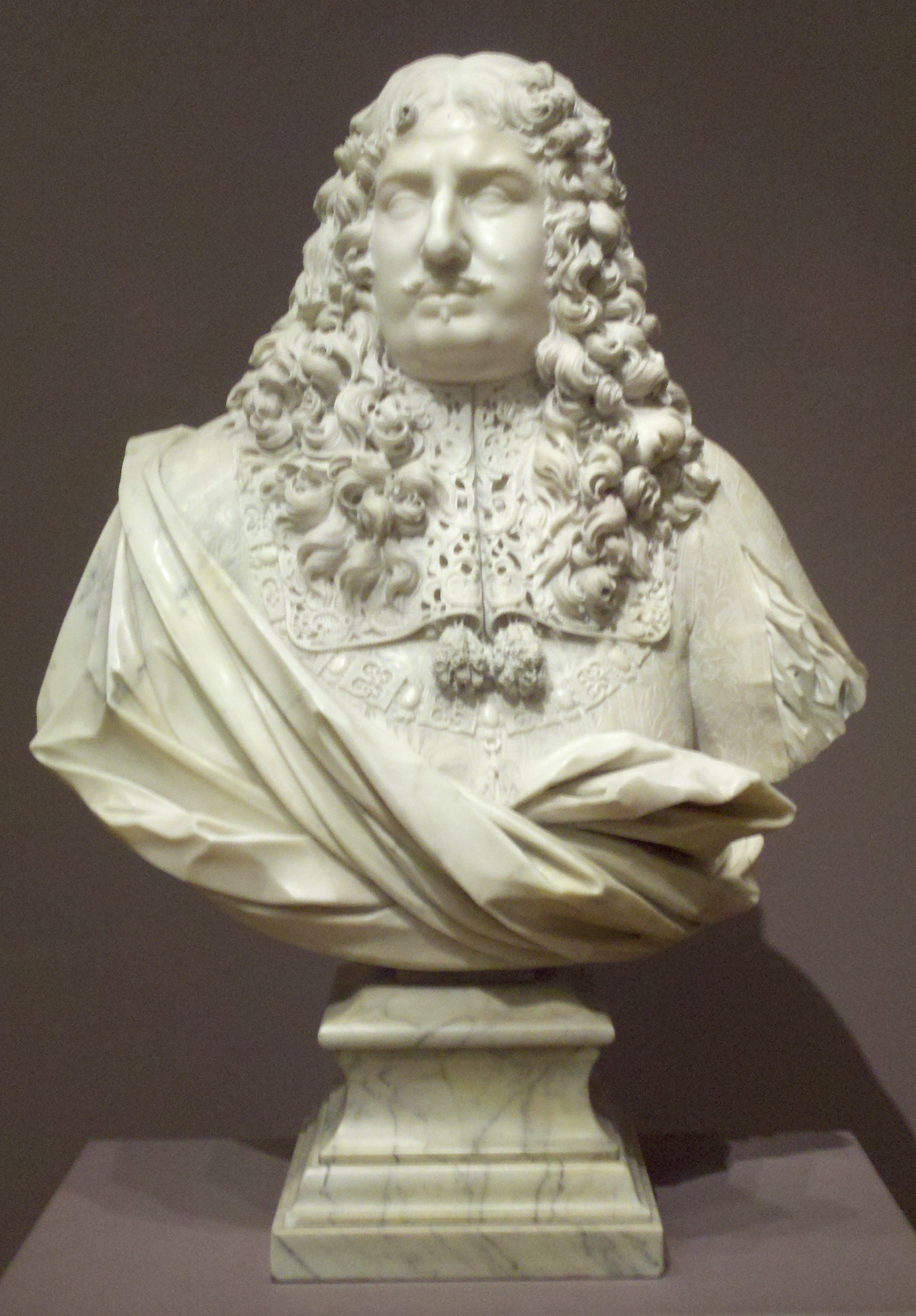
Maffeo Barberini bust c. 1685 by Lorenzo Ottoni

Barberini continued the patronage of the arts started by his family members before him. He was, if only for the purpose of maintaining the wealth of the Barberini a collector of art and became the owner of the art collection previously owned by his uncle Antonio Barberini which included at least three paintings by Caravaggio.

Barberini also commissioned paintings by Niccolò Tornioli. In 1653, hereopened the Teatro delle Quattro Fontane after it had been closed for more than 10 years while his uncles and father had been in exile. It continued to host operatic performances until it was damaged by fire and abandoned.

In 1647 the composer Angelo Olivieri entered his service. Olivieri remained connected to the Barberini family until his death in 1715.

== Issue ==
Maffeo Barberini and Olimpia Giustiniani had five children:

- Costanza Barberini (1655–1687), married duke Francesco Caetani of Caserta in 1680.
- Camilla Barberini (1657–1740), married count Carlo Borromeo-Arese in 1689.
- Francesco Barberini (1662–1738), cardinal from 1690.
- Urbano Barberini (1664–1722), who would inherit his father's titles in 1685.
- Taddeo Barberini (1666–1702), married Maria Teresa Muti in 1701 but died childless.

== See also ==
- Order of the Golden Fleece
- List of knights of the Golden Fleece
- Palestrina
