= Francesco Barberini (1662–1738) =

Italian Cardinal (1662–1738)

His Eminence Francesco Barberini
- Dean of the College of Cardinals
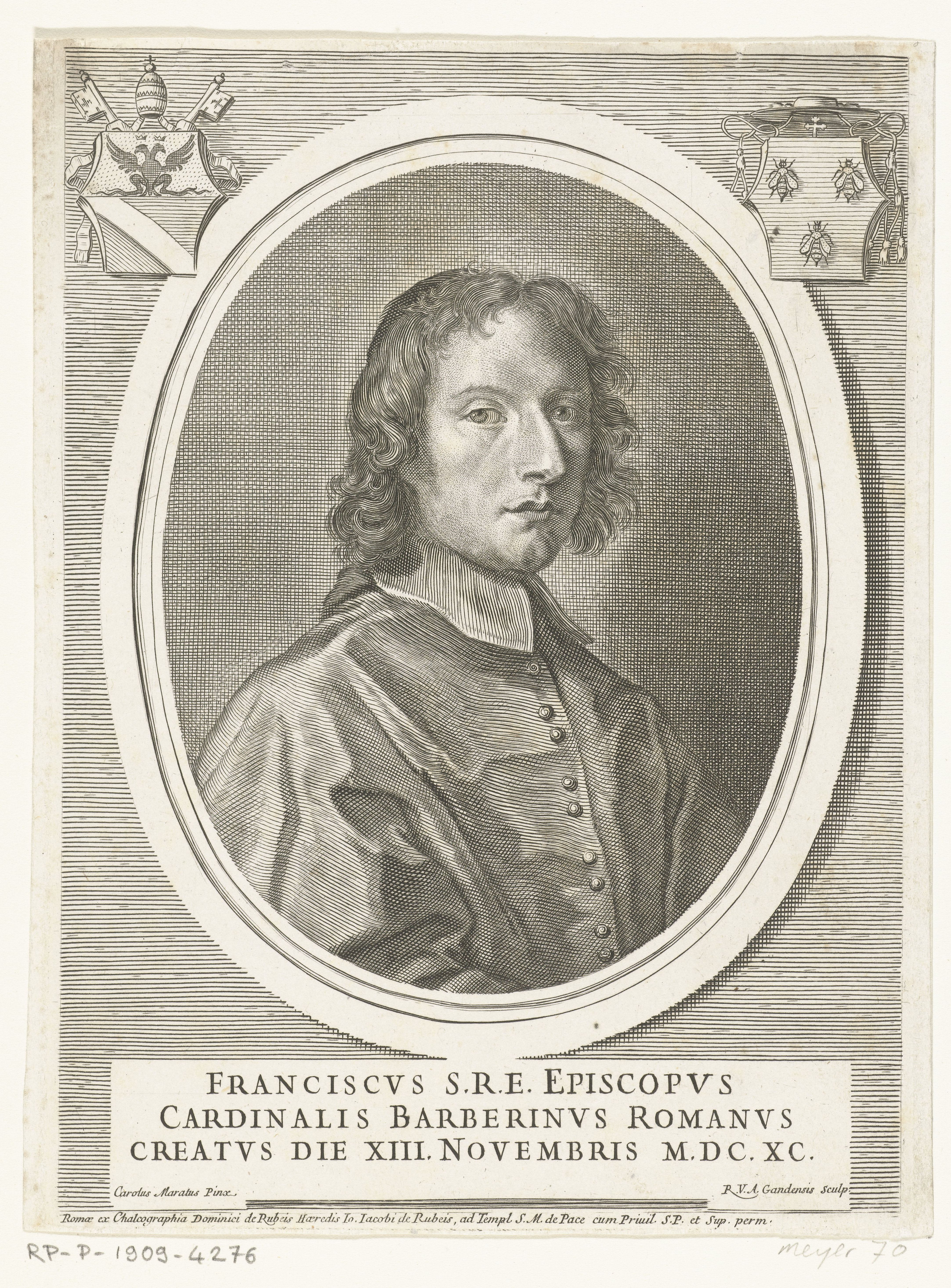
- Church: Catholic Church
- In office: 1734–1738
- Other post: Cardinal-Bishop of Ostia e Velletri (1726–1738)

Orders
- Ordination: 26 September 1700 (deacon); 15 September 1715 (priest)
- Consecration: 16 Mar 1721 (bishop) by Fabrizio Paolucci
- Created cardinal: 13 November 1690 by Pope Alexander VIII

Personal details
- Born: 12 November 1662 Rome, Papal States
- Died: 17 August 1738 (age 75) Rome, Papal States
- Coat of arms

Francesco Barberini, iuniore (12 November 1662 – 17 August 1738) was an Italian Cardinal of the family of Pope Urban VIII (1623–1644) and of the Princes of Palestrina.

== Biography ==
He was born in Rome, the eldest son of Maffeo Barberini and Olimpia Giustiniani (a niece of Pope Innocent X), the nephew of cardinal Carlo Barberini and the grandson of Taddeo Barberini (a nephew of Pope Urban VIII). He was the grand-nephew of Cardinal Francesco Barberini who was also a nephew of Pope Urban. Francesco was also a cousin of Rinaldo d'Este, Duke of Modena whose mother was his aunt, Lucrezia Barberini.

He gave up his birthright (as eldest son) for an ecclesiastic career thereby making his brother, Urbano Barberini, heir to the Barberini estate. When his sister-in-law, Felice Ventimiglia Pignatelli d'Aragona separated from Urbano, she sought refuge with Francesco and joined a convent within his bishopric. She later bequeathed her dowry to the Cardinal.

He was created cardinal by Pope Alexander VIII on 13 November 1690 with the dispensation of having an uncle (Carlo Barberini) in the Sacred College and for not having yet received the minor orders. He was named cardinal-deacon of Sant'Angelo in Pescheria although not ordained to the diaconate until ten years later.

He was ordained priest in 1715. He participated in the five papal conclaves (1691, 1700, 1721, 1724 and 1730). Abbot of Farfa and Subiaco from 1704. On 3 Mar 1721, he was named Cardinal-Bishop of Palestrina and on 16 Mar 1721, he was consecrated bishop by Fabrizio Paolucci, Cardinal-Bishop of Albano, with Vincenzo Petra, Titular Archbishop of Damascus, and Bernardo Maria Conti, Bishop Emeritus of Terracina, Priverno e Sezze, serving as co-consecrators.

On 1 July 1726, he was appointed Cardinal-Bishop of Ostia e Velletri. That same year, he arranged the kidnapping of his twelve-year-old niece, Cornelia Constance Barberini, in a custody dispute with her mother, Maria Teresa Boncompagni, in order to arrange a marriage between Cornelia and Giulio Cesare Colonna di Sciarra.

He became dean of the Sacred College of Cardinals in December 1734. He died at his Roman palace, at the age of 75.

== Patron of the Arts ==
In 1704, he commissioned Bernardino Cametti to create funerary monuments for his grandfather Taddeo and great-uncle Antonio Barberini in the family Church of Santa Rosalia in Palestrina.

After the death of Urbano in 1722, Francesco inherited a number of pieces of artwork, including Caravaggio's The Cardsharps. He also owned Claude Lorrain's Seaport with the Embarkation of Saint Ursula previously owned by his great-uncle Cardinal Francesco Barberini, and Pietro da Cortona's The Madonna and child with Saint Martina (1645).

Catholic Church titles
Preceded by Gasparo Cavalieri	Cardinal-Deacon of Sant'Angelo in Pescheria; 1690–1715	Succeeded by Carlo Colonna
Preceded by Lorenzo Casoni	Cardinal-Priest of San Bernardo alle Terme; 1715–1718	Succeeded by Bernardo Maria Conti
Preceded by Bandino Panciatici	Cardinal-Priest of Santa Prassede; 1718–1721	Succeeded by Giuseppe Sacripante
Preceded by Francesco del Giudice	Cardinal-Bishop of Palestrina; 1721–1726	Succeeded by Tommaso Ruffo
Preceded by Fabrizio Paolucci	Cardinal-Bishop of Ostia e Velletri; 1726–1738	Succeeded by Pietro Ottoboni
