= Taddeo Barberini =

Italian nobleman (1603–1647)

- Prince of Palestrina; Gonfalonier of the Church; Prefect of Rome; Governor of the Borgo
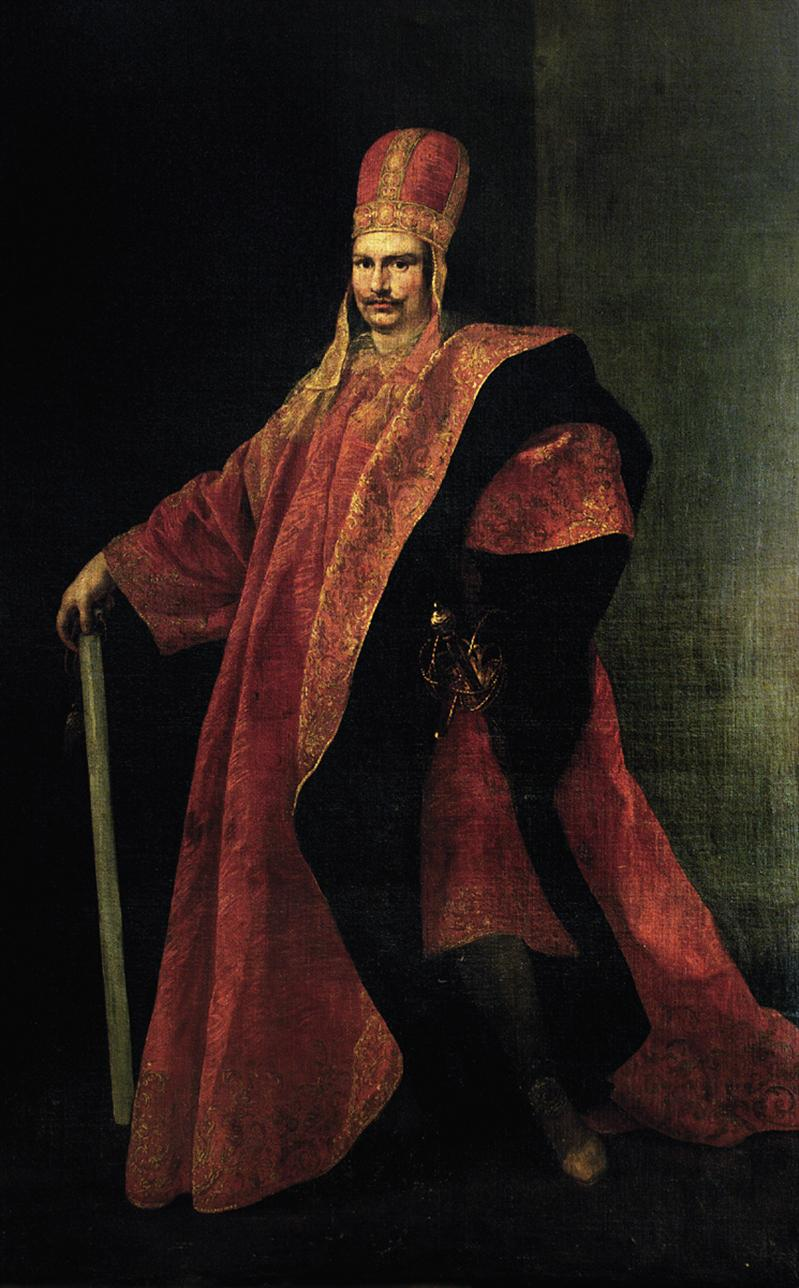
- Portrait by Andrea Sacchi, c. 1631
- Successor: Maffeo Barberini
- Born: 1603; Rome, Papal States
- Died: 1647 (aged 43–44); Paris, Kingdom of France
- Spouse: Anna Colonna
- Father: Carlo Barberini
- Mother: Costanza Magalotti

Taddeo Barberini (1603–1647) was an Italian nobleman of the House of Barberini who became Prince of Palestrina and Gonfalonier of the Church; commander of the Papal Army. He was a nephew of Pope Urban VIII and brother of Cardinals Francesco Barberini and Antonio Barberini. Thanks to their uncle's famous nepotism, the brothers shaped 17th-century Italian politics, religion, art, music and architecture.

== Biography ==
Barberini was born in 1603, the son of Carlo Barberini and Costanza Magalotti. He was the nephew of brothers cardinal Maffeo Barberini (later Pope Urban VIII) and Antonio Marcello Barberini (later also Cardinal) and of Lorenzo Magalotti. He was the brother of Francesco Barberini and Antonio Barberini, both of whom became Cardinals when their uncle became pope. Like his brothers, Taddeo was educated at the Collegio Romano.

=== Pontificate of Pope Urban VIII ===
In 1623, Maffeo Barberini was elected as Pope Urban VIII and Taddeo Barberini's fortunes improved considerably. Almost immediately, Barberini was appointed Gonfalonier of the Church; Commander of the Papal Army, though during later conflicts his brother Cardinal Antonio Barberini also commanded papal and mercenary troops in the field.

In 1624, Taddeo took control of the Duchy of Urbino, relinquished to Urban VIII after the death of Federico Ubaldo. When Francesco Maria died in 1631, the duchy was transferred to the Papal States.

On 14 October 1627 Barberini married Anna Colonna, daughter of Filippo I Colonna, at a lavish service presided over by the pope himself at the Castel Gandolfo. The agreement drawn up by Cardinal Fabrizio Verospi between the Barberini and Colonnas stipulated a dowry worth some 180,000 scudi which included cash and credit as well as a Colonna castle in Anticoli. It is thought the transfer of the Palestrina comune between the two families was tied to the agreement; part of Anna Colonna's dowry. Upon transfer, the commune became a fief of the Barberini which allowed the family to appoint one of its number as Prince of Palestrina, a title which was passed from one Barberini patriarch to another while the comune remained among family possessions. Taddeo's son Carlo Barberini later renounced his right to inherit his father's titles (as he would have done as eldest son) to become a cardinal. Taddeo's hereditary titles therefore passed to his second son, Maffeo.

As Prince of Palestrina, Taddeo worked to improve local buildings and establish new services, even if many of them were primarily self-serving. He rebuilt the Palazzo Barberini (which still houses the Nile mosaic of Palestrina) and his son Maffeo later commissioned a new church nearby. Taddeo built a small private casino which operated for a few years during his administration but closed when future princes had no interest in gambling.

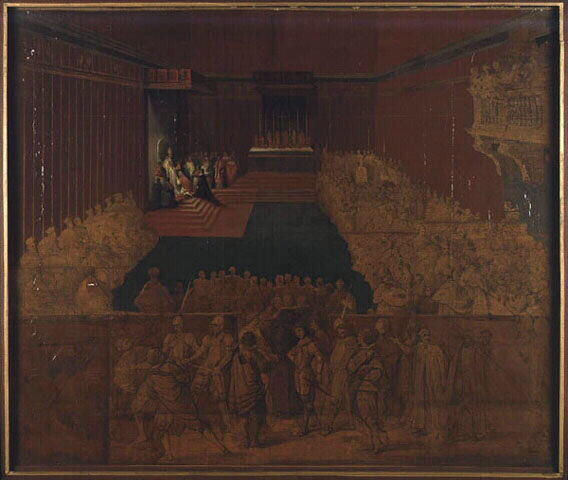
Investiture of Taddeo Barberini as Prefect by Pope Urban

Pope Urban further honoured his nephew in 1631 by appointing him Governor of the Borgo, Commander of Sant'Angelo and Prefect of Rome. Taddeo's investiture as prefect was celebrated with much pomp and extravagance.

It is estimated that by 1632, Taddeo's property was worth as much as 4 million scudi and that over the course of Urban VIII's 21-year reign, Taddeo amassed 42 million scudi in personal wealth. By 1635, income from Taddeo's property was estimated at 100,000 scudi per year.

=== First War of Castro ===
In 1639, Odoardo Farnese, Duke of Parma and Piacenza, came to Rome and during his visit managed to insult Taddeo's cardinal brothers. Pope Urban responded by banning grain shipments from Farnese controlled areas. When the Farnese were then unable to pay their debts the Pope sent debt collectors. Finally the Pope troops to occupy Castro. The Pope's forces were led by Antonio Barberini, his mercenary field commander Luigi Mattei and by Fabrizio Savelli. When Savelli proved to be an unenthusiastic commander, he was returned to Rome and Taddeo Barberini was appointed in his place.

Castro fell without significant resistance and the victory was celebrated in song by Barberini family composer, Marco Marazzoli. But the victory was short-lived and thereafter papal troops suffered a series of decisive losses. Pope Urban was forced to accept defeat and signed a peace treaty with the Farnese Dukes in an attempt to prevent them from marching on Rome itself.

=== Exile and death ===
In 1644, Taddeo's uncle Pope Urban VIII died and the College of Cardinals elected Pope Innocent X of the Pamphili family. At the Papal conclave of 1644, Taddeo's cardinal brothers engineered a deal to ensure the safety of their family's fortunes. But the new Pope refused to honour the deal and launched an investigation into alleged financial abuses during the First War of Castro. Taddeo Barberini and his brothers were forced into exile and fled to Paris in 1646 where they were supported by Cardinal Jules Mazarin. Taddeo's wife Anna Colonna appealed to Pope Innocent urging him to allow the Barberini to keep their property. Innocent agreed but the Barberini remained in exile for several more years.

Taddeo Barberini died in 1647 while in exile in France without ever seeing Rome again.

== Issue ==
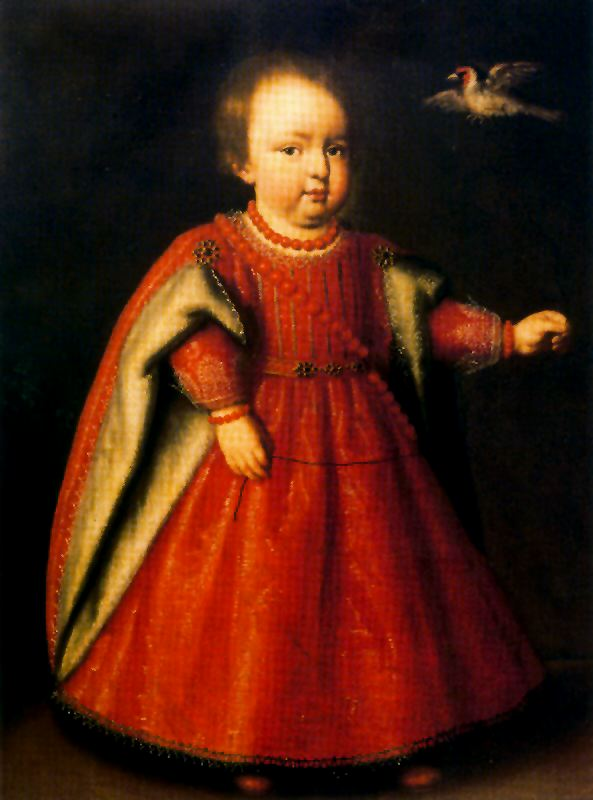
Camilla Barberini as a child, shortly before her death; painted by Tiberio Tito.

Taddeo and Anna Colonna had five children:

- Lucrezia Barberini (1628–1699) who married Francesco I d'Este, Duke of Modena
- Camilla Barberini (1629–1631) who died in infancy
- Carlo Barberini (1630–1704) who became a Cardinal
- Maffeo Barberini who became Prince of Palestrina
- Niccolò Maria Barberini (1635–1699)

== Legacy ==
The Barberini family was reconciled with the papacy, at least in part, through Taddeo's two sons, Carlo Barberini and Maffeo Barberini. Carlo was elevated to cardinal by Pope Innocent X and Maffeo married a grand-niece of Pope Innocent X, Olimpia Giustiniani, and in turn had a son who was elevated to cardinal, Francesco Barberini (Junior). Taddeo's daughter, Lucrezia Barberini, married Francesco I d'Este, Duke of Modena.

Barberini's secretary, Corinzio Benicampi, accompanied the young Carlo Maratta to Rome in 1636. The well-known Baroque artist later received one of his first commissions, The Glory of Saints, from Taddeo. The painting was finished in 1645, two years before Taddeo's death.

== See also ==
- Palazzo Barberini ai Giubbonari
