= Carlo Barberini =

Italian cardinal (1630–1704)

- Prefect of the Congregation for Propagation of the Faith
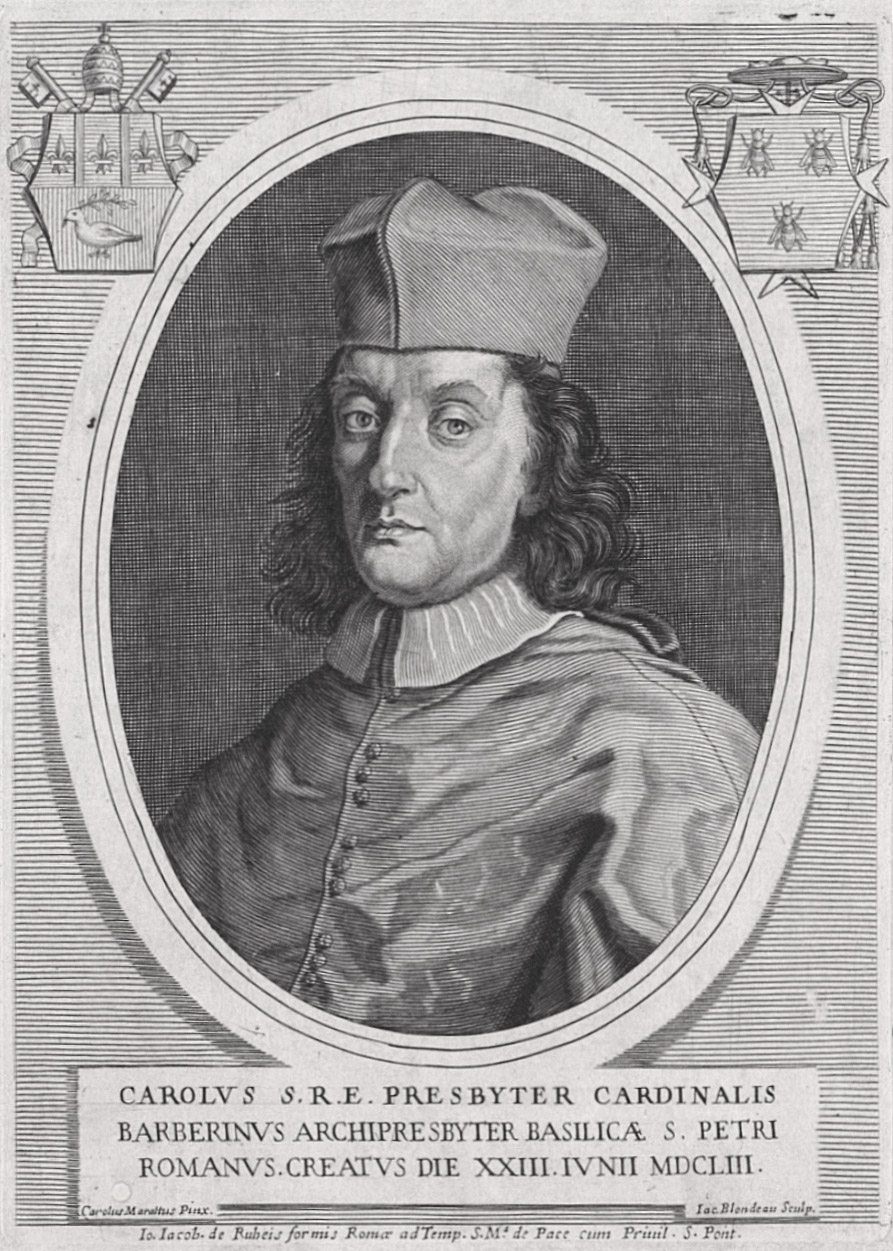
- Cardinal Carlo Barberini (c. 1700)
- Church: Catholic Church
- In office: 17 July 1698 – 2 October 1704
- Predecessor: Paluzzo Paluzzi Altieri degli Albertoni
- Successor: Giuseppe Sacripante
- Other posts: Cardinal-Priest of San Lorenzo in Lucina (1685-1704); Archpriest of St. Peter's Basilica (1667-1704)
- Previous posts: Cardinal-Priest of Santa Maria della Pace (1683-1685); Cardinal-Deacon of Santa Maria in Cosmedin (1675-1683); Cardinal-Deacon of San Cesareo in Palatio (1653-1661, 1667-1675); Cardinal-Deacon of Sant'Angelo in Pescheria (1660-1667)

Orders
- Ordination: 18 September 1683
- Created cardinal: 23 June 1653 by Pope Innocent X

Personal details
- Born: 1 June 1630 Rome, Papal States
- Died: 2 October 1704 (aged 74) Rome, Papal States

Carlo Barberini (1 June 1630 – 2 October 1704) was an Italian Catholic cardinal and member of the Barberini family. He was the grand-nephew of Maffeo Barberini (Pope Urban VIII) and son of Taddeo Barberini (Prince of Palestrina).

== Early life and family history ==
Carlo Barberini was born 1 June 1630 in Rome. He was the son of Taddeo Barberini, Prince of Palestrina and Anna Colonna, daughter of Filippo I Colonna. He was the younger brother of Lucrezia Barberini and the older brother of Maffeo Barberini. He was the nephew of Taddeo's cardinal brothers, Francesco Barberini (Senior) and Antonio Barberini and was himself the uncle of Francesco Barberini (Junior), the son of his brother Maffeo.

Barberini and his younger brother Maffeo played a role in reconciling the Barberini family with the papacy (at that stage Pope Innocent X) after the Wars of Castro. Maffeo married a niece of Pope Innocent X and Carlo was elevated to cardinal by Pope Innocent X in 1653. It had originally been proposed that Carlo marry the Pope's niece but he instead suggested it was an ecclesiastic career that he sought.

== Ecclesiastic career ==
Barberini participated in 7 papal conclaves. Barberini was the cardinal deacon of the titulus of San Cesareo in Palatio (18 August 1653), then of S. Angelo in Pescheria (14 November 1667) and finally of S. Maria in Cosmedin (2 December 1675). He was later promoted to rank of cardinal-priest of the titulus of S. Maria della Pace (27 September 1683). After becoming protopriest of the Sacred College, he was transferred to the title of S. Lorenzo in Lucina, proper of senior cardinal-priest (30 April 1685).

In 1667, he was named archpriest of the Vatican Basilica.

Carlo Barberini acted in the papal curia as cardinal-protector of the Duchy of Savoy (from 1671), of the Catholic cantons of Switzerland (from 1680) and of the Kingdom of Poland (from 1681).

He died on 2 October 1704 and he has been buried in the basilica Santa Maria in Aracoeli
