= 1639 in music =

The year 1639 in music involved some significant events.

== Publications ==
- Agostino Agazzari – Litaniae Beatissimae Virginis, Op. 21 (Rome: Vincenzo Blanco)
- Francesco Corbetta – De gli scherzi armonici, a collection of guitar music, published in Bologna
- Melchior Franck – Zwey neue Christliche Epicedia for eight voices (Coburg: Johann Eyrich), two funeral motets
- Duarte Lobo – Second book of masses for four, five, and six voices (Antwerp: Balthasar Moreti for Plantin)
- Alessandro Piccinini – Intavolatura di liuto (Bologna: Giacomo Monti & Carlo Zenero), published posthumously by his son

== Classical music ==
- Heinrich Schütz – Kleine geistliche Konzerte (Small Sacred Concertos), part 2

== Opera ==
- Francesco Cavalli – Le nozze di Teti e di Peleo
- Benedetto Ferrari – L'Armida
- Virgilio Mazzocchi and Marco Marazzoli – Chi soffre, speri, libretto by Cardinal Giulio Rospigliosi (later Pope Clement IX), première of the revised version at the Teatro Barberini in Rome
- Claudio Monteverdi – Adone, premièred in Venice

== Births ==
- February 4 – Alessandro Melani, Italian composer (died 1703)
- April 3 – Alessandro Stradella, Italian composer (killed 1682)

== Deaths ==
- June 1 – Melchior Franck, composer (born 1579)
- July – Carlo Farina, violinist, conductor and composer (born c.1600) (plague)
- October 28 – Stefano Landi, composer and teacher (born 1587)
