= Il palazzo incantato =

"Allegory and subject of the action performed in music, entitled Lealtà con valore", title-page of the scenario booklet (not properly a libretto), Rome, 1642 (misprinted as 1662)

Il Palazzo incantato (The Enchanted Palace) or Il Palagio d’Atlante, overo La Guerriera Amante (The Palace of Atlantes, or The Warrior Woman in Love), or also Lealtà con valore (Loyalty with Bravery) is an opera in a prologue and three acts by the Italian composer Luigi Rossi. The libretto, by Giulio Rospigliosi, the future Pope Clement IX, is based on Ariosto's Orlando furioso. It was first performed in Rome in a lavish production at the Teatro delle Quattro Fontane (Palazzo Barberini) on 22 February 1642. Rossi was criticised for giving too much music to his friend, the castrato Marc'Antonio Pasqualini, who played Bradamante, at the expense of the other roles. Some of the highly complicated stage machinery failed to work during the performance. Revived by Opera Dijon in a January 2021 online production.

== Roles ==
Roles, voice types, premiere cast
Role	Voice type	Premiere cast, 22 February 1642
Pittura/Marfisa	soprano castrato (en travesti)	Pietro Paolo Visconti
Poesia/Fioralba (a woman)	soprano castrato (en travesti)	Michele Angelo Soldi
Musica/Olimpia	soprano castrato (en travesti)	Santi Casata
Magia/Prasildo	soprano castrato	Angelo Ferrotti
Atlante	alto (countertenor)	Lorenzo Sances
Orlando	tenor	Odoardo Ceccarelli
Angelica	soprano castrato (en travesti)	Loreto Vittori
Giant/Mandricardo	bass	Bartolomeo Nicolini
Bradamante	soprano castrato (en travesti)	Marc'Antonio Pasqualini
Ferraù	tenor	Giacomo Brilli
Sacripante	bass	Antonio Sarci
Ruggiero	tenor	Francesco Bianchi
Astolfo/Iroldo	tenor	Francesco Stilli
Alceste	alto (countertenor)	Mario Savioni
Gradasso	bass	Geronimo Navarra
Huntsman/False Ruggiero	tenor	Francesco Acquisti
Doralice	soprano castrato (en travesti)	Giovanni Paolo Selli
Fiordiligi	soprano castrato (en travesti)	Ludovico Camelano
Echo	soprano castrato	
Finardo (a dwarf)	soprano castrato	Zuradio

== Synopsis ==
The magician Atlante captures Christian and pagan knights and ladies in his enchanted palace of illusions. Orlando, Ferraù and Sacripante enter the palace in search of Angelica. Bradamante seeks Ruggiero and, finding him with Angelica, vows to kill him in a fit of jealous rage. But Atlante calms things by reminding Angelica of her love for Medoro. Atlante feels threatened when Astolfo arrives as the knight is immune to his magic. Atlante convinces his captives that Astolfo is the enemy. Meanwhile, Ruggiero has broken the spell. Atlante responds by disguising himself as Ruggiero but when he is faced with a duel with the real Ruggiero he is forced to admit defeat. The magic palace vanishes and the knights and ladies are freed.

== Notes ==
Sources

- Marina Vaccarini, "Palazzo incantato, Il, (Il Palagio d'Atlante, o vero La guerriera amante)", in Gelli, Piero & Poletti Filippo eds. (2007). Dizionario dell'Opera 2008, Milan: Baldini Castoldi Dalai, pp. 972–973. ISBN 978-88-6073-184-5 – via operamanager.com
