= Mario Savioni =

Italian composer

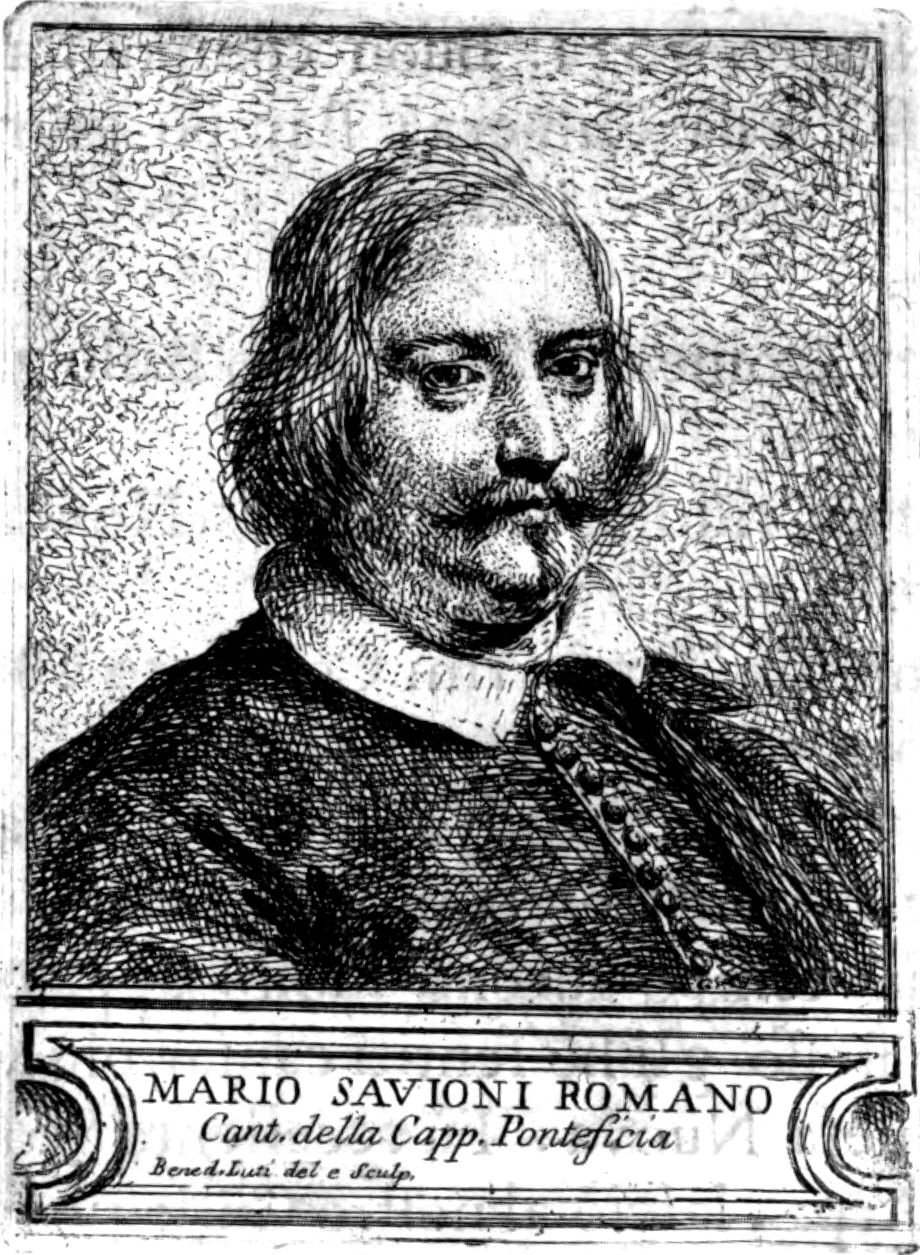
- Portrait of Mario Savioni, engraved by Benedetto Luti
- Born: 1608 in Rome
- Died: 22 April 1685

Mario Savioni (born 1608 in Rome, died 22 April 1685) was an Italian composer and a male alto of the Baroque era.

== Biography ==
Savioni receives training as a choirboy under the direction of Vincenzo Ugolini at San Luigi dei Francesi in Rome from 1617 to 1621. In 1621, he sang as a boy soprano at the Cappella Giulia of St. Peter's Basilica in the Vatican City, and later as an alto in 1626.

In September 1631, he returns to San Luigi dei Francesi to work with Ugolino as his assistant. At San Luigi, he received higher salary than the other singers.

From 1638, he worked with Orazio Benevoli, the Kapellmeister of Cappella Giulia. The collaboration ends in 1644, when he was appointed as the Kapellmeister at San Luigi. Savioni also worked closely with Luigi Rossi, the organist of San Luigi who is also a composer.

On 22 February 1642, Savioni sang the role of Alceste in Rossi's Il Palazzo incantato at Teatro delle Quattro Fontane (Palazzo Barberini). It was during this time that he became closed to Cardinal Antonio Barberini. Recognized by his talent, in the same year, Savioni was accepted into Papal chorus, and in 1659, was appointed as the maestro di cappella. He served there until 1668.

== Composition works ==
Savioni was one of the most prolific Italian cantata composers during baroque era. His works consist of large-scale cantata with several arias and recitatives. He composed about 180 cantatas, numerous motets, madrigals, Oratorio per ogni tempo and a spiritual opera in three acts, S. Agnese (libretto by Domenico Benigni), which was performed at the Palazzo Pamphilj in 1651.

=== Collections (selection) ===
- Concerti morali, e spirituali, a tre voci differenti (Rome, 1660)
- Madrigali morali, e spirituali, a cinque voci concertati (Rome, 1668)
- Madrigali morali, e Concerti, a tre voci differenti (Rome, 1672)
- Motetti a voce sola op. 4 (Rome, 1676)
