= Kacper Filip Szelążek =

Polish countertenor

- Born: 28 April 1984 (age 41); Ełk, Poland
- Occupation: Opera singer
- Years active: 2013

Kacper Filip Szelążek (born 28 April 1984 in Ełk, Poland) – Polish singer, countertenor.

== Life and career ==
He graduated in vocal studies in 2016 at the Fryderyk Chopin University of Music in Warsaw in the singing class of dr. hab. Artur Stefanowicz (previously he obtained the title of engineer at the Faculty of Electronics and Information Technology of the Warsaw University of Technology). He made his debut in 2013 in the Nerone part in the L'incoronazione di Poppea by Monterverdi, which he performed with great success at the Collegium Nobilium in Warsaw and in 2015 in the Salle Frank Martin Auditorium in Geneva. In 2013, as the best young musician of the year, he received a recording offer from Polish Radio (which was realised in the following form: Karol Szymanowski – Three passages to words by Kasprowicz, Witold Lutosławski – 5 songs to words by Kazimiera Iłłakowiczówna and arias of Sesto from Handel's Giulio Cesare) and to represent Poland at the Young Talents Competition EBU in Bratislava (International Forum of Young Performers New Talent). He performed, among others at: the National Philharmonic in Warsaw, Teatro Ristori in Verona, Teatro Thalia in Lisbon, the Concert Hall of the Pushkin Museum in Moscow, the Grand Theater–National Opera in Warsaw, the Lutosławski Concert Studio in Warsaw, the Warsaw Chamber Opera, the Dutch National Opera in Amsterdam. In his repertoire he also has oratorio parts, among others passions by J. S. Bach, cantatas by Handel, Porpora, Vivaldi and a large song repertoire, i.a. he is the only countertenor in the world that performs 3 poems to words by Kasprowicz by Karol Szymanowski.

== Awards and Distinction ==
- 2016 – he received the Carlo Maria Giulini award at the Stanisław Moniuszko International Vocal Competition in Warsaw.
- 2017 – he was awarded the Fryderyk Chopin University of Music Medal magna cum laude.

== Repertoire ==
- 2013 L'incoronazione di Poppea by Monteverdi, as Nerone – the production of the Opera Institute in Warsaw
- 2014 Agrippina by Handel, as Nerone, with Anna Radziejewska in the title role (the production of Dramma per Musica Association at the Royal Łazienki Museum in Warsaw) under the baton of Lilianna Stawarz
- 2015 Rodelinda by Handel, as Bertarido – the production of the Opera Institute in Warsaw
- 2016 Ariodante by Handel, title role, with Olga Pasiecznik as Guineverehe – the production of the Warsaw Chamber Opera
- 2017 Farnace by Vivaldi, as Gilade, as the first countertenor in the role – the production of Dramma per Musica Association of the III Baroque Operas Festival in Warsaw
- 2018 La morte d'Orfeo by Landi, as Bacco role – the production Dutch National Opera in Amsterdam opera conducted by Christophe Rousset and the Les Talens Lyriques orchestra.
- 2018 Giulio Cesare by Handel, title role, conducted by Paul Esswood – the production of the Grand Theatre, Poznań – Concert performance
- 2019 La finta pazza by Sacrati, as Eunuco, conducted by Leonardo García Alarcón and the Cappella Mediterranea – production of the Opéra de Dijon
- 2019 Orlando generoso by Steffani, as Medoro, Musical Directors Paul O'Dette & Stephen Stubbs and BEMF Orchestra – the production of the Boston Early Music Festival in Emerson Cutler Majestic Theatre Boston, MA
- 2019 Giulio Cesare by Handel, as Tolomeo, conducted by Christophe Rousset and the Les Talens Lyriques orchestra – concert performance in Theatre des Champs Elyses Paris France, Festival George Enescu 2019 Bucharest Romania in Romanian Athenaeum, Festival D'Ambronay 2019 France
- 2019 Agrippina by Handel, as Narciso, conducted by Christophe Rousset and the Les Talens Lyriques orchestra – concert performance in Romanian Athenaeum, Festival George Enescu 2019 Bucharest Romania,
- 2019 singing in the programme Himmelsmusik, conducted by Christina Pluhar and L’ARPEGGIATA orchestra in Pomeranian Philharmonic Bydgoszcz, Poland and Heinrich Schütz Musikfest in Dresden, Germany
- 2019 Carmina Burana by Orff, conducted by Lorenzo Passerini in Grand Theatre, Warsaw, Poland
- 2020 Carmina Burana by Orff, conducted by Dimitris Botinis in Filharmonia Łódzka im. Artura Rubinsteina in Łódź, Poland
- 2020 singing with Radziejewska in the program Farinelli contra Carestini, Festiwal Dramma per Musica ONLINE 2020, conducted by pl:Lilianna Stawarz and the Royal Baroque Ensemble, Warsaw, Poland
- 2020 Il palazzo incantato by Rossi in Prasildo/Le Nain, role, conducted by Leonardo García Alarcón and the Cappella Mediterranea – new production of the Opéra de Dijon, France
- 2021 Pergolesi's Stabat Mater with Hanna Sosnowska - conducted by Paweł Przytocki in Filharmonia Łódzka im. Artura Rubinsteina in Łódź, Poland
- 2021 Messiah by Handel, conducted by Kai Bumann in Pomeranian Philharmonic im. I. J. Paderewskiego, Bydgoszcz, Poland
- 2021 Agrippina by Handel, as Narciso, with Ann Hallenberg conducted by Francesco Corti and The Drottningholm Theatre Orchestra – Drottningholm Palace Theatre, Stockholm, Sweden
- 2021 Il palazzo incantato by Rossi, as Prasildo/Le Nain, conducted by Leonardo García Alarcón and the Cappella Mediterranea – Opéra national de Lorraine, Nancy, France
- 2021 Rodelinda by Handel, as Bertarido – the production of the Polska Opera Królewska, Warsaw, Poland, conducted Krzysztof Garstka and Capella Regia Polona
- 2022 L'incoronazione di Poppea by Monteverdi, as Nerone – the production of the Polska Opera Królewska, Warsaw, Poland, conducted Krzysztof Garstka and Capella Regia Polona
- 2022 J.S.Bach St John Passion, Choir & Orchestra of the Filharmonia Łódzka, conducted Andreas Scholl
- 2022 performance with Céline Scheen in the programme "Via Crucis" - L’Arpeggiata / Christina Pluhar in Elbphilharmonie, Hamburg, Germany
- 2022 La finta pazza by Sacrati, as Eunuco - conducted Leonardo García Alarcón, Het Concertgebouw, Amsterdam, Nederland
- 2022 Il Diluvio universale, Falvetti, Opera in concert, conducted Leonardo García Alarcón, Ludwigsburg, Germany
- 2022 Cantates de Bach, J.S.Bach, conducted Leonardo García Alarcón, Festival de Saint-Denis/Festival de Namur, Paris, France
- 2022 performance with Céline Scheen in the programme " Himmelsmusik" - L’Arpeggiata / Christina Pluhar, Corvey, Germany
- 2022 performance with Céline Scheen in the programme " Himmelsmusik" - L’Arpeggiata / Christina Pluhar, Bruges, Belgium
- 2023 Rodelinda by Handel, as Bertarido – the production of the Polska Opera Królewska, Warsaw, Poland, conducted Krzysztof Garstka and Capella Regia Polona
- 2023 L'incoronazione di Poppea by Monteverdi – the production Opera National du Rhin/ Oper Graz, conducted Raphael Pichon
- 2023 L'incoronazione di Poppea by Monteverdi – conducted Emiliano Gonzalez Toro, Theatre des Champs-Elyses, Paris, France
