= Chi soffre, speri =

Opera by Virgilio Mazzocchi

L'Egisto, ovvero Chi soffre speri ('Egisto, or Who suffers may hope') is a 1637 commedia musicale, a type of early Italian comic opera, in a prologue and three acts with music by Virgilio Mazzocchi (and, in its 1639 revision, Marco Marazzoli) and a libretto by Giulio Rospigliosi (the future Pope Clement IX), based on Giovanni Boccaccio's Il decamerone (Fifth day, ninth tale).

== Performance history ==
The opera was first performed on 12 February 1637 at the Palazzo Barberini in Rome with the title Il falcone or Chi soffre speri and presented at least five more times. A revised version, a collaboration with (and with intermedi composed by) Marco Marazzoli, was performed on 27 February 1639 at the nearby Teatro Barberini, with the title L'Egisto, ovvero Chi soffre speri, and repeated at least four times. The surviving scores are the revised version dating from 1639.

In 2007, Barbara Nestola reported there was a manuscript copy of the 1639 score in the Bibliothèque nationale de France. This finding is considered strong evidence that the Egisto performed at the Palais-Royal in Paris on 13 February 1646 at the instigation of Cardinal Mazarin was not, as long believed, Francesco Cavalli's opera L'Egisto, but actually Mazzocchi and Marazolli's L'Egisto, ovvero Chi soffre speri. Nestola suggests that the opera was performed a few days after Antonio Barberini arrived in Paris, after he and his family fled Rome subsequent to the death of Pope Urban VIII.

A modern revival was performed in 1970 under the title Il falcone ovvero Chi soffre speri at the Swedish Vadstena Academy. An audio excerpt was released on CD as part of an anthology of 17th-century operatic music.

== Genre ==
Chi soffre speri has often been described as the "first comic opera", and, although it is one the earliest operas with comic elements for which the music has survived, whether it is actually a comedy, rather than, for instance, a sentimental tragicomedy, has been disputed. The librettist added to the Boccaccio story an "allegorical framework", made explicit in the prologue with roles for Otio (“Idleness”), Voluttà ("Voluptuousness") and Virtù (“Virtue”). He also inserted into the opera and the intermedi stock, masked commedia dell'arte characters using dialect, such as the Neapolitan Coviello and the Bergamasque Zanni. Moschino, another commedia role, is unmasked. Comic servants appear in 20 of the 35 scenes of the opera. The lack of a chorus is also characteristic of the comic genre. In the 1639 revision, comic characters dominate the first two intermedi, particularly the second, La fiera di Farfa, which is essentially a scenic madrigal for ten voices that depicts shopkeepers selling their wares. During a dance near the end, a fracas breaks out which subsides as the market closes with the setting sun, a theatrical effect devised by Gian Lorenzo Bernini.

The term "commedia musicale" is a consequence of the influence of Spanish Golden Age comedy. Rospigliosi met Félix Lope de Vega when he was in Spain in the 1620s and later Pedro Calderón de la Barca when he returned to Spain for several years in the 1640s. It was under Rospigliosi's influence that Félix Lope de Vega wrote the libretto for the opera *La selva sin amor*, considered the first Spanish opera. It was also under Rospigliosi's influence that Pedro Calderón de la Barca began writing mythological comedies with significant musical elements, a style characteristic of the early operatic period in Florence and Venice.Furthermore, Rospigliosi translated Spanish comedies into Italian. Therefore, it is not surprising that he classifies his libretto as a *commedia musicale*, following Spanish usage.

== Roles ==
Role	Voice type
Egisto in love with Alvida	soprano castrato
Alvida a young widow	soprano castrato travesti
Silvano Egisto's friend	bass
Coviello Egisto's servant	tenor
Zanni Egisto's servant	tenor
Moschino Egisto's page	soprano castrato
Lucinda Alvida's servant, in love with Egisto	soprano castrato travesti
Rosilda	soprano castrato travesti

== Synopsis ==
The impoverished Egisto is in love with the young widow Alvida. She rejects his advances unless he destroys the things dearest to him: a tower he has inherited and his favourite falcon. He does so and Alvida is so impressed by the strength of his love that she marries him. In the ruins of the tower they find buried treasure and a heliotrope which cures Alvida's desperately ill son. In a sub-plot, Lucinda, who is in love with Egisto, disguises herself as a man. She comes near to killing herself when Egisto rejects her but in the end it turns out that she is Egisto's long-lost sister.

== See also ==
- La morte d'Orfeo, 1619 opera with comic elements

== Sources ==
- Brenac, Claude. "Il falcone/Chi soffre, speri/L'Egisto", Opéra Baroque website.
- Carter, Tim (1994). "The Seventeenth Century", pp. 1–46, in The Oxford Illustrated History of Opera, edited by Roger Parker. Oxford: Oxford University Press.
- Dixon, Graham (1993). "Virgilio Mazzocchi", p. 642, in The Viking Opera Guide, edited by Amanda Holden. London: Viking.
- Lewis, Susan Gail (1995). "Chi soffre speri" and the Influence of the Commedia dell'Arte on the Development of Roman Opera, thesis for The University of Arizona. ProQuest Dissertations Express, publication ID: 1376044 (digital copy available).
- Murata, Margaret (1980). Operas for the Papal Court with Texts by Giulio Rospigliosi, two volumes, dissertation for The University of Chicago. ProQuest Dissertations Express, publication ID: T-25401 (digital copy of vols 1 & 2 available).
- Murata, Margaret (1992). "Chi soffre speri [L’Egisto, ovvero Chi soffre speri (‘Egisto, or Who Suffers May Hope’)]", vol. 1, pp. 847–849, in The New Grove Dictionary of Opera, four volumes, edited by Stanley Sadie. London: Macmillan. ISBN 9781561592289.
- Nestola, Barbara (2007). "L'Egisto fantasma di Cavalli: nuova luce sulla rappresentazione parigina dell'Egisto ovvero Chi soffre speri di Mazzocchi e Marazzoli (1646)". Recercare, vol. 19, no. 1/2 (2007), pp. 125–146. JSTOR 41701476.
- V., M. "Chi soffre speri", Dizinario dell'Opera, Del Teatro website (in Italian).
- Wilbourne, Emily (2016). Seventeenth-Century Opera and the Sound of the Commedia dell'Arte. Chicago and London: The University of Chicago Press. ISBN 9780226401577.
- Witzenmann, Wolfgang (2001). "Mazzocchi, Virgilio" in Grove Music Online.
