= Egisto =

Egisto can refer to:

- Aegisthus, figure in Greek mythology
- L'Egisto, 1643 opera by Francesco Cavalli
- Chi soffre, speri (also known as L'Egisto), 1637 opera by Virgilio Mazzocchi
- 22401 Egisto, a minor planet
