= Pope Clement IX =

Head of the Catholic Church from 1667 to 1669

- Bishop of Rome
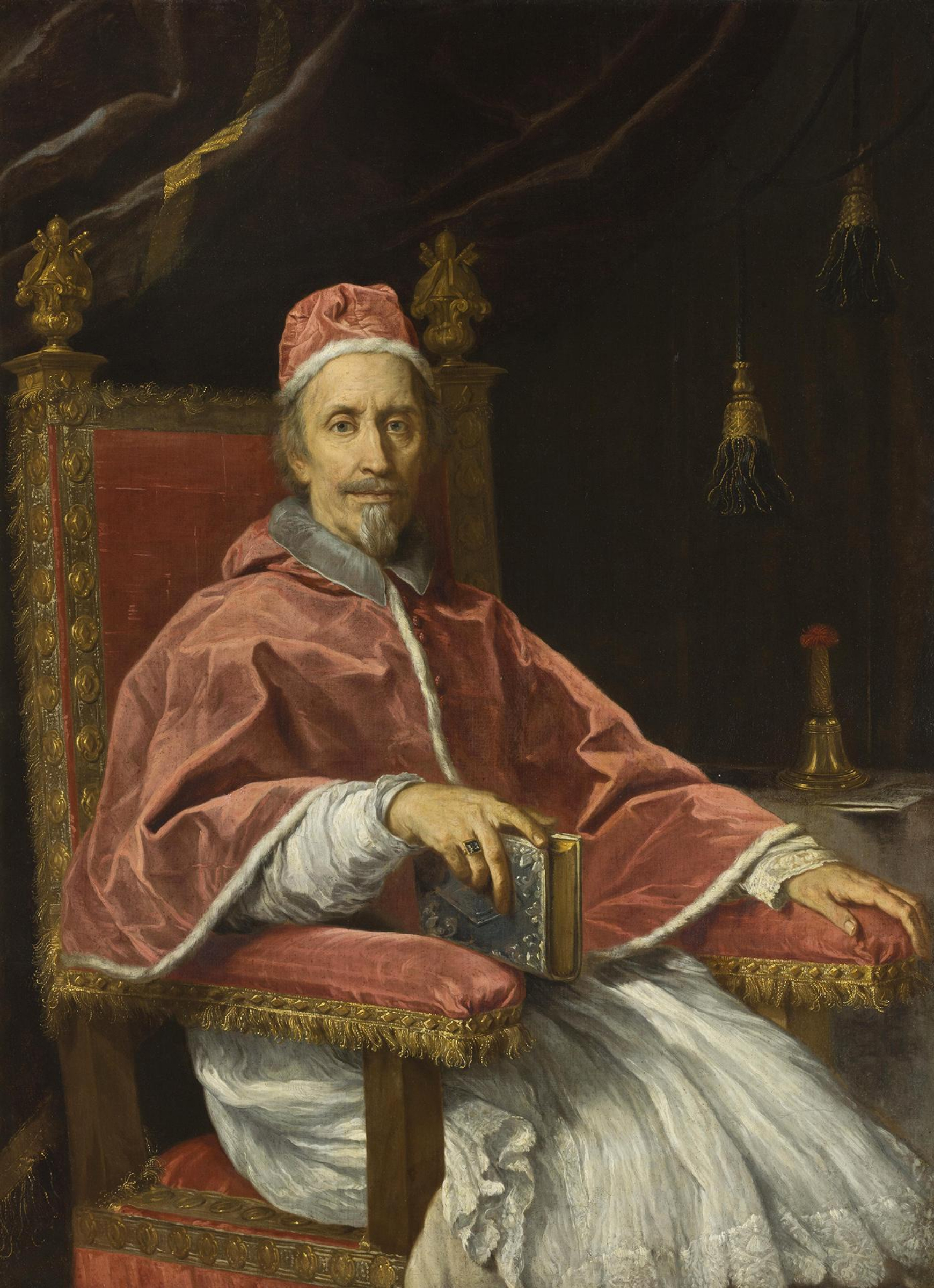
- Portrait by Carlo Maratta, 1669
- Church: Catholic Church
- Papacy began: 20 June 1667
- Papacy ended: 9 December 1669
- Predecessor: Alexander VII
- Successor: Clement X
- Previous posts: Referendary of the Apostolic Signatura (1632–1636); Secretary of the Sacred Congregation of Rites (1632–1636); Apostolic Nuncio to Spain (1644–1653); Titular Archbishop of Tarsus (1644–1667); Official of the Roman Curia (1653–1655); Cardinal Secretary of State (1655–1667); Governor of Rome (1655); Cardinal-Priest of San Sisto Vecchio (1657–1667)

Orders
- Consecration: 29 March 1644 by Antonio Marcello Barberini
- Created cardinal: 9 April 1657 by Alexander VII

Personal details
- Born: Giulio Rospigliosi; 28 January 1600 Pistoia, Grand Duchy of Tuscany
- Died: 9 December 1669 (aged 69) Rome, Papal States
- Motto: Aliis non sibi Clemens ("Clement to others, not to himself")

- Coat of arms

Pope Clement IX (Latin: Clemens IX; Italian: Clemente IX; 28 January 1600 – 9 December 1669), born Giulio Rospigliosi, was head of the Catholic Church and ruler of the Papal States from 20 June 1667 to his death in December 1669.

Giulio Rospigliosi was born into the noble Rospigliosi family in 1600 and studied at the Seminario Romano and the University of Pisa. He held various positions in the Church, including Titular Archbishop of Tarsus and Apostolic Nuncio to Spain. As a man of letters, he wrote poetry, dramas, and libretti, and was a patron of the artist Nicolas Poussin.

Appointed as a cardinal by Pope Alexander VII, Rospigliosi was elected as Pope Clement IX in 1667. His pontificate was marked by mediation during European wars, and his popularity in Rome stemmed from his charity, humility, and refusal to advance his family's wealth. He beatified Rose of Lima and canonized Mary Magdalene de' Pazzi and Peter of Alcántara, while also creating 12 new cardinals.

Clement IX was a patron of the arts, commissioning works from Gian Lorenzo Bernini and opening the first public opera house in Rome. He attempted to strengthen Venetian defenses against the Turks in Crete, but was unsuccessful in gaining wider support. In 1669, after learning about the Venetian fortress of Candia surrendering to the Turks, Clement IX fell ill and died.

== Biography ==
=== Early life and education ===
Giulio Rospigliosi was born in 1600 to the Rospigliosi family, a noble family of Pistoia in the Grand Duchy of Tuscany to Giacomo and Caterina Rospigliosi. He studied at the Seminario Romano and later at the University of Pisa as a pupil of the Jesuits, receiving doctorates in theology, philosophy and both canon and civil law in 1623. After receiving his doctorates, he taught theology there as a professor from 1623 to 1625.

=== Episcopate and cardinalate ===
Later Rospigliosi worked closely with Pope Urban VIII (1623–1644) where he worked in the diplomatic corps as the Referendary of the Apostolic Signatura. He was appointed as the Titular Archbishop of Tarsus in 1644 and later received episcopal consecration in the Vatican. Rospigliosi also served as the Apostolic Nuncio to Spain from 1644 until 1653 when he decided to retire from that post. He lived in retirement throughout the pontificate of Pope Innocent X who disliked and distanced himself from those associated with his predecessor. He was also made vicar of Santa Maria Maggiore in Rome.

Rospigliosi was an accomplished man of letters who wrote poetry, dramas and libretti, as well as what may be the first comic opera, namely his 1637 libretto Chi soffre, speri. He was also a patron of Nicolas Poussin, commissioning A Dance to the Music of Time from him and dictating its iconography.

Pope Alexander VII appointed him to the cardinalate in 1657 as the Cardinal-Priest of San Sisto Vecchio and was also appointed as the Cardinal Secretary of State in 1655 which he held until 1667.

== Pontificate ==
=== Papal election ===
Papal styles of Pope Clement IX
- Reference style: His Holiness
- Spoken style: Your Holiness
- Religious style: Holy Father
- Posthumous style: None

Pope Alexander VII died in 1667 and a conclave to choose his successor was called. King Louis XIV of France instructed the French faction to turn their support to Rospigliosi and believed also that he would appease the Spanish faction of Charles II due to the fact that he had once been the Apostolic Nuncio to Spain. On 20 June 1667, he was elected as pontiff and took the pontifical name of "Clement IX".

The new pope was crowned on 26 June 1667 by the protodeacon, Cardinal Rinaldo d'Este. He later took possession of the Basilica of Saint John Lateran on 3 July 1667.

When asked about Rospigliosi becoming pope, Cardinal Francesco Albizzi said: "Urban turned the Holy See into a bank; Innocent into a brothel; Alexander into a tavern; this one will make a playhouse of it". Albizzi also alluded to Rospigliosi's passion for music and said, "He will emasculate the Sacred College by giving the hat to all the castrated singers in Europe!" When elected, Rospigliosi received all but two votes since he voted for another while Cardinal Neri Corsini voted for Cardinal Flavio Chigi.

=== Actions ===
Nothing remarkable occurred under Clement IX's short administration beyond the temporary adjustment of the disputes between the Holy See and those prelates of the Gallican Church who had refused to join in condemning the writings of Jansen. He was mediator during the 1668 peace of Aachen, in the wars between France, Spain, England and the Netherlands.

He was popular with the people of Rome, not so much for his erudition and application to business as for his extreme charity and his affability towards great and small. He increased the goodwill of his subjects by buying off the monopolist who had secured the "macinato", or privilege of selling grain, and as his predecessor had collected the money for the purpose, Clement IX had the decree published in the name of Alexander VII. Two days each week, he occupied a confessional in St. Peter's Basilica and heard anyone who wished to confess to him. He frequently visited the hospitals and was lavish in his alms to the poor. In an age of nepotism, he did little or nothing to advance or enrich his family. In his aversion to notoriety, he refused to permit his name to be placed on the buildings erected during his reign.

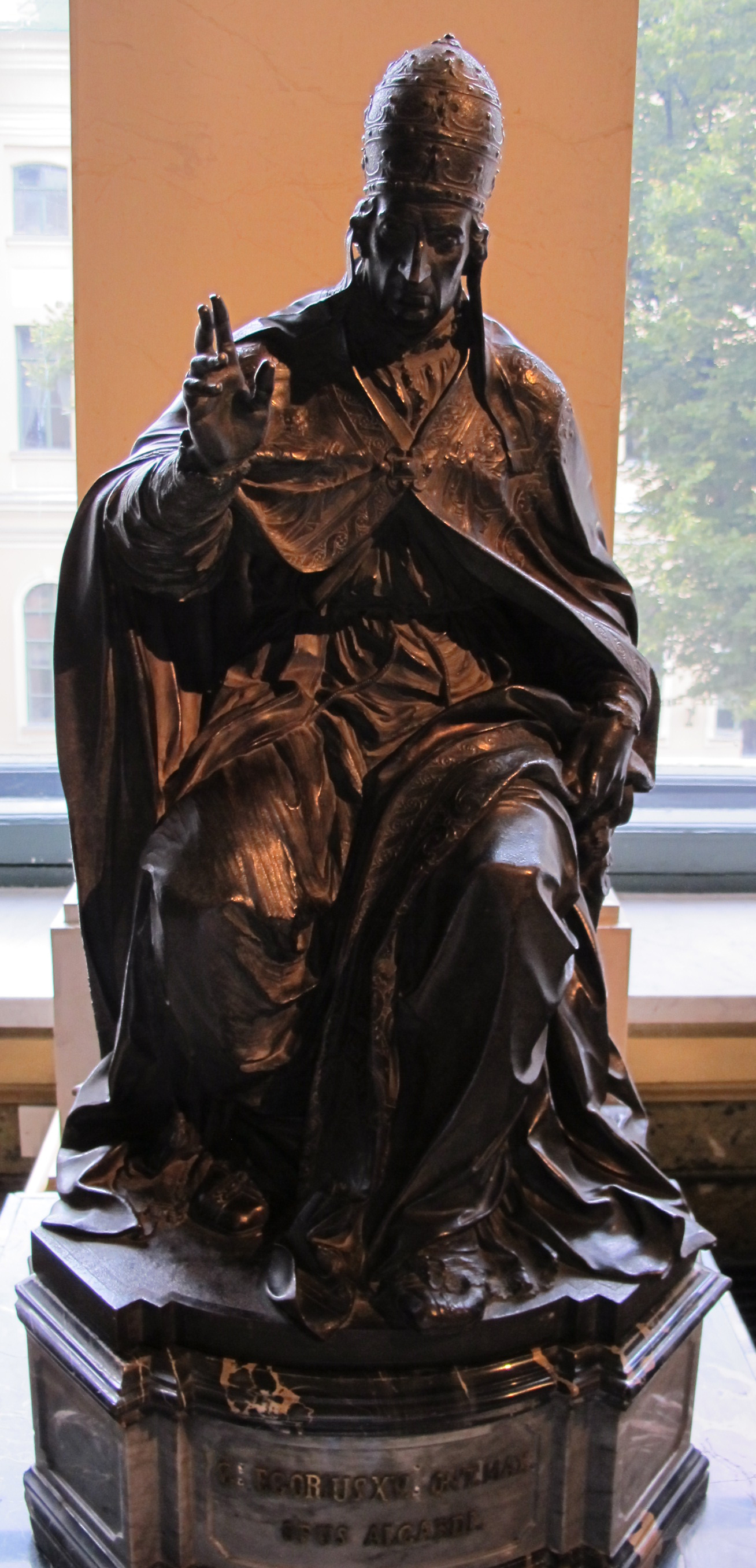
Statue of Clement IX

=== Other actions ===
Clement IX confirmed the cultus of Margaret of Savoy on 9 October 1669. He also beatified Rose of Lima on 15 April 1668. On 28 April 1668, he canonized Magdalena de Pazzi and Peter of Alcántara.

He elevated 12 new cardinals in three consistories; this included Emilio Bonaventura Altieri who would succeed him as Pope Clement X.

=== Art reforms ===
As pope, Clement IX continued his interest in the arts. He embellished the city of Rome with famous works commissioned from Gian Lorenzo Bernini, including the angels of Ponte Sant'Angelo and the colonnade of Saint Peter's Basilica. Somewhat unusually for Popes of the era, Clement IX did not have his name displayed on monuments he built. For the Carnival celebrations of 1668, commissioned Antonio Maria Abbatini of the Sistine Chapel Choir to set to music his free Italian translation of a Spanish religious drama La Baltasara, the production had sets designed by Bernini.

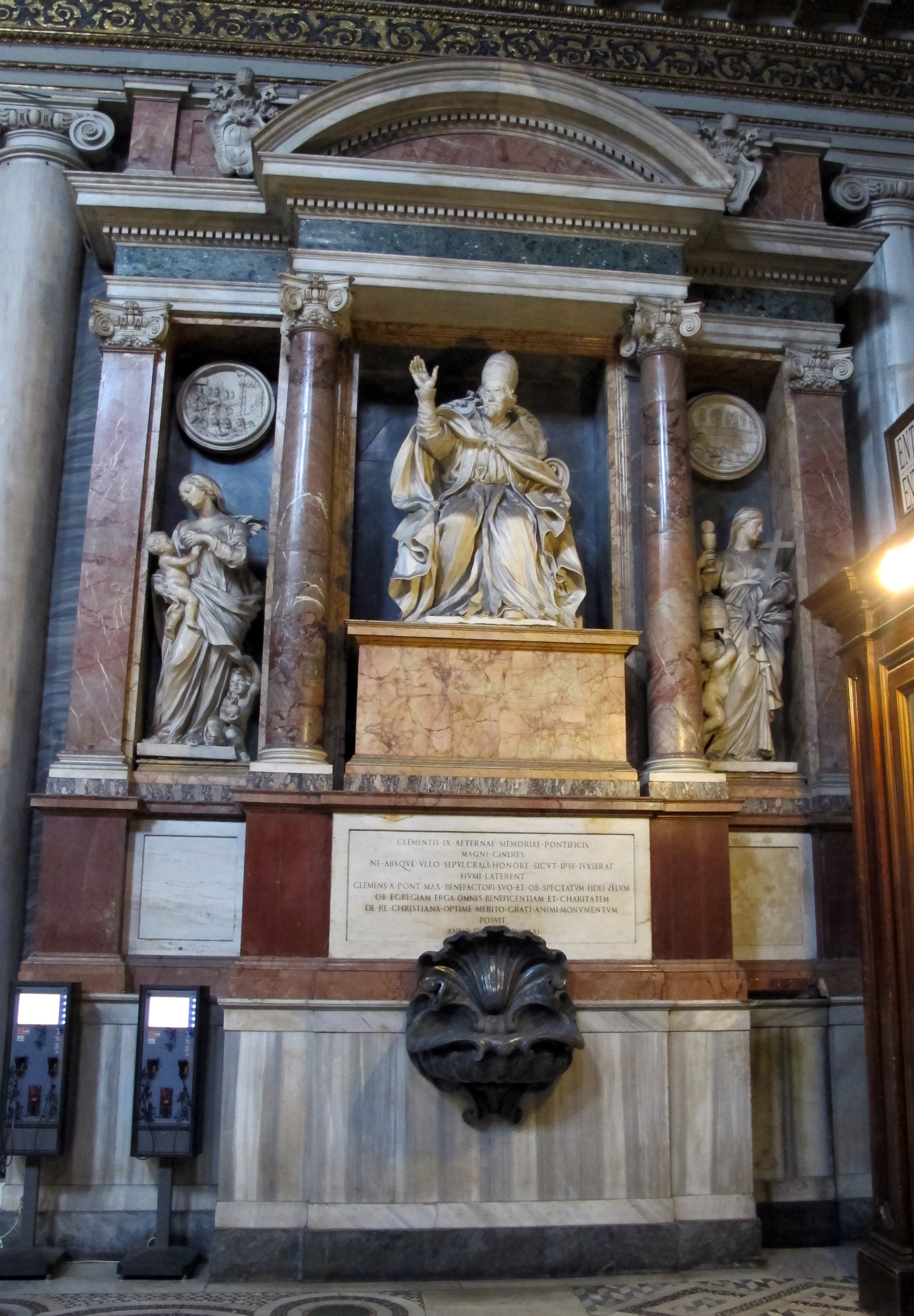
The tomb of Clement IX

=== Defence against the Turks ===
Clement IX worked to strengthen Venetian defences against the Turks on the island of Crete. However, he was unable to get wider support for this cause. At the end of October 1669, Clement IX fell ill after receiving news that the Venetian fortress of Candia in Crete had surrendered to the Turks.

== Death and burial ==
Clement IX was seriously ill throughout the autumn in 1669 with a hernia and kidney stones. Despite his illness and his anxiety over the Turkish advances in Crete, he travelled on a pilgrimage to the seven Roman basilicas, however, that night, he had a severe apoplexy. On 29 November, just ten days before he died, he named seven new cardinals and announced one whom he had reserved "in pectore". However, the dying pope intended to create a "faction" for his nephew with which to use in the next conclave to defend his policies. Clement IX died of a stroke on 9 December, and it is believed this was perhaps brought on by learning of the defeat and expulsion of the Venetians from Crete.

Following his death, the Florentine agent in Rome, writing to Grand Duke Ferdinando II de' Medici a few days later, accuses the late Clement IX of having hidden the fact that he was epileptic, which would have, according to the canon law in place at the time, disqualified him from exercising any ecclesiastical functions, however, this has never been proven.

His successor, Pope Clement X (r. 1670–1676), built him an ornate tomb in the basilica of Santa Maria Maggiore; he was the last pope interred there until the death and burial of Pope Francis in 2025.

== Artistic works ==
=== Libretti ===
- for Giovanni Girolamo Kapsperger: I Pastori di Betlemme (1630)
- for Stefano Landi: Il Sant'Alessio (1631–2, 1634)
- for Michele Angelo Rossi: Erminia sul Giordano (1633)
- for (composer unknown): I Santi Didimo e Teodora (1635, 1636)
- for Marco Marazzoli and Virgilio Mazzocchi: Chi Soffre, Speri (1637, 1639)
- for Aurelio Aureli: La Sincerità Trionfante (1638, 1639)
- for Virgilio Mazzocchi: Il San Bonifazio (1638, 1639)
- for Virgilio Mazzocchi: La Genoinda (1641)
- for Luigi Rossi: Il Palazzo Incantato (1642)
- for Virgilio Mazzocchi: Il Sant'Eustachio (1643)
- for Antonio Maria Abbatini and Marco Marazzoli: Dal Male Il Bene (1654, 1656)
- for Marco Marazzoli: Le Armi e Gli Amori (1656)
- for Antonio Maria Abbatini: La Comica del Cielo (1668)

== See also ==
- Cardinals created by Clement IX

== Sources ==
- Kelly, John Norman Davidson; Walsh, Michael J. (2010). "Clement IX". A Dictionary of Popes. Oxford University Press. pp. 288–289. ISBN 978-0-19-929581-4.
- Rendina, Claudio (1993). I papi. Storia e segreti. Rome: Newton & Compton.
- Murata, Margaret (1981). Operas for the Papal Court, 1631–1668. UMI Research Press.

Political offices
Preceded by Fabio Chigi	Cardinal Secretary of State; 1655–1667	Succeeded by Decio Azzolini
Catholic Church titles
Preceded by Alexander VII	Pope; 20 June 1667 – 9 December 1669	Succeeded by Clement X
