= Il Sant'Alessio =

Opera in three acts composed by Stefano Landi

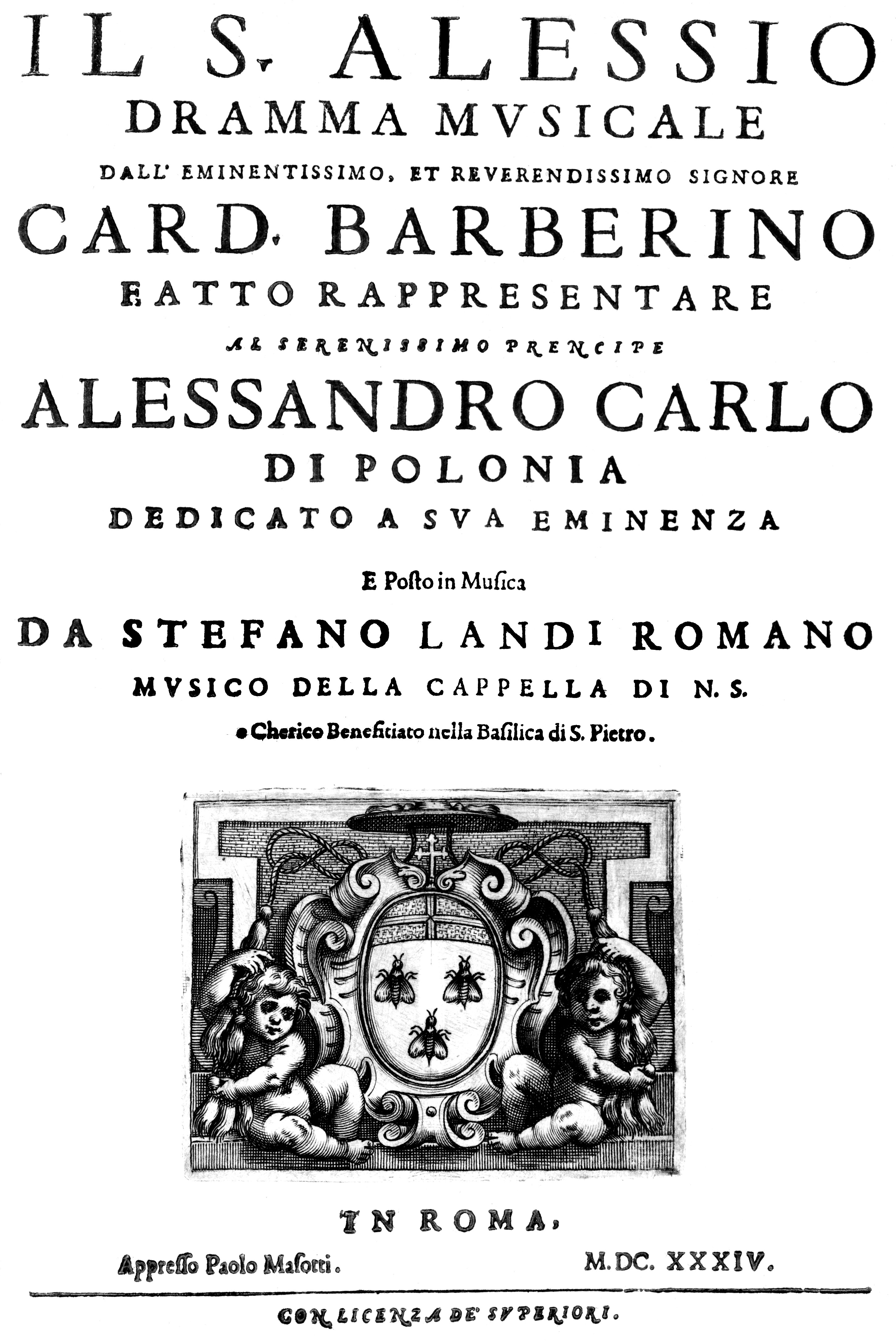

Il Sant'Alessio (Saint Alexius) is an opera in three acts composed by Stefano Landi in 1631 with a libretto by Giulio Rospigliosi (the future Pope Clement IX). Its first performance was probably in February 1632.

Sant'Alessio was the first opera to be written on a historical subject. It describes the inner life of fifth-century Saint Alexis. The work broke new ground with a psychological characterization of a type that was new to opera. It also contains interspersed comic scenes that are anachronistically drawn from the contemporary life of Rome in the 17th century.

== Musical context ==
Landi's religious context, in keeping with the Counter-Reformation spirit of Jesuit dramas, marks a new departure in the theatre in Rome, combining antiquarian interests in ancient drama with modern musical conceptions of recitative, ensembles and occasional arias. Musically, the work has considerable variety, with elements of comedy and tragedy, and went some way towards establishing specifically Christian opera in a Rome that remained musically conservative. Singers for the opera, all male, were recruited from the Papal Chapel and included castrati. The Barberinis, noted patrons of the arts, owed their current influence to the Barberini Pope Urban VIII. The librettist, Giulio Rospigliosi, became Pope Clement IX in 1667.

The part of Sant'Alessio lies extremely high and was meant to be sung by a castrato. The accompanying orchestra is up-to-date, dispensing with the archaic viols and using violins, cellos, harps, lutes, theorbos, and harpsichords. The opera includes introductory canzonas which function as overtures; indeed they are the first overtures in the history of opera. Dances and comic sections mix with serious arias, recitatives, and even a madrigalian lament, for an overall dramatic variety which was extremely effective, as attested by the frequent performances of the opera at the time. Sant'Alessio was one of the first staged dramatic works successfully to mix both the monodic and polyphonic styles.

== Performance history ==
The exact date of the first performance is stated differently in the literature. It might have been 17 February 1632, 18 February 1632, 21 February 1632 or 23 February 1632. Apparently a production for 2 March 1631 had been prepared, but no historical sources confirm an actual performance on that date. Landi seems to have revised the work before the performance of 1632. The place of the performance is also unsure. It might have been the Palazzo Barberini ai Giubbonari or the Palazzo Barberini alle Quattro Fontane, Rome. A revised version was performed in 1634.

An ambitious all-male production of the piece, directed by baroque theatre specialist Benjamin Lazar and conducted by William Christie, premiered in Caen, Normandy on October 16, 2007. This acclaimed production involved eight countertenors, including Philippe Jaroussky as Sant'Alessio and Max Emanuel Cenčić as Sposa. One performance was broadcast in full as a live video webcast by France 3 on October 18, 2007.

== Roles ==
| Role | Voice Type | Premiere Cast, February 1632 |
|---|---|---|
| Sant'Alessio (Saint Alexius) | soprano | most probably Angelo Ferrotti (castrato) |
| Sposa (Alexius's wife) | soprano | Marc'Antonio Pasqualini (castrato en travesti) |
| Curzio (Euphemianus's page) | soprano | probably sung by a boy |
| Angelo (an angel) | soprano | sung by a castrato |
| Roma (Rome) | soprano | Paolo Cipriani (boy soprano) |
| Religione (Religion) | soprano | Paolo Cipriani (boy soprano) |
| Marzio (Euphemianus's page) | soprano | probably sung by a boy |
| Nuntio (a messenger) | contralto | sung by a castrato |
| Madre (Alexius's mother) | soprano | sung by a castrato en travesti |
| Nutrice (nurse to Alexius's wife) | soprano | sung by a castrato en travesti |
| Adrasto (Adrastus, friend of Euphemianus) | contralto | Girolamo Zampetti (castrato) |
| Eufemiano (Euphemianus, Alexius's father) | tenor | Francesco Bianchi |
| Demonio (Satan) | bass | most probably Bartolomeo Nicolini |
| Uno del Coro (a member of the chorus) | bass | Geronimo Navarra |

== Brief synopsis ==
The story of the opera begins with Saint Alexius, who has embraced a life of holy poverty, returning from the Holy Land as a beggar to his father's house in Rome. He keeps his identity a secret, even when his wife and mother decide to travel in search of him. He resists the temptations offered by the Devil, with the help of an angel. He dies in the poverty he has chosen, under the steps of his father's house, his identity revealed in a letter he holds as he dies.

== Recording ==
- Landi: Il Sant'Alessio: Patricia Petibon (Sant'Alessio), Sophie Marin-Degor (sposa), Mhairi Lawson (Curzio), Stephanie Revidat (angelo), Maryseult Wieczorek (Religione), Steve Dugardin (Marzio), Armand Gavriilidès (nunzio), Cecile Eloir (madre), Katalin Karolyi (nutrice), Christopher Josey (Adrasto), Nicolas Rivenq (Eufemiano), Clive Bayley (demonio), Bertrand Bontoux (uno del coro); Les Arts florissants; Conductor William Christie. Originally recorded 1996. Label: Warner Classics
