= List of theatres and opera houses in Rome =

This is an alphabetical list of past and current theatres and opera houses in Rome, Italy.

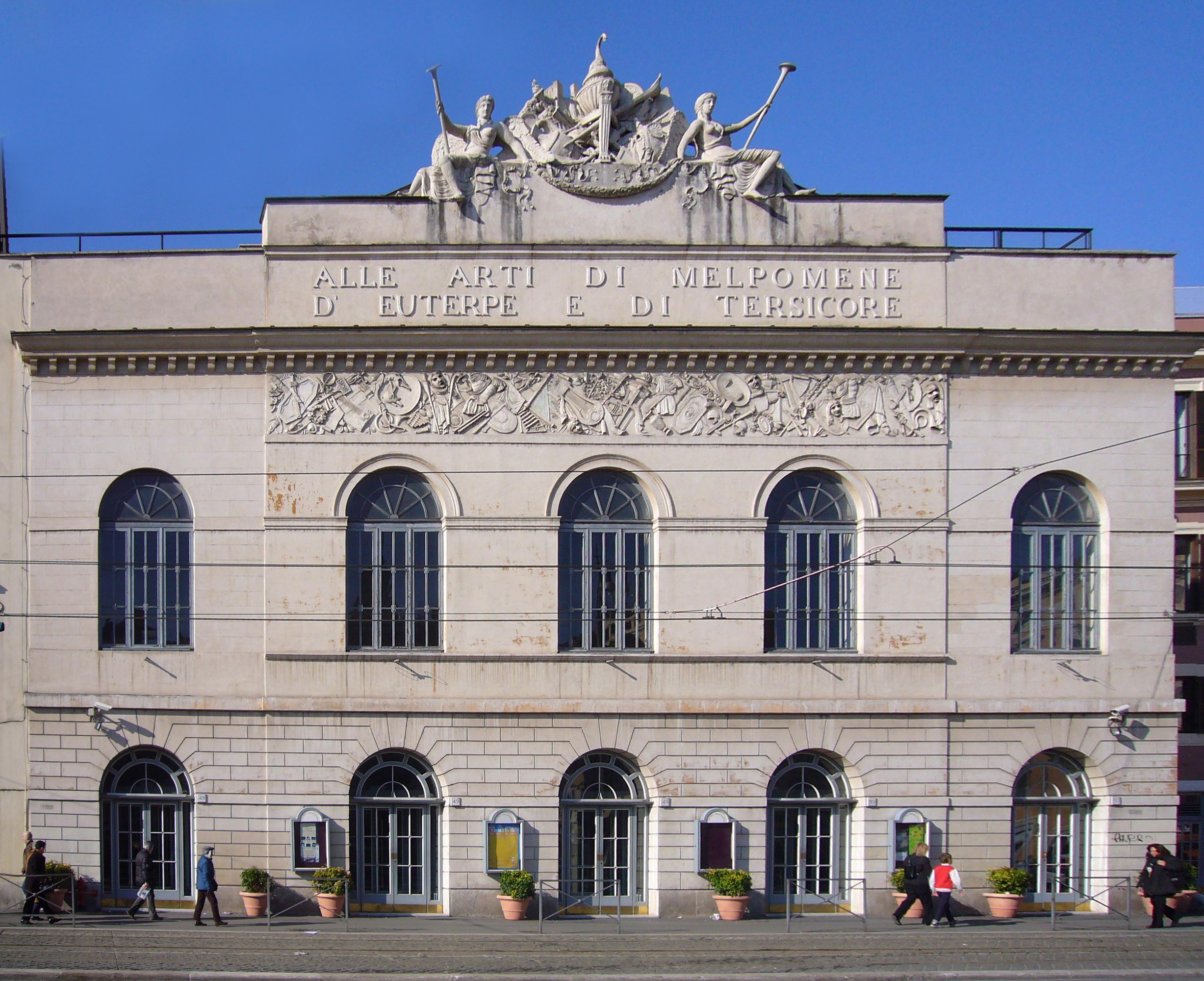
Exterior of the Teatro Argentina

- National Dramatic Theatre (or National Theatre) was a theatre which was demolished in 1934 during the redevelopment of the Via Nazionale.
- Teatro Argentina is an opera house and theatre located in the Largo di Torre Argentina. It is one of the oldest theatres in Rome, and was inaugurated on January 31, 1732 with Berenice by Domenico Sarro. It was commissioned by the Sforza Cesarini family and designed by the architect Gerolamo Theodoli with the auditorium laid out in the traditional horseshoe shape. The inside of the theatre was built out of wood with six levels of boxes characterizing the design, and has been restored many times. In the 19th century, the premieres of many notable operas took place in the theatre. They include Gioachino Rossini's The Barber of Seville in 1816, and Giuseppe Verdi's I due Foscari in 1844 and La battaglia di Legnano in 1849.
- Teatro Brancaccio is a 1,300-seat theatre and cinema located in the Esquilino zone, that has also been used as a cinema. Inaugurated in 1916, it was restored and re-opened in 1978.
- Teatro Capranica is a former opera house located in the Colonna rione. Originally built in 1679, it saw the premieres of many Baroque operas. It closed definitively as a theatre in 1881 and it now serves as a conference and event venue.
- Teatro dell'Opera di Roma (Rome Opera House) is an opera house located on the Piazza Beniamino Gigli. Originally opened in November 1880 as a 2,212 seat Costanzi Theatre, it has been renamed at several occasions and has undergone several modifications and improvements. The present house seats 1,600.
- Teatro delle Quattro Fontane was an opera theatre inaugurated in 1632 and located near the Piazza Barberini. It later became a prose theatre.
- Teatro Quirino is a theatre for plays and musicals located on Via delle Vergini in the Trevi district of Rome. Originally built in 1871 as a marionette theatre, it has been significantly rebuilt and remodelled over the years. In the late 19th and early 20th centuries, it also hosted opera, operetta, and ballet.
- Teatro Sistina is a theatre located on Via Sistina between Piazza Barberini and Trinità dei Monti. It was originally built as a cinema in 1949 but is now primarily used for theatre and cabaret performances.
- Teatro Valle (literally Valley Theater) is a theatre and former opera house located on the Via del Teatro Valle in the area bounded by the Pantheon, Piazza Navona, Campo dei Fiori and the Senate. Commissioned by the Capranica family, the architect Tommaso Morelli designed the theatre which was built in 1726. It was inaugurated with the staging of the tragedy Matilde by Simon Falconio Pratoli. After hosting a season of opera seria in 1730, the Valle was limited through much of the latter half of the 18th century to staging prose dramas as well as a mix of intermezzos and comic operas, particularly those of Galuppi, Piccinni, Anfossi, Sacchini, Paisiello, Guglielmi, and Cimarosa. It was the only theatre in Rome in 1782, and after 1786, which offered both spring and autumn seasons of opera as well a season during Carnival.

== See also ==
*List of tourist attractions in Rome
