= Cardinals created by Clement IX =

Catholic appointments from 1667 to 1669

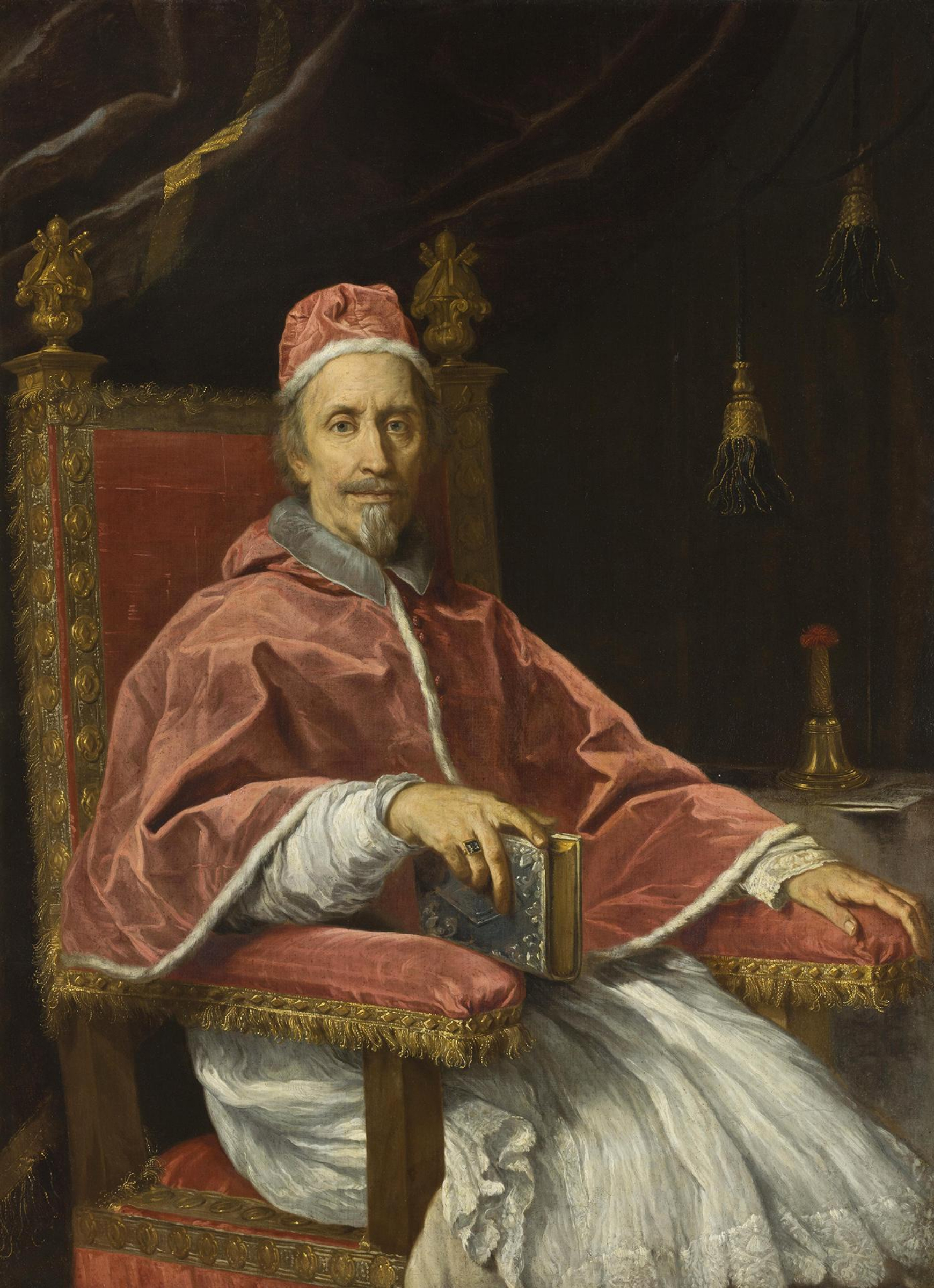
Pope Clement IX

Pope Clement IX (r. 1667–1669) created 12 cardinals in three consistories:

== Consistory of 12 December 1667 ==
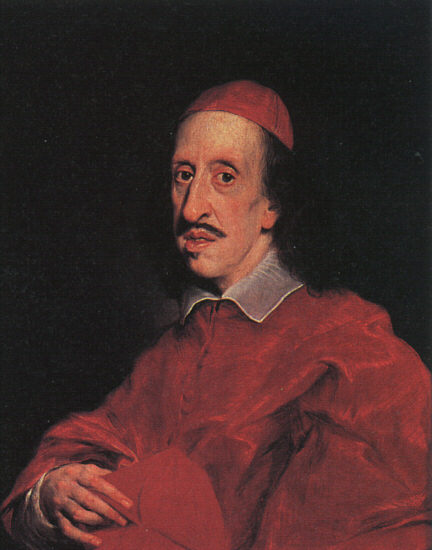
Leopoldo de' Medici (1617-75), made a cardinal on 12 December 1667

- Giacomo Rospigliosi, nephew of the Pope– cardinal-priest of S. Sisto (received the title on 30 January 1668), then cardinal-priest of SS. Giovanni e Paolo (16 May 1672), † 2 February 1684
- Leopoldo de' Medici, brother of grand duke of Tuscany – cardinal-deacon of SS. Cosma e Damiano (received the title on 9 April 1668), then cardinal-deacon of S. Maria in Cosmedin (14 May 1670), † 10 November 1675
- Sigismondo Chigi, O.S.Io.Hieros., grand prior of Rome – cardinal-deacon of S. Maria in Domnica (received the title on 30 January 1668), then cardinal-deacon of S. Giorgio in Velabro (19 May 1670), † 30 April 1678

== Consistory of 5 August 1669 ==
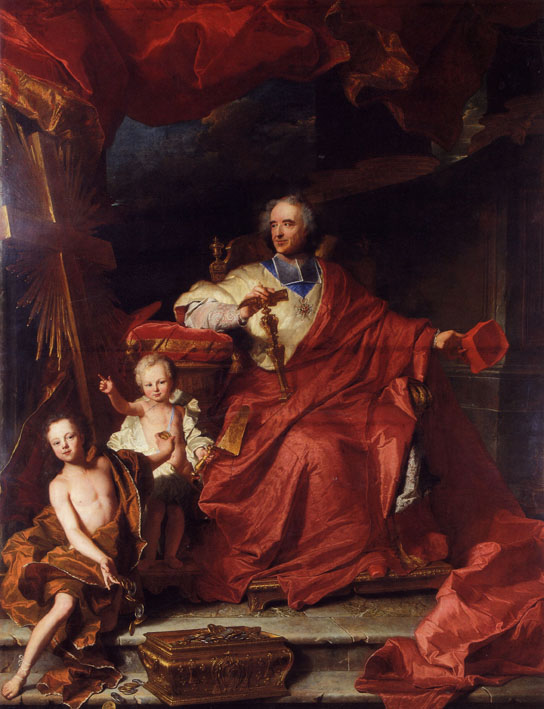
Emmanuel Théodose de La Tour d'Auvergne (1643-1715), made a cardinal on 5 August 1669

All the new cardinals received the titles on 19 May 1670.

- Emmanuel Théodose de la Tour d'Auvergne de Bouillon – cardinal-priest of S. Giovanni a Porta Latina, then cardinal-priest of S. Pietro in Vincoli (19 October 1676), cardinal-bishop of Albano (19 October 1689), cardinal-bishop of Porto e S. Rufina (21 July 1698), cardinal-bishop of Ostia e Velletri (15 December 1700), † 2 March 1715
- Luis Manuel Fernández de Portocarrero-Bocanegra y Moscoso-Osorio, dean of the cathedral chapter of Toledo ( in pectore, published on 29 November 1669) – cardinal-priest of S. Sabina, then cardinal-bishop of Palestrina (27 January 1698), † 14 September 1709

== Consistory of 29 November 1669 ==
Giovanni Bona (1609-74), made a cardinal on 29 November 1669

All the new cardinals received the titles on 19 May 1670, except of Emilio Altieri, who on 29 April 1670 became Pope Clement X.

- Francesco Nerli (seniore), archbishop of Florence – cardinal-priest of S. Bartolomeo all'Isola, † 6 November 1670
- Emilio Bonaventura Altieri, prefect of the Pontifical Household – cardinal-priest without the title, on 29 April 1670 became Pope Clement X, † 22 July 1676
- Carlo Cerri, dean of the Sacred Roman Rota – cardinal-deacon of S. Adriano, † 14 May 1690
- Lazzaro Pallavicino – cardinal-deacon of S. Maria in Aquiro, then cardinal-priest of S. Balbina (8 November 1677), † 21 April 1680
- Giovanni Bona, O.Cist. – cardinal-priest of S. Bernardo alle Terme, † 28 October 1674
- Nicolò Acciaioli, auditor general of the Apostolic Chamber – cardinal-deacon of SS. Cosma e Damiano, then cardinal-deacon of S. Maria in Via Lata (19 October 1689), cardinal-priest of S. Callisto (28 November 1689), cardinal-bishop of Frascati (28 September 1693), cardinal-bishop of Porto e S. Rufina (15 December 1700), cardinal-bishop of Ostia e Velletri (18 March 1715), † 23 February 1719
- Buonaccorso Buonaccorsi, general treasurer – cardinal-deacon of S. Maria della Scala, † 18 April 1678
