= Marc'Antonio Pasqualini =

Italian opera singer (1614–1691)

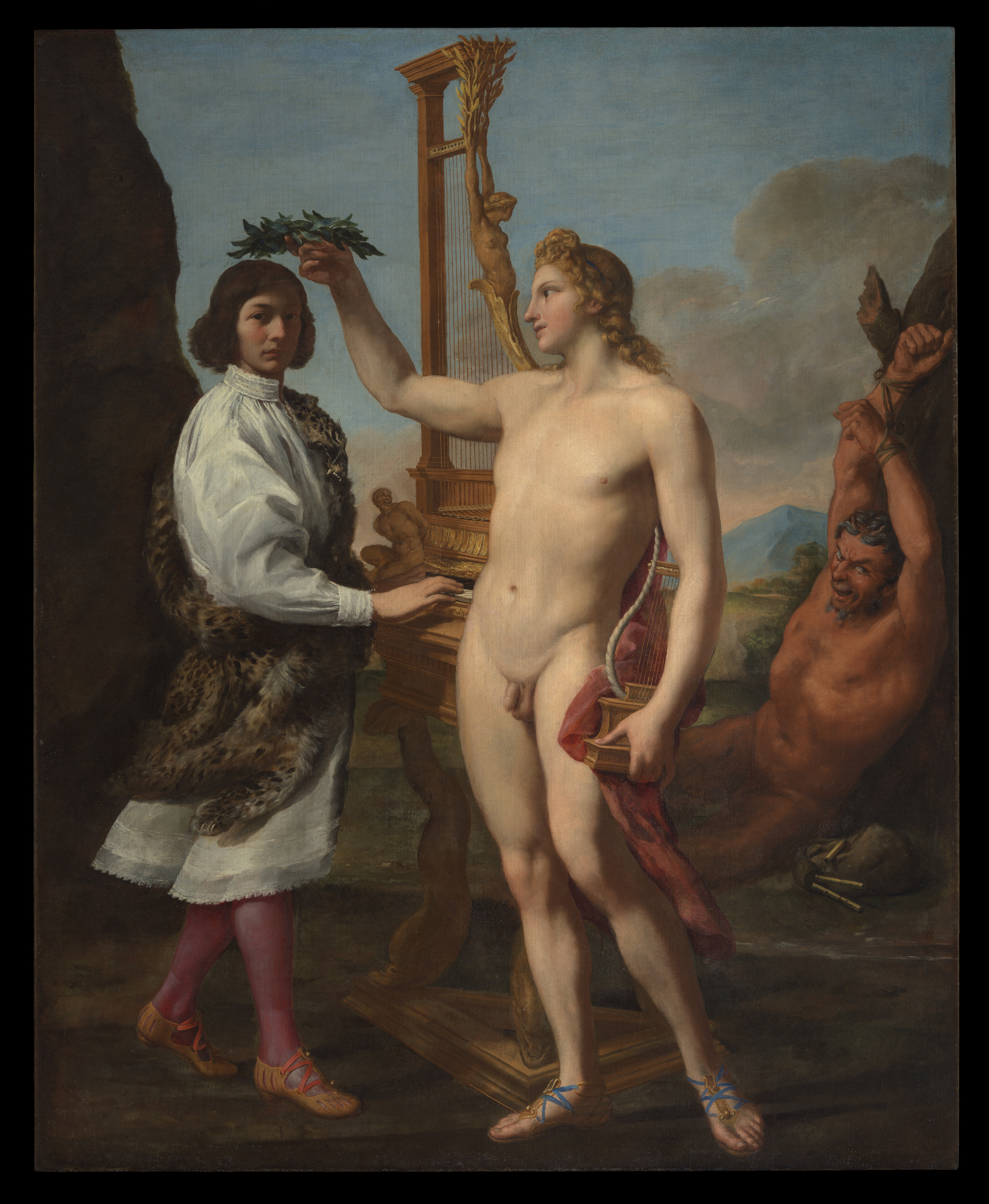
Marcantonio Pasqualini Crowned by Apollo (1641) by Andrea Sacchi.

Marco Antonio Pasqualini (stage name Malagigi; Rome, 25 April 1614 – Rome, 2 July 1691) was an Italian castrato opera singer who performed during the Baroque period. He has been described as "the leading male soprano of his day". He was also a composer, having written more than 250 arias and cantatas.

Despite being historically addressed as a soprano, Pasqualini's vocal range extended no higher than B5. Thus, he was a mezzo-soprano by modern classification.

== Life and career ==
Marc'Antonio Pasqualini began his singing career at a very young age. On 1 April 1623, at the age of nine, he entered the choir of the Church of San Luigi dei Francesi in Rome, where he completed his studies with Vincenzo Ugolini. From 1629 he was in the service of Cardinal Antonio Barberini junior. Under the protection of the cardinal he entered the choir of the Sistine Chapel in January 1631, at the age of 17, and in 1655 he was appointed maestro di cappella of the chapel.

In 1647 at the invitation of Cardinal Jules Mazarin, Pasqualini stayed in Paris, where he participated in the creation of the opera Orfeo by his composer Luigi Rossi on a libretto by Francesco Buti. In the opera, successfully premiered on 2 March 1647 at the Palais-Royal in Paris with Atto Melani and Jacopo Melani, Pasqualini played the role of Aristeo.

He retired from his duties in 1659.

== Patrons ==
From 1631/2 Pasqualini was a protagonist of many operas produced at the Palazzo Barberini and Teatro delle Quattro Fontane. He benefited greatly from the generosity of his patrons, the Barberini family of Pope Urban VIII, who were enthusiastic supporters of early opera.

Pasqualini is thought to have conducted an ongoing homosexual relationship with one of his patrons, Cardinal Antonio Barberini. Contemporary testimony leaves little doubt that the "veritable passion" the cardinal felt extended to more than Pasqualini's beautiful voice.
