= Antonio Barberini =

Italian Cardinal (1607–1671)

His Eminence Antonio Barberini
- Cardinal; Chamberlain of the Papal Treasury; Archbishop of Reims
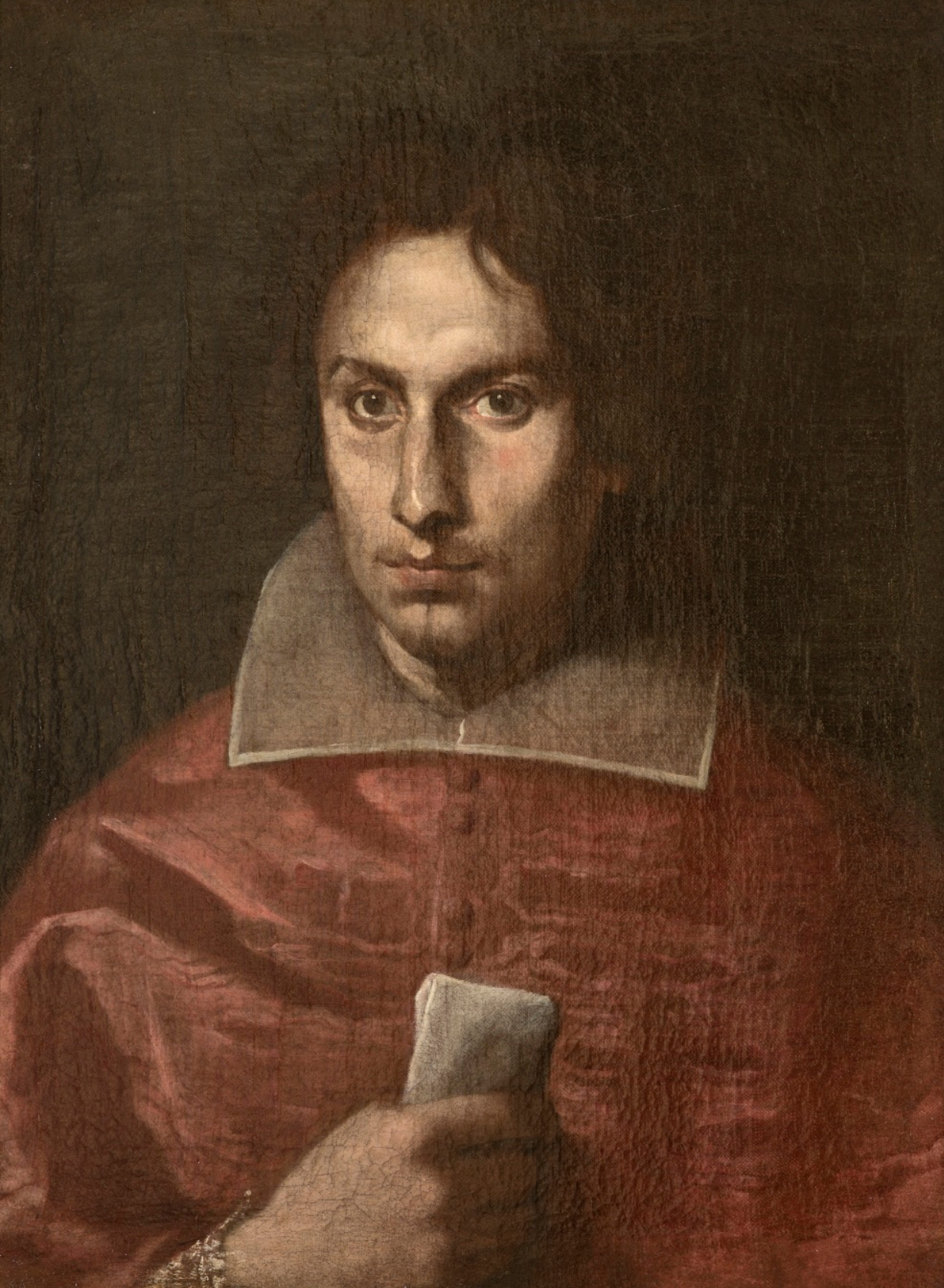
- Portrait by Simone Cantarini, 1630
- Church: Roman Catholic
- Archdiocese: Reims
- See: Notre Dame de Reims
- Installed: 18 July 1657
- Term ended: 3 August 1671
- Predecessor: Henri de Savoie
- Successor: Charles Maurice Le Tellier
- Other post: Bishop of Poitiers

Orders
- Ordination: 19 March 1633 by Antonio Marcello Barberini
- Consecration: 24 October 1655 by Giovanni Battista Scanaroli
- Created cardinal: 30 August 1627 by Urban VIII
- Rank: Cardinal-Bishop

Personal details
- Born: 5 August 1607 Rome, Papal States
- Died: 3 August 1671 (aged 63) Nemi, Lazio, Papal States
- Education: Collegio Romano

Antonio Barberini (5 August 1607 – 3 August 1671) was an Italian Catholic cardinal, Archbishop of Reims, military leader, patron of the arts and a prominent member of the House of Barberini. As one of the cardinal-nephews of Pope Urban VIII and a supporter of France, he played a significant role at a number of the papal conclaves of the 17th century. With his brothers Cardinal Francesco Barberini and Taddeo Barberini he helped to shape politics, religion, art and music of 17th century Italy. He is sometimes referred to as Antonio the Younger or Antonio Barberini iuniore to distinguish him from his uncle Antonio Marcello Barberini.

== Early life ==
Barberini was born on 5 August 1607 in Rome, the youngest of 6 children to Carlo Barberini and Costanza Magalotti (sister of Lorenzo Magalotti). Like his brothers, Antonio was educated at the Collegio Romano.

== Pontificate of Urban VIII ==
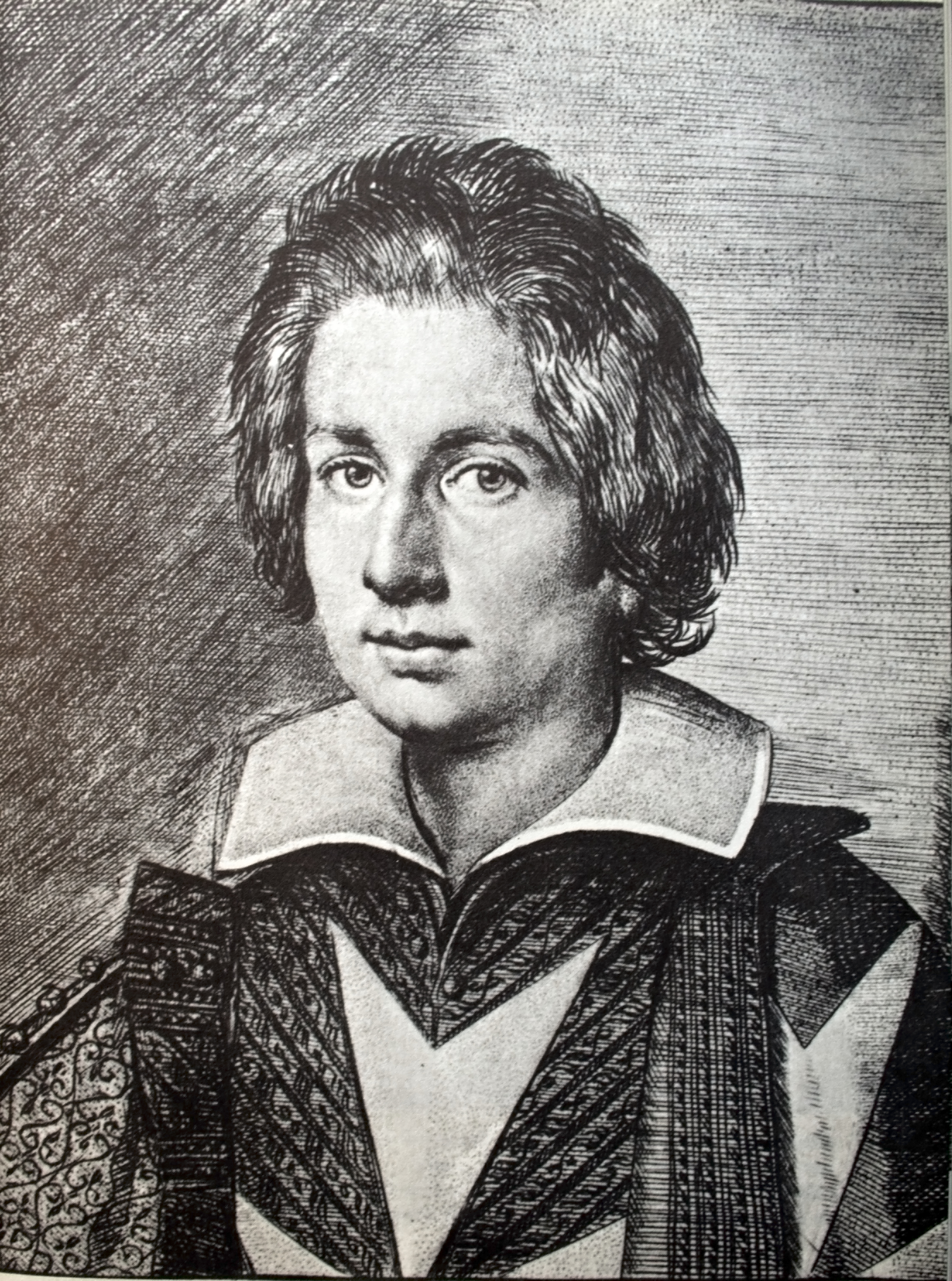
Antonio Barberini in 1625

Barberini's uncle, Maffeo Barberini was elected as pope on 6 August 1623 (the day after Antonio's 16th birthday) and took the papal throne as Pope Urban VIII. Almost immediately, he elevated his brother, Antonio's other uncle, Antonio Marcello Barberini to the position of cardinal. In the tradition of cardinal nephews, Urban also elevated Antonio's older brother Francesco Barberini to the rank of cardinal.

Urban's famous nepotism wasn't sufficiently quelled by the appointment of one cardinal-nephew. Less than a month after his 20th birthday and without having established an ecclesiastic career of his own, Antonio Barberini was appointed as a cardinal on 30 August 1627. His elevation was made in pectore and was published on 7 February 1628. Urban also purchased the comune of the town of Palestrina outside Rome, and Antonio's other brother, Taddeo Barberini, became the Prince of Palestrina.

In 1628, Antonio was appointed Prefect of the Apostolic Signatura. In 1630, he was made the papal legate in Urbino and in 1633, he became legate in Avignon where he developed close contacts with various French church power brokers. During his time in France, he became unwell and employed Joseph Barsalou as his private physician. He returned to Rome and assumed the post of Camerlengo of the Holy Roman Church in 1638. In 1636, against the wish of his uncle the Pope, he accepted the post of Crown-Cardinal-Protector of the Kingdom of France. It has been estimated that during Urban's 21-year pontificate, Barberini amassed more than 63 million scudi in personal wealth.

=== The Wars of Castro ===
In 1639, Odoardo Farnese, Duke of Parma and Piacenza, came to Rome. During his visit he insulted Antonio and his brother Francesco by suggesting to the Pope that the brothers were too young to manage the Pope's affairs. Pope Urban responded by banning grain shipments from Farnese controlled areas. When the Farnese were then unable to pay their debts the Pope sent debt collectors. Finally, the Pope send troops to occupy Castro. The Pope's forces (12,000 infantry and 3,000 cavalry) were led by Antonio, his brother Taddeo and mercenary field commander Luigi Mattei.

Castro fell to Urban's forces without significant resistance and the victory was celebrated in song by Barberini family composer, Marco Marazzoli. But the victory was short lived and thereafter, Antonio and his troops suffered a series of decisive losses and Antonio himself was almost captured. Pope Urban was forced to accept defeat and signed a peace treaty with the Farnese Dukes in an attempt to prevent them from marching on Rome itself. When Urban died, the Church was facing financial struggle, the cardinals (despite francophile Urban's nepotism) were divided between France and Spain and the Farnese were moving toward Rome with a mercenary army in tow.

== Pontificate of Innocent X ==
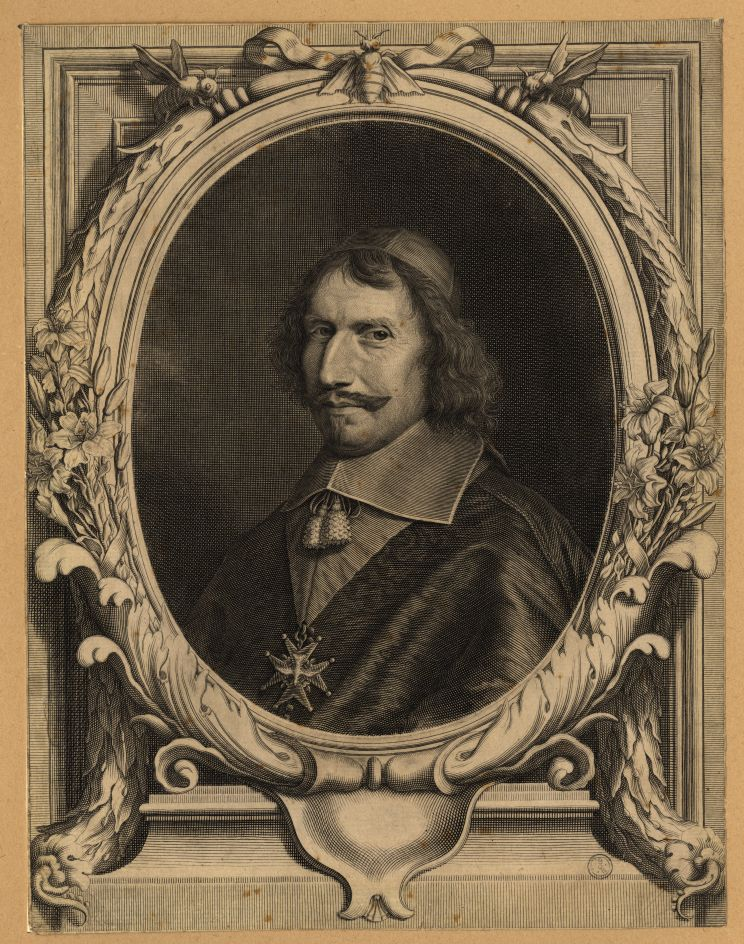
Engraving of Cardinal Barberini, c. 1645.

Antonio had developed a strong relationship with Cardinal Jules Mazarin and was given responsibility for the French contingent within the College of Cardinals and for the nomination of Giulio Cesare Sacchetti at the papal conclave of 1644, which was to pick his uncle's successor. But his efforts were in vain and the Spanish nominee, Giovanni Battista Pamphili (of the powerful Pamphili family), was elected as Pope Innocent X.

Antonio's brother Francesco had sided with the Spanish and split the conclave and it was his negotiations that resulted in Pamphili's election. The final deal in Pamphili's favour included an agreement, designed by the brothers for their own benefit, that the new Pope would allow the Barberini to keep the titles, land and fortunes they had amassed under Pope Urban VIII's reign. Mazarin became so angry because of Antonio's attitude that he deprived him of the protectorate of the Kingdom of France. However, the conflict was of short duration and both cardinals quickly reconciled with each other.

For reasons unknown, Pope Innocent X reneged on the deal and Antonio and his brother Taddeo were accused of financial abuses during the War of Castro. The two went into exile in 1645, in Paris, under the protection of Cardinal Mazarin, and were joined a year later by Francesco. Before leaving Rome, Antonio had the crest of the King of France affixed above his door as a warning to his political rivals that he was now protected by the French Kingdom.

Taddeo Barberini's wife, Anna Colonna made a passionate plea, in person, to the Pope and the Barberini were granted permission to keep their property but the family remained in exile until 1647. The family was finally reconciled with Pope in 1653, when Antonio's nephew (Taddeo's son) Maffeo Barberini married the Pope's grand-niece Olimpia Giustiniani. The reconciliation was, in part, engineered by Cardinal Mazarin and Antonio showed his appreciation by holding celebratory services at the San Luigi dei Francesi (Church of St. Louis of the French).

== Pontificate of Alexander VII ==
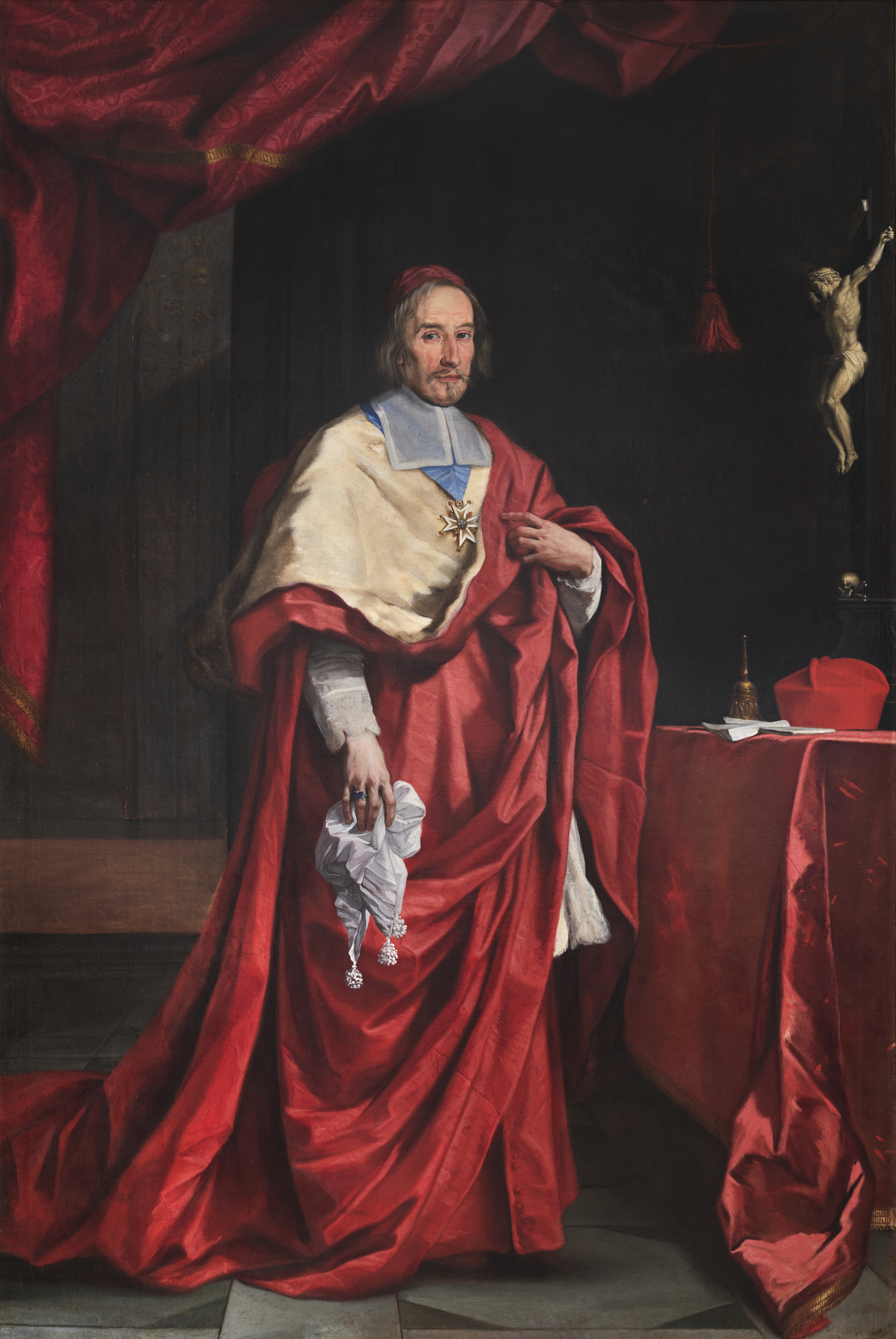
Portrait of cardinal Antonio Barberini by Carlo Maratta.

When Innocent X died in 1655, Antonio Barberini again played a leading role in the College of Cardinals and the conclave. Again, Antonio and the French nominated Giulio Cesare Sacchetti but he was vetoed by the Spanish. The fractured college came together to support Fabio Chigi, who was elected and took office as Pope Alexander VII.

Later that year, he was ordained Cardinal-Bishop of Frascati. About that time, he changed his dissolute lifestyle, devoted himself to religion and became strongly involved in the campaign against Jansenism.

King Louis XIV of France had previously nominated him (in 1653) as Bishop of Poitiers but the nomination was never ratified by the Holy See. (Note: Likely due to his conflicts with the Pope which were not completely repaired until later that year.) Four years later, (1657) the King brought him back to France and transferred him to the Archdiocese of Reims but it took a further decade (1667) before the pope confirmed the post. For many years, he served as Grand Almoner of the Kingdom of France. In 1661, he was appointed Cardinal-Bishop of Palestrina, the diocese that covered the Barberini family comune of Palestrina.

== Later life ==
Barberini participated in the papal conclave of 1667, during which the French delegation successfully campaigned for the election of Giulio Rospigliosi (Pope Clement IX). (Note: Though it seems by this stage Antonio and his brother Francesco were working together in a larger contingent of Cardinals who had been elevated by Pope Urban VIII.) He also participated in the conclave of 1669-1670 at which Emilio Altieri was elected as Pope Clement X. He became Vice-Dean of the Sacred College of Cardinals in March 1671; the dean at that time was his older brother Francesco.

He died in Nemi on 3 August 1671, two days before his 64th birthday.

== Private life ==
Coat of Arms of Cardinal Antonio Barberini

Contemporaries widely commented on Barberini's very dissolute conduct during the pontificate of his uncle. According to Gregorio Leti, "The great inclination he has had to women hath been no small blemish to his reputation". Contemporary John Bargrave, who met Barberini while he was travelling through the Alps on his way to exile in France, also made comment on Barberini's "vicious deportments" and "life full of liberty and debauchery".

According to the controversial anonymous text The Scarlet Gown (a tabloid published in 1653 listing the vices of each living cardinal of the day), Barberini had a number of mistresses including one he had whipped for flaunting herself during Carnivale and another who died mysteriously while carrying his child.

Barberini was also, apparently, involved in several affairs with men. He became particularly intimate with the castrato singer Marc'Antonio Pasqualini in the early 1640s. Contemporary testimony leaves little doubt that the "veritable passion" the cardinal felt extended to more than Pasqualini's beautiful voice. According to some historians, the scandal of his alleged homosexual relationships was the "talk of the town". However, in his later life he underwent conversion, changed his lifestyle and became deeply religious.

== Patronage of the arts ==
=== Music ===
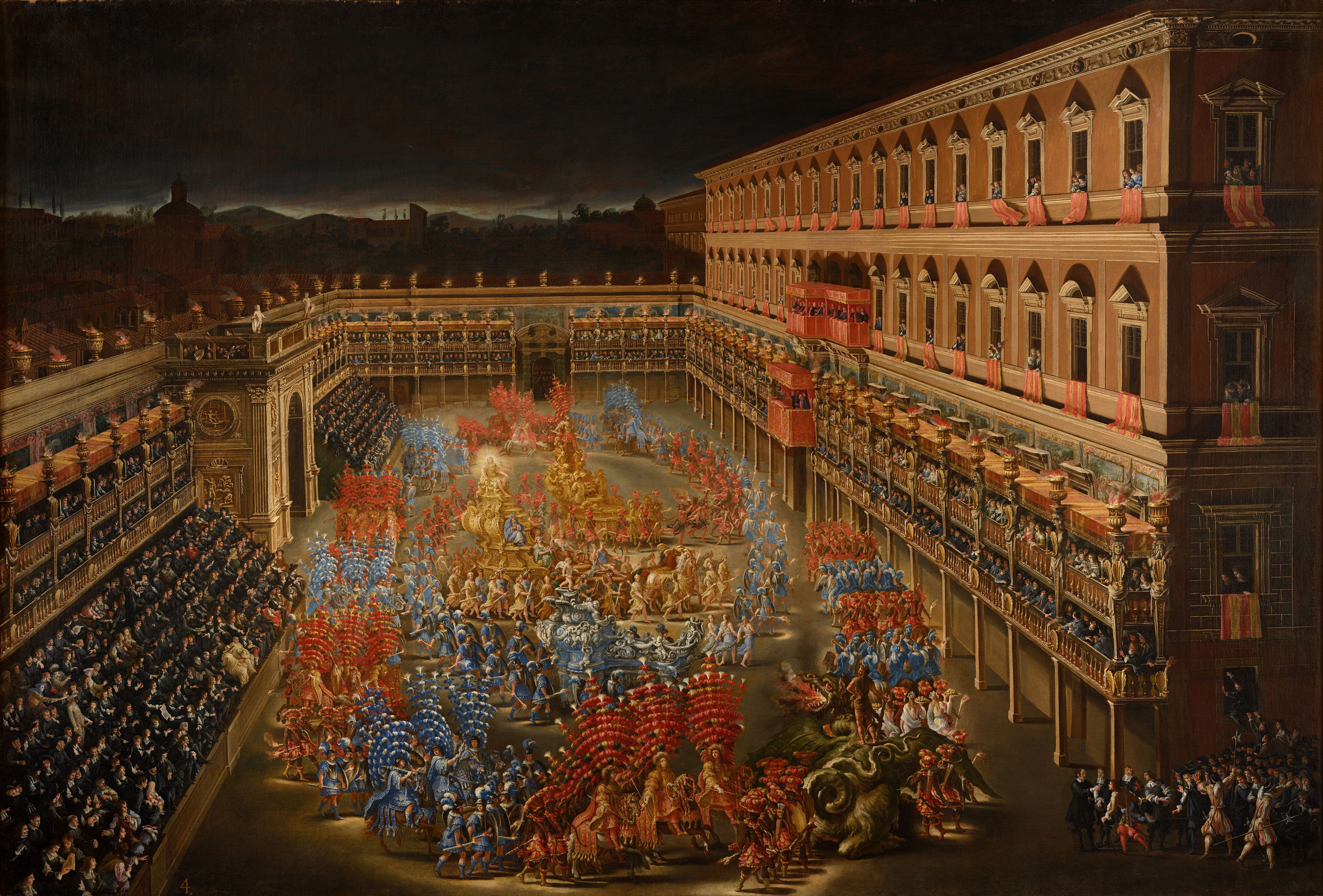
Celebrations for Christina of Sweden at Palazzo Barberini on 28 February 1656.

Antonio Barberini was patron to a number of significant musicians and composers of 17th century Rome including Marco Marazzoli who he commissioned to compose various works which praised the actions of the Barberini family. Marazzoli was appointed Antonio Barberini's aiutante di camera and became a tenor in the papal chapel that same year; in 1639, he was awarded the position of musico under Pope Urban VIII. Marazzoli composed Le armi e gli amori to be given at Carnival 1655, but the papal conclave of 1655 interrupted production, and it was not given until 1656, alongside Dal male e bene and Marazzoli's latest opera, Vita humana which was composed to honor the visit of Queen Christina of Sweden. (Note: Celebrations were held at the Palazzo Barberini honouring the Queen's visit)

Fiori musicali was dedicated to Antonio Barberini in 1635. He was also said to have been a patron of Luigi Rossi.

Outside their intimate relationship, Antonio Barberini was an ongoing patron of Marc'Antonio Pasqualini.

=== Architecture ===
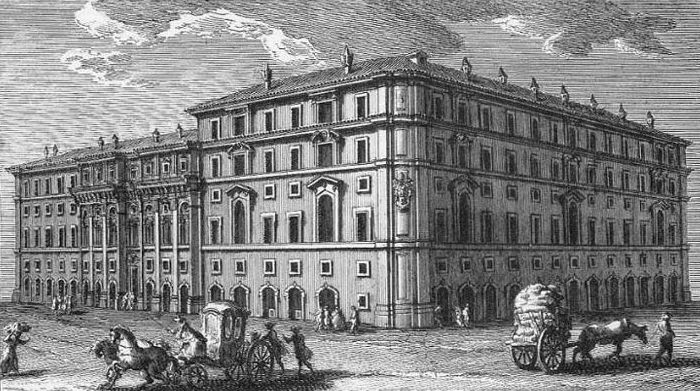
The headquarters of the Propaganda fide in Rome, commissioned by Antonio Barberini.

In 1627, the Barberini family commissioned the architect Carlo Maderno to adapt and extend the Palazzo Sforza that they had purchased, into the Palazzo Barberini. In this work, Maderno was assisted by his relative Francesco Borromini. When Maderno died in 1629, Borromini was passed over and the commission was awarded to Bernini, a young prodigy then better known as a sculptor. Borromini stayed on and the two architects worked together; later in their careers fierce rivalries would develop. The palace was completed in 1633.

Prior to his election, Pope Urban VIII had been a member of the Sacred Congregation for the Propagation of the Faith. Antonio Barberini was appointed prefect of the Congregation and set about commissioning a new palace, the Palazzo del Propaganda Fide. The construction was started by close Barberini family friend Gianlorenzo Bernini. In 1644, when Antonio was exiled, Bernini was replaced by Borromini who demolished Bernini's chapel and built his own design; the chapel is considered one of Borromini's masterpieces.

Antonio and his brothers also commissioned the Teatro delle Quattro Fontane (or Theatre of the Four Fountains); an opera house in Rome and built in 1632. It was located in Via delle Quattro Fontane, near the Piazza Barberini and the Quattro Fontane or Four Fountains.

=== Art ===
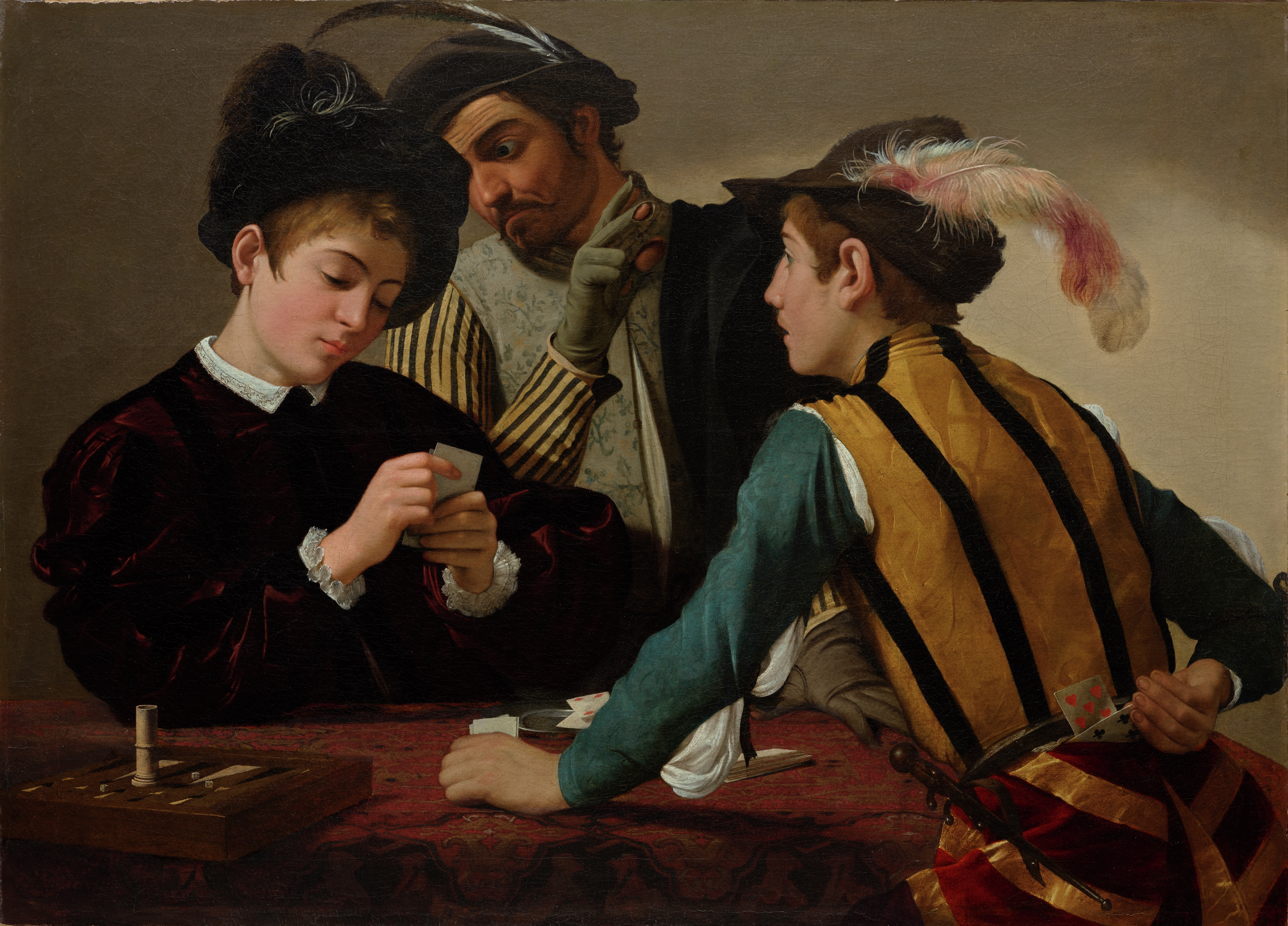
Caravaggio's Cardsharps (c. 1594) which later came into the collection of Antonio Barberini.

Though Michelangelo Merisi da Caravaggio died when Antonio Barberini was only 3 years old, the Cardinal later became a great admirer of his work and his extensive art collection included Caravaggio's paintings such as Still Life with Fruit, Cardsharps and The Lute Player. Antonio had purchased the art collection of Francesco Maria Del Monte upon the cardinal's death which had included a large number of important works. Pope Urban VIII had purchased a number of works directly from Caravaggio and it is likely Antonio also inherited a number of these. An inventory of Antonio's assets was compiled upon his death in 1671, which included a large number of such artworks by artists of the period.

Antonio commissioned Lorenzo Ottoni to complete a number of Barberini family sculptures including that of his nephew Maffeo Barberini.

Antonio and his uncle also commissioned the painter Andrea Sacchi to complete various works at Antonio's Capuchin church and at the Palazzo Barberini. Today, the Palazzo Barberini houses the Galleria Nazionale d'Arte Antica, one of the most important painting collections in Italy.

Today, a portrait of Antonio by Carlo Maratta hangs at Alnwick Castle in Northumberland, UK, where Algernon Percy, 4th Duke of Northumberland, acquired a number of Barberini-owned pictures in the mid-nineteenth century.

== Notes ==
Catholic Church titles
Preceded by Ludovico Ludovisi	Prefect of the Congregation for the Propagation of the Faith; 1632–1671	Succeeded by Paluzzo Paluzzi Altieri degli Albertoni
Preceded by Ippolito Aldobrandini	Camerlengo of the Holy Roman Church; 1638–1671	Succeeded by Paluzzo Paluzzi Altieri degli Albertoni
Preceded by Giulio Cesare Sacchetti	Cardinal-Bishop of Frascati; 1655–1661	Succeeded by Girolamo Colonna
Preceded by Henri de Savoie, 7th Duc de Nemours	Archbishop of Reims; 1659–1671	Succeeded by Charles Maurice Le Tellier
Preceded by Bernardino Spada	Cardinal-Bishop of Palestrina; 1661–1671	Succeeded by Rinaldo d'Este
Preceded by Marzio Ginetti	Vice-Dean of the Sacred College of Cardinals; 1671	Succeeded by Francesco Maria Brancaccio
