= Antonio Maria Abbatini =

Italian composer

Antonio Maria Abbatini (c. 1609 or 1610 – c. 1677 or 1679) was an Italian composer, active mainly in Rome.

Abbatini was born in Città di Castello. He served as maestro di cappella at the Basilica of St. John Lateran from 1626 to 1628; at the cathedral in Orvieto in 1633; and at Santa Maria Maggiore in Rome between 1640 and 1646, 1649 to 1657, and 1672 to 1677. He composed church music, and published three books of Masses, four of Psalms, various 24-part Antiphons (1630, 1638, 1677), five books of Motets (1635), and a dramatic cantata, Il Pianto di Rodomonte (1633). He also worked with Athanasius Kircher on the Musurgia Universalis.

In addition, he produced three operas: Dal male il bene (Rome, 1654; in collaboration with Marco Marazzoli), which was one of the earliest comic operas, and historically important as it introduced the final ensemble; Ione (Vienna, 1666); and La comica del cielo, also called La Baltasara (Rome, 1668).

Antonio Cesti was among his pupils.

== Sources ==
- Nicolas Slonimsky, ed. (1958). "Abbatini, Antonio Maria". Baker's Biographical Dictionary of Musicians (5th ed.). p. 2.

== Note ==
- This article or an earlier version incorporates text from the 3rd edition (1919) of Baker's Biographical Dictionary of Musicians, a publication now in the public domain.
