= Virgilio Mazzocchi =

Italian Baroque composer

Virgilio Mazzocchi (bapt. 22 July 1597 – 3 October 1646) was an Italian baroque composer.

== Biography ==
He was born in Veja, near Civita Castellana, where he was baptized, as the younger brother of the more famous composer and learned lawyer Domenico Mazzocchi.

Like his brother, who shared some features of his career, he was largely a composer of sacred vocal music. Mazzocchi is associated with providing music for the papal chapels.

He died in Civita Castellana, where he had gone with his singers to celebrate the holy patrons, after a sudden illness.

== Works ==
- Chi soffre, speri, in collaboration with Marco Marazzoli - Rome (1637);
- Vespro Della Beata Vergine, vespers for the Holy Virgin.

=== Recordings ===
- Virgilio Mazzocchi, Vespro Della Beata Vergine, Konrad Junghänel (conductor), Concerto Palatino, Cantus Cölln (YouTube).

== Sources and References ==
- Entry under Domenico (and Virgilio) Mazzocchi in the Concise Baker's Biographical Dictionary of Musicians
- Entry under Virgilio Mazzocchi in the Grove Dictionary of Music and Musicians.
- Cardinali A., 1926, Cenni biografici di Domenico e Virgilio Mazzocchi.
