= Marco Marazzoli =

Italian composer and priest

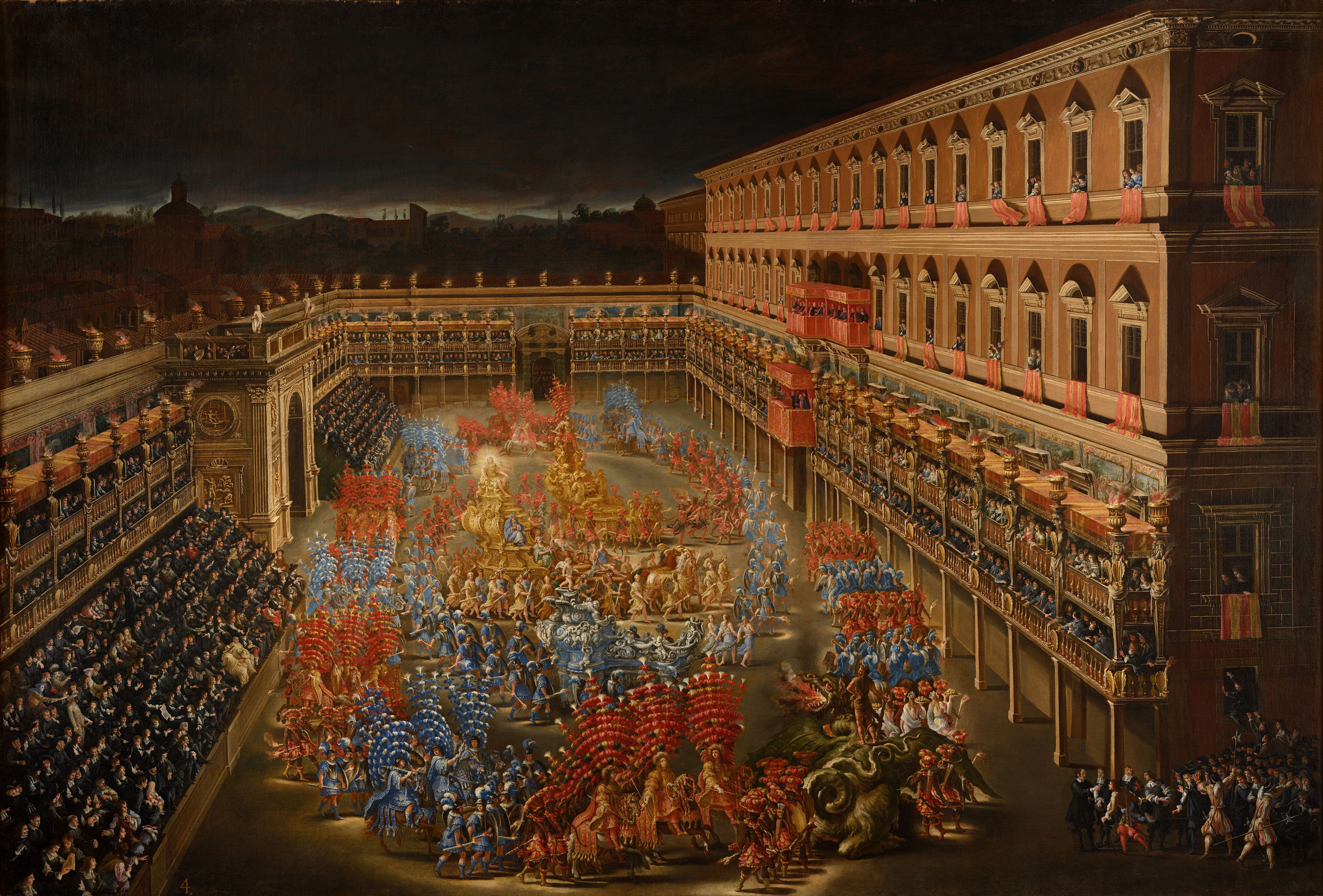
Celebrations for Christina of Sweden at Palazzo Barberini in 1656 for which Marazzoli composed music.

Marco Marazzoli (1602? – 26 January 1662) was an Italian priest and Baroque music composer.

== Early life ==
Born at Parma, Marazzoli received early training as a priest, and was ordained around 1625. He moved to Rome in 1626, and entered the service of Cardinal Antonio Barberini. In 1631, he and other musicians such as Filippo Vitali and Landi accompanied the cardinal on a trip to Urbino and may have accompanied him on other official travels. In 1637, Marazzoli was appointed Barberini's aiutante di camera, and became a tenor in the papal chapel that same year; in 1639, he was awarded the position of musico under Barberini.

== Barberini patronage ==
About this time, it becomes possible to trace some of Marazzoli's compositions to specific places and functions. In 1638, he composed the music for a ballet La piazza d'Orlando for the Carnival of Venice and the intermedi for Chi soffre, speri for the Carnival of 1639. These two pieces were performed at the Palazzo Barberini.

After 1640, he began composing more for patrons in Ferrara and Venice, including an opera, L'Amore trionfante dello Sdegno (or L'Armida), for a Ferrarese wedding in 1641.

Also in 1641, the Barberini were embroiled in the Wars of Castro, and Marazzoli set the events of the battle fought by Taddeo Barberini and Luigi Mattei in October 1641 to music in Le pretensioni del Tebro e del Po, probably composed late in 1641. Marazzoli's L'Armida was performed in a revised version in January 1642 at a celebratory fete. At Carnival in 1642, Marazzoli had another opera performed, Gli amori di Giasone e d'Isifile; following this, Marazzoli returned to Ferrara and directed another performance of Le pretensioni to celebrate Taddeo Barberini's return to the city in March 1642.

Returning to Rome by midyear, Marazzoli composed the opera Il giudito della ragione tra la Beltà e l'Affetto (or Il Capriccio), which was first given at Carnival 1643. Towards the end of 1642, Marazzoli was granted papal permission to travel to Paris with a group of Italian musicians; here he was employed at the court of Anne of Austria, composing chamber cantatas which greatly pleased his patron.

== Barberini exile ==
In April 1645, he returned again to Rome, finding to his chagrin that the Barberini family had been exiled to France (where they would remain until 1653). He then turned to composing oratorios both in Latin and Italian, some of which were written for the Arciconfraternita del SS Crocifisso.

== Barberini return ==
Upon Antonio Barberini's return, he commissioned an opera from Marazzoli for the wedding of Taddeo Barberini's son Maffeo Barberini; pressed for time, Marazzoli collaborated with Antonio Maria Abbatini to create Dal male il bene, given at Carnival 1654 at Barberini's theater.

Le armi e gli amori was to be given at Carnival 1655, but the papal conclave of 1655 interrupted production, and it was not given until 1656, alongside Dal male il bene and Marazzoli's latest opera, Vita humana (composed to honor the visiting Queen Christina of Sweden).

Marazzoli may have composed the prologue to a ballet by Jean-Baptiste Lully in 1657 entitled L'Amour malade, but this is not certain. From 1655, Marazzoli composed works commissioned by Pope Alexander VII, including festival cantatas. Alexander named him cameriere extra in 1656, but a plague hit that year, and musical life in Rome ebbed until 1660.

Marazzoli was also a famed harpist, and played the gilded three-rank "Barberini harp", which was painted by Giovanni Lanfranco and which is now owned by the Museo degli Strumenti Musicali in Rome.

Marazzoli was seriously hurt in an accident during a mass at the Sistine Chapel on 25 January 1662, and died the following day.

== Works ==
=== Stage works ===
Operas

- La pazzia d'Orlando (1638, music lost)
- La fiera di Farfa (1639)
- L'Amore trionfante dello Sdegno (L'Armida) (1641)
- Gli amori de Giasone e d'Isifile (1642, music lost)
- Le pretensioni del Tebro e del Po (1642)
- Il giudito della ragione tra la Beltà e l'Affetto (Il Capriccio) (1643, music lost)
- Dal male il bene (1654)
- La Vita humana (1656) - libretto by Rospigliosi, the future pope Clement IX. Revived by Le Poème Harmonique, dir. Vincent Dumestre at the Ambronay Festival 2006.
- Le armi e gli amori (1656)

Other

- Intermedio for Troades (1640, doubtful)
- Prologue to Lully's L'Amour malade (1657, doubtful)

=== Oratorios ===
(all composed 1645-1653)

Latin oratorios

- Erat fames in terra Canaan
- Erat quidam languens Lazarus
- Erat quidem languidus
- Homo erat pater familias
- Venit Jesus in civitatem Samarie
- O mestissime Jesu

Italian oratorios

- Per il giorno della resurrezione
- S Tomaso
- S Caterina
- Natale di N.S. (lost)
- Per ogni tempo (lost)
- S Giustina di Padova (lost)
- Ecco il gran rè de regi
- Poiché Maria dal sui virgineo seno
- Qual nume omnipotente che diè leggi
- Udito habbiam Giesù

=== Cantatas ===
Marazzoli wrote a large number of cantatas, for one to six voices with continuo accompaniment. Eleanor Caluori in her article of Marco Marazzoli in The New Grove Dictionary of Music and Musicians 1st edition gives a complete list of his cantatas.
