= La morte d'Orfeo =

Opera by Stefano Landi

La morte d'Orfeo (The Death of Orpheus) is an opera in five acts by the Italian composer Stefano Landi. Dedicated to Alessandro Mattei, familiaris of Pope Paul V, it may have been first performed in Rome in 1619. The work is styled a tragicomedia pastorale (pastoral tragicomedy). The libretto, which may be by the composer himself, is in part inspired by La favola d'Orfeo (1484) by Angelo Poliziano. Unlike Monteverdi's L'Orfeo and the earliest Florentine operas on the subject (Euridice by Peri and Caccini), Landi's opera contains comic elements and deals with a different episode from the life of the mythical singer.

== Roles ==
Role	Voice type
Orfeo (Orpheus)	tenor
Teti (Thetis)	alto castrato (en travesti)
Fato (Destiny)	bass
L'Ebro	bass
Aurora	alto castrato (en travesti)
Mercurio (Mercury)	tenor
Apollo	tenor
Bacco (Dionysus)	alto castrato
Nisa	soprano castrato (en travesti)
Ireno	tenor
Lincastro	alto castrato
Furore (Wrath)	bass
Calliope	alto castrato (en travesti)
Fileno	tenor
Caronte (Charon)	bass
Euridice (Eurydice)	soprano castrato (en travesti)
Giove (Jupiter)	bass
Fosforo	alto castrato
Three Euretti	soprano castratos/2 altos castratos

== Synopsis ==
After Orpheus has failed to save his wife Eurydice from the underworld, he renounces wine and the love of women. This offends the god Bacchus who urges his female followers, the Maenads, to kill Orpheus. The enraged Maenads tear him apart. The gods want the dead Orpheus to join them on Olympus but Orpheus wants to be reunited with Eurydice in Hades. Only after the god Mercury shows him that, having drunk the waters of Lethe, Eurydice no longer remembers her husband, does Orpheus agree to ascend to Olympus.

== Recordings ==
=== Audio ===
- 1987: La morte d'Orfeo, John Elwes, Koslowski, Cordier, Harry van der Kamp, Tragicomedia, conducted by Stephen Stubbs (Accent, 1987; Musical Heritage Society, 1989; Pan classics 2016)
- 2007: La morte d'Orfeo, Cyril Auvity, Guillemette Laurens, Dominique Visse, van Elsacker, Guillon, Bucher, Akadêmia, conducted by Françoise Lasserre (Zig Zag Territoires, 2007)

=== Video ===
- 2018: La morte d'Orfeo, Cecilia Molinari, Renato Dolcini, Alexander Miminoshvili, Gaia Petrone, Juan Francisco Gatell, Les Talens Lyriques, conducted by Christophe Rousset. Blu-ray Naxos Records Cat:NBD0111V. Released 2020.

== Sources ==
- The Viking Opera Guide ed. Amanda Holden (Viking, 1993)
- Del Teatro (in Italian)
- Le magazine de l'opera baroque by Jean-Claude Brenac (in French)
- The Oxford Illustrated History of Opera ed. Parker (OUP, 1994)
