= Stefano Landi =

Italian composer (1587–1639)

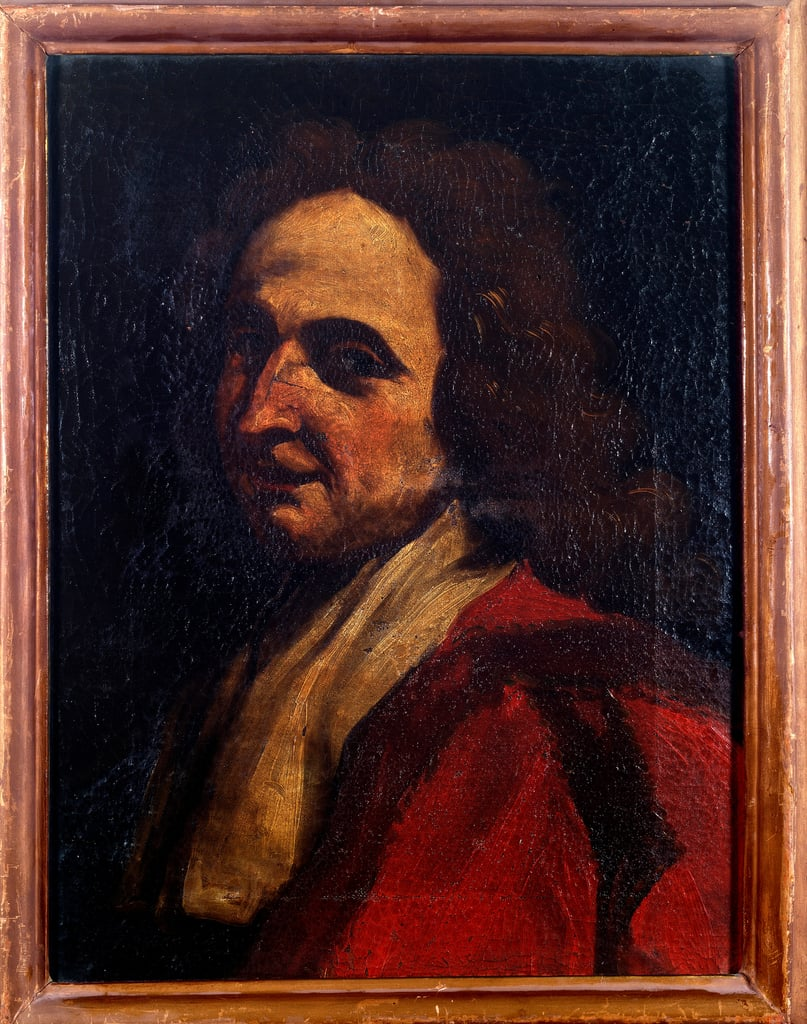
Stefano Landi

Stefano Landi (baptized 26 February 1587 – 28 October 1639) was an Italian composer and teacher of the early Baroque Roman School. He was an influential early composer of opera, and wrote the earliest opera on a historical subject: Il Sant'Alessio (1632).

== Biography ==
Landi was born in Rome, the capital of the Papal States.

In 1595, he joined the Collegio Germanico in Rome as a boy soprano, and he may have studied with Asprilio Pacelli. Landi took minor orders in 1599 and began studying at the Seminario Romano in 1602. He is mentioned in the Seminary's records as being the composer and director of a Carnival pastoral in 1607; and in 1611, his name appears as an organist and a singer, though he was already maestro di cappella at S Maria della Consolazione in 1614. Agostino Agazzari was maestro di cappella at the Seminario Romano, and he may have been one of Landi's teachers as well.

In 1618, he had moved to the north of Italy, and published a book of five-voice madrigals at Venice; apparently he had acquired a post as maestro di cappella at Padua. In addition, he wrote his first opera in Padua, La morte d'Orfeo. Most likely it was used as part of the festivities for a wedding. His experience in Padua and Venice was essential for developing his style, since there he made contact with the work of the progressive Venetian School composers, whose music was generally avoided in conservative Rome.

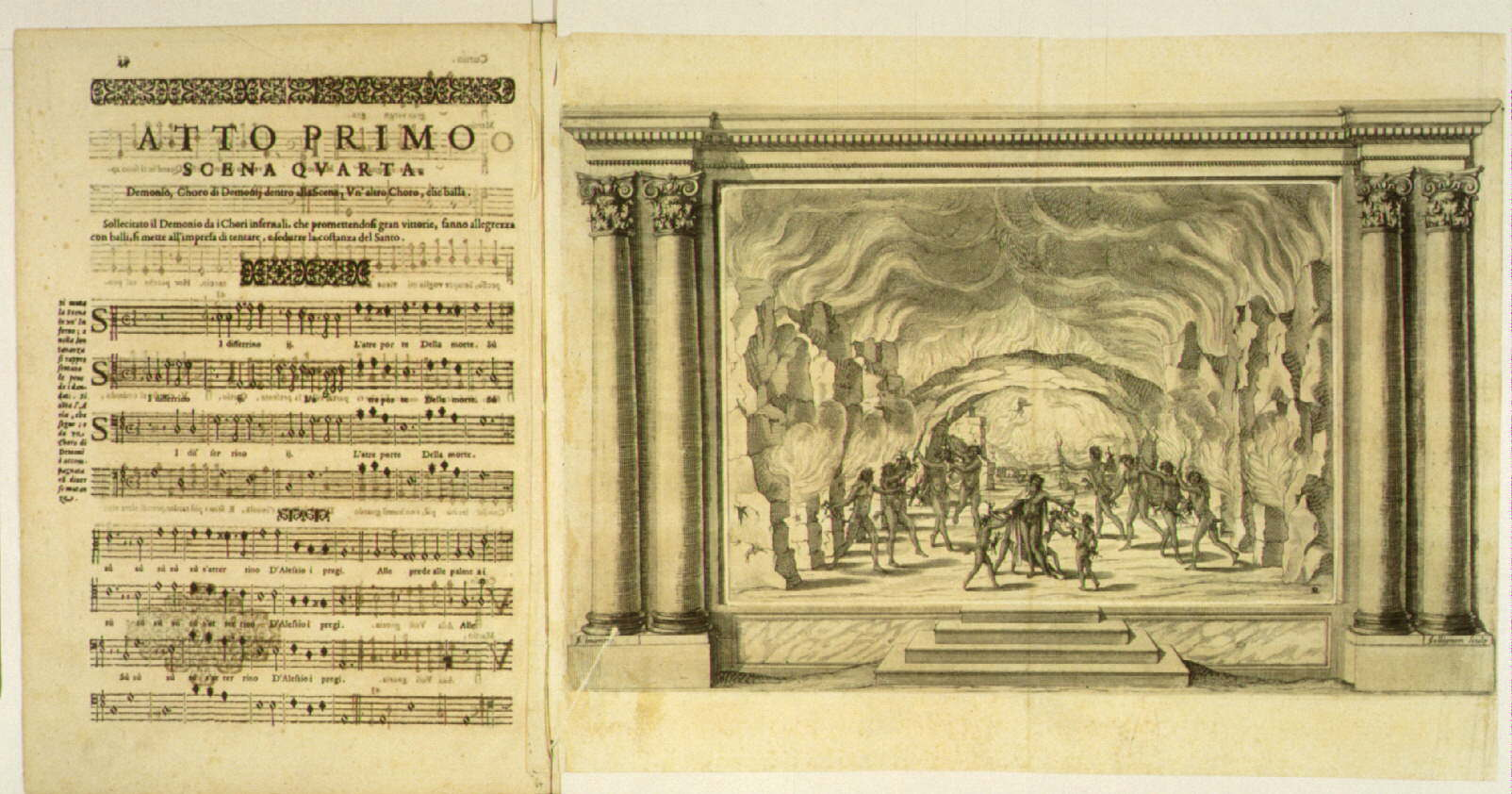
1634 publication of Il Sant'Alessio with woodcut illustration showing a scene from the opera.

In 1620, Landi returned to Rome, where he spent the rest of his life, where his patrons included successively the Borghese family, Cardinal Maurizio of Savoy, and the Barberini family, who were to be his major employers throughout the late 1620s and 1630s, though he joined the papal choir in 1629 on half-salary. It was for the Barberini family that he wrote the work for which he is most famous, Sant'Alessio, in 1632, which was used to open the Teatro delle Quattro Fontane. Throughout this period, he was compositionally prolific, writing masses, arias, and responsories, mostly in the seconda pratica style of the early Baroque, a decision which was controversial with some of the more conservative musicians, who thought the prima pratica — the style of Palestrina — more appropriate for sacred music.

After about 1636, he began suffering ill-health, and he died at Rome in 1639 and was buried at Santa Maria in Vallicella.

== Music and influence ==
Landi's secular music is more conservative than most of his sacred music, and his first book of madrigals, for five voices and basso continuo, is almost indistinguishable in style from many late 16th-century collections, except for the basso continuo part. His other secular music consists of strophic airs, arias, and other songs for voice and basso continuo.

Landi's masses, of which there are only two, are in the simple, 16th-century style encouraged (and sometimes demanded) by the Counter-Reformation. However he uses the Venetian stile concertato for some of his motets, as well as his Magnificat and Vespers psalm settings, probably as a result of the years he spent in northern Italy.

By far his most famous composition, and one of the most significant operas of the early Baroque, is his setting of the life of fifth-century Saint Alexis, Il Sant'Alessio. Not only is it the first opera to be written on a historical subject, but it carefully describes the inner life of the saint, and attempts psychological characterization of a type new to opera. Most of the interspersed comic scenes, however, are anachronistically (and hilariously) drawn from contemporary life in 17th-century Rome.

The part of Sant'Alessio himself is extremely high, and was meant to be sung by a castrato. At the initial performance, half of the singers were from the papal choir, and there were several soprano parts sung by other castrati. The accompanying orchestra is up-to-date, dispensing with the archaic viols and using violins, cellos, harps, lutes, theorbos, and harpsichords. The opera includes introductory canzonas which function as overtures; indeed they are the first overtures in the history of opera. Dances and comic sections mix with serious arias, recitatives, and even a madrigalian lament, for an overall dramatic variety which was extremely effective, as attested by the frequent performances of the opera at the time. Sant'Alessio was one of the first staged dramatic works successfully to mix both the monodic and polyphonic styles.

== References and further reading ==
- Arnaldo Morelli, "Landi, Stefano", in Dizionario Biografico degli Italiani
- Margaret Murata: "Stefano Landi", Grove Music Online ed. L. Macy (Accessed January 9, 2005), Grove Music Online
- Manfred Bukofzer, Music in the Baroque Era. New York, W.W. Norton & Co., 1947. ISBN 0-393-09745-5
- The New Grove Dictionary of Music and Musicians, ed. Stanley Sadie. 20 vol. London, Macmillan Publishers Ltd., 1980. ISBN 1-56159-174-2
- Donald Jay Grout, A Short History of Opera. New York, Columbia University Press, 1965. ISBN 0-231-02422-3
- F. Kennedy, The Musical Tradition at the Roman Seminary During the First Sixty Years (1564–1621), in Bellarmino e la Controriforma, Atti del simposio internazionale di studi, Sora 15–18 October 1986, pp. 629–660
