= Teatro delle Quattro Fontane =

Coordinates: 41.90407°N 12.49036°E

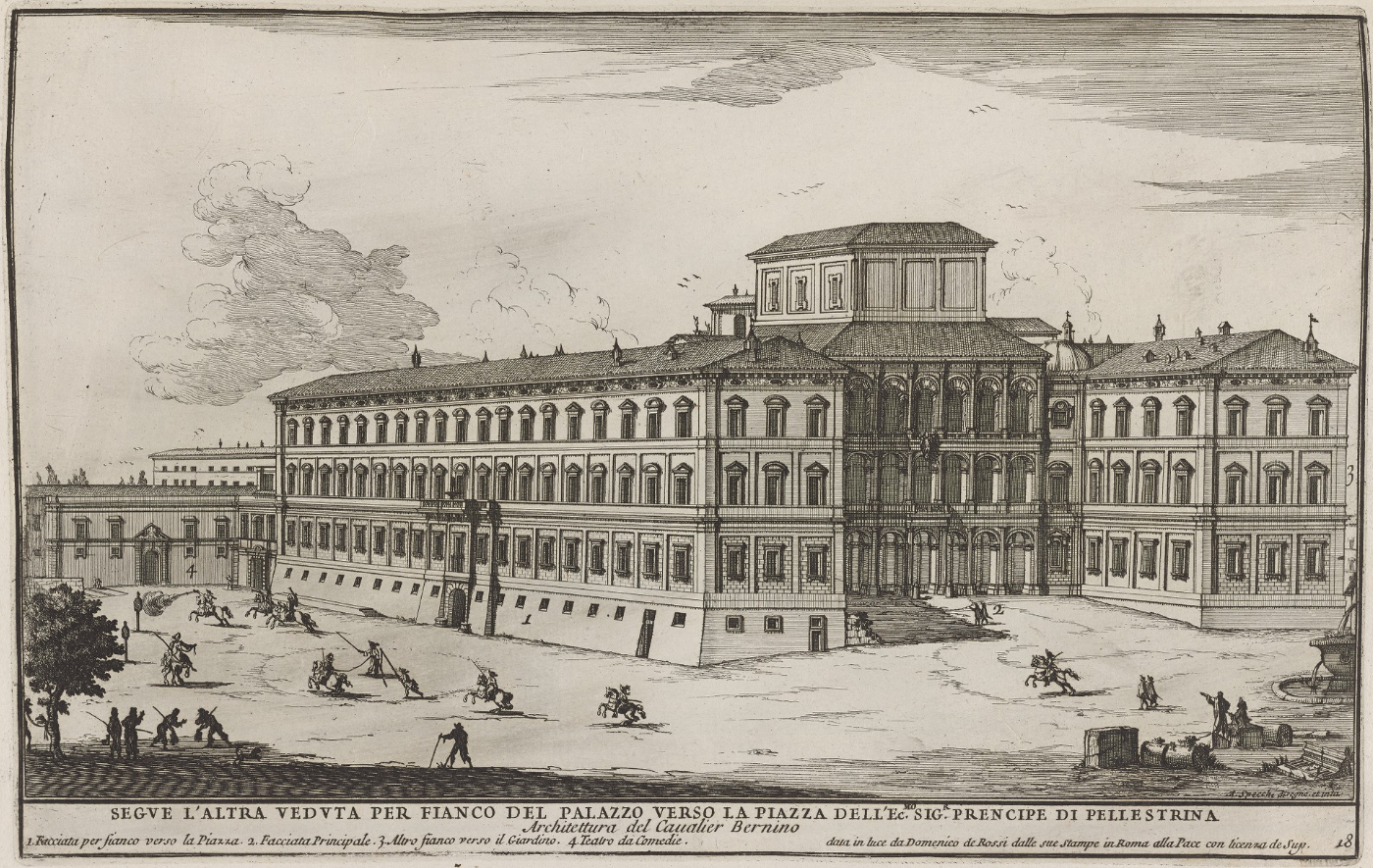
View of the Palazzo Barberini with the second theatre at the left, labelled "4. Teatro da Comedie", 1699 etching by Alessandro Specchi

The Teatro delle Quattro Fontane ('Theatre of the Four Fountains'), also known as the Teatro Barberini, was an opera theatre in Rome, Italy, designed (in part) by Gian Lorenzo Bernini and built in 1632 by the Barberini family. From 1632 to 1637 it was located in a large room inside the Palazzo Barberini at the Quattro Fontane. In 1639, it was moved to a new, free-standing building, northeast of the palace and adjacent to the garden. By 1830, the theatre had closed, and the building was used for other purposes. It was demolished in 1932.

== History ==
The theatre was initially located in Francesco Barberini's first anteroom on the piano nobile (main floor, above the ground floor) inside the south wing of the palace. The room was two stories high and vaulted. There were clerestory windows on the east side. Judging from its size, it could probably accommodate no more than a few hundred spectators.

The theatre was inaugurated in 1632 with the opera Sant' Alessio (Saint Alexis; first performed in 1631), composed by Stefano Landi to a libretto by Giulio Rospigliosi, a protégé of the Barberini Pope Urban VIII, later himself elected Pope Clement IX.

Access to the theatre was via the central salone. After the completion of Francesco Borromini's elliptical staircase, begun in April 1633, the theatre could also be reached directly from a vestibule. Taddeo Barberini already occupied the north wing of the palace, but the rooms in the south wing to which Francesco's anteroom led were not yet ready, so its use as a theatre during Carnival did not interfere with that part of the palace. However, as the south wing neared completion, and the Barberinis' theatrical ambitions grew, the need for a different, larger space became apparent.

A new theatre, begun in 1636 and erected northeast of the palace, accommodated 3,000 to 4,000 spectators. Carriages could drop off guests at the door and wait on the terrace north of the palace or in the Piazza Barberini below. The theatre was inaugurated in 1639 with a revised version of the opera Chi soffre speri ('Who suffers may hope'; first performed in 1637 in the theatre inside the palace).

The theatre closed temporarily in 1642 at the height of the Barberini Wars of Castro with the Farnese Dukes of Parma which became incredibly expensive for the family and the Holy See. The theatre had not yet reopened before when its patrons, the three Barberini nephews of Pope Urban (Francesco Barberini, Antonio Barberini (Antonio the Younger), and Taddeo Barberini), were sent into exile by the newly elected Pope Innocent X.

Finally in 1653, after more than 10 years with its doors closed, Taddeo's son Maffeo Barberini returned to Rome and married Olimpia Giustiniani; finally reconciling the Barberini with the papacy. As the new Prince of Palestrina he reopened the theatre and recommenced performances.

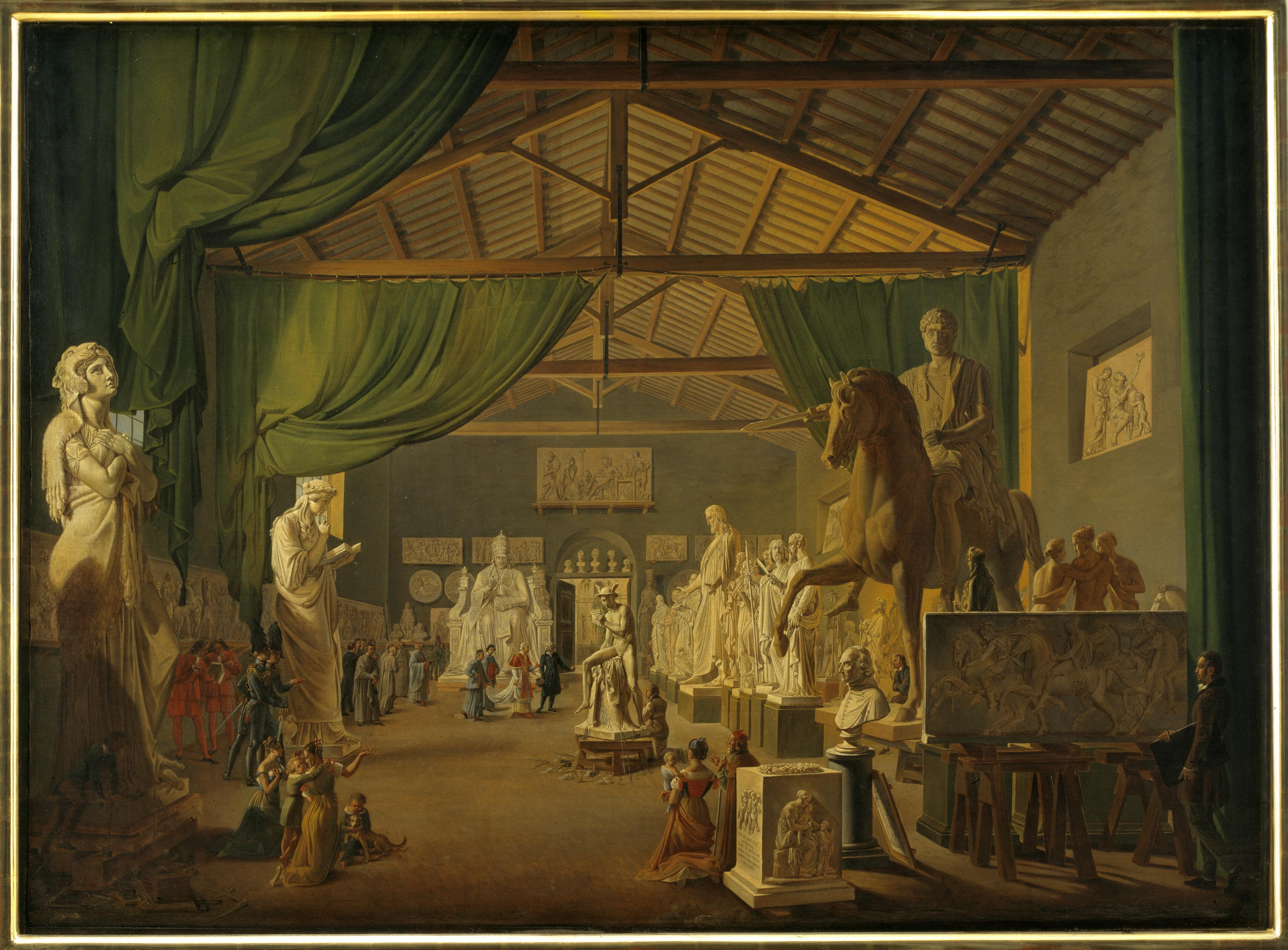
Leo XII Visiting the Studio of Thorvaldsen by H. D. C. Martens, 1830

The theatre building outlasted the Barberini theatrical productions and was later altered internally for other uses. The only surviving image of the interior is an 1830 painting showing Pope Leo XII visiting the studio of Bertel Thorvaldsen, by which time it had been split into two floors and rented to the sculptor. In 1932, the building was demolished to make way for the new Via Barberini. The portals, windows, and angle rustication were used in the construction of a new building erected on the reduced site.

== See also ==
- Baroque architecture
- List of theatres and opera houses in Rome

== Sources ==
- Hammond, Frederick (1994). Music & Spectacle in Baroque Rome: Barberini Patronage under Urban VIII. New Haven and London: Yale University Press. ISBN 9780300055283.
- Hammond, Frederick (1999). "The Creation of a Roman Festival: Barberini Celebrations for Christina of Sweden", pp. 53–69, in Life and the Arts in the Baroque Palaces of Rome, exhibition catalog edited by Stefanie Walker and Frederick Hammond. New Haven and London: Yale University Press. ISBN 9780300079340.
- Waddy, Patricia (1990). Seventeenth-Century Roman Palaces: Use and the Art of the Plan. Cambridge, Massachusetts: The MIT Press. ISBN 9780262231565.
