= Palast Barberini =

Palace in Potsdam, Germany

Coordinates: 52°23′43.81″N 13°3′43.7″E

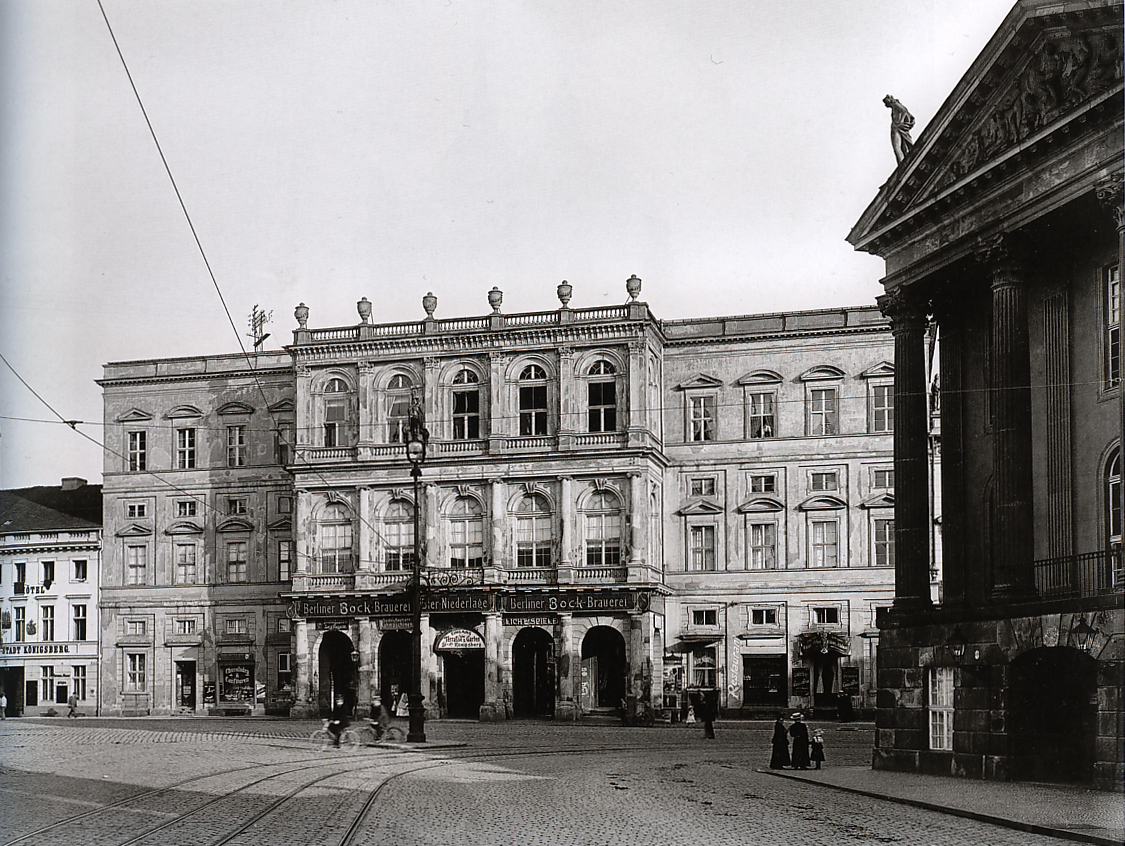
The Palast Barberini in a photograph by Ernst Eichgrün, 1907

The Palast Barberini, more recently also known as the Palais Barberini, was a classicist-baroque town house built under the Prussian King Frederick II according to designs by Carl von Gontard between 1771 and 1772 at Humboldtstraße 5/6 in Potsdam. Its main façade faces the Alter Markt with the Potsdam City Palace and the St. Nicholas church.

The building was named after the Palazzo Barberini in Rome, which the king had chosen as a model. The Potsdam recreation of the Italian model formed the monumental south-eastern end of the Alter Markt and, together with the neighboring Noacksches Haus at Humboldtstraße 4, also designed by Gontard, was one of the last buildings to be built around the square under Frederick II. In the middle of the 19th century, the palace building was extended by two side wings at the rear facing the Havel according to designs by Ludwig Persius and Ludwig Ferdinand Hesse and used as a venue for Potsdam's cultural and club life.

The Palast Barberini was largely destroyed in an air raid on April 14, 1945 and the ruins were demolished during the Soviet Occupation Zone. The site was then used as a green space and parking lot for a long time. As part of the redevelopment of the center of Potsdam with the reconstruction of the city palace as a new state parliament building and other buildings in the neighborhood, the Palast Barberini was rebuilt from 2013 to the end of 2016 with an exterior largely based on the original for use as the art gallery Museum Barberini after donations from the entrepreneur Hasso Plattner.

== Location ==
The site of the Palast Barberini belonged to the medieval settlement core of the city of Potsdam in the vicinity of the Havel crossing and the castle complex located on the later site of the palace.. The city views of the 17th and early 18th centuries show the dense development of this area. Further details of the predecessor buildings that certainly existed are not known.

The building stood on the south side of the Alter Markt within the closed street of Humboldtstraße, which continued east of the square with Brauerstraße. Old maps show the street running from the city-side end of the Long Bridge in a north-easterly direction to the Alter Markt, which disappeared after the demolition of the ruins of the city palace in 1960 and the development on the south side. The so-called Knobelsdorffhaus, now incorporated into the Old Town Hall complex, with the former address Brauerstraße 10, today marks the corner of this otherwise also lost street and the Alter Markt.

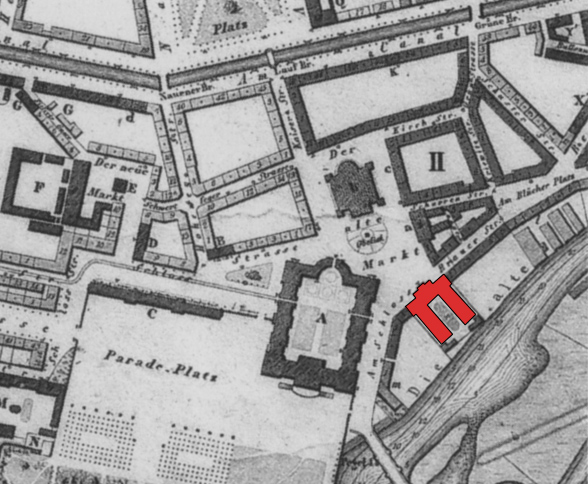
Part of a plan of Potsdam by Heinrich Berghaus (around 1850): Palast Barberini marked in red

The north-western boundary of the street, which was named Schloss-Straße or Schloss-Gasse on 18th century plans, was formed by a side wing of the city palace, while the development of town houses in the south-east with their commercially used side wings occupied the space up to the Havel. Manger's Baugeschichte von Potsdam describes the location with the words am alten Markte unweit des Schlosses (at the old market square not far from the palace)". In the course of the introduction of house numbers in Potsdam after 1806, the houses were given the address "Am Schloss 5/6", then Humboldtstraße 5/6 from 1874.

== Name ==
The Palast Barberini was the only building in Potsdam to be constructed according to a foreign model that was familiar not only to art-historically educated circles but also to the general public under the name of its model. While a copy of Andrea Palladio's Palazzo Valmarana in Vicenza, built in 1754 on the corner of Schlossstraße and Hohewegstraße, was known to the general public as the Plögerscher Gasthof or Kommandantur, and the recreation of a design by Inigo Jones for Whitehall Palace in Breite Straße was called Hiller-Brandtsche Häuser after the first owners, the name Palast Barberini remained alive among Potsdam's inhabitants and was also registered as such on various city maps. A role may have been played here by a mixture with the name of the famous dancer Barberina, who was adored by Frederick II and was engaged at the Royal Opera in Berlin from 1744 to 1749. However, there was no connection to the Potsdam building. The name Palais Barberini can only be found in recent press articles and publications, but not in the urban and art historical literature on Potsdam.

== The palace as a royal urban development ==
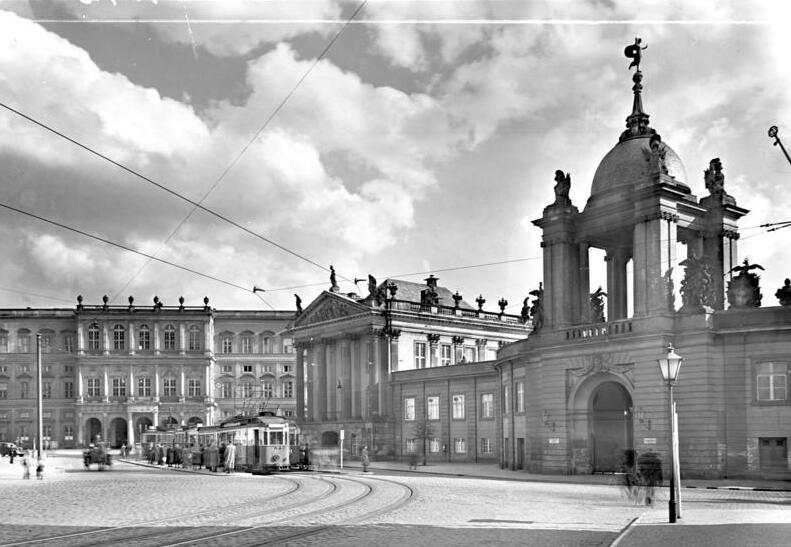
Photo of the Alter Markt looking south around 1930: Palast Barberini in the background on the left, Potsdam City Palace with the Fortuna Portal on the right

Under King Frederick William I, large parts of the old town were renovated and provided with simple half-timbered or solid buildings. His son Frederick II had these buildings gradually replaced by more magnificent buildings from 1748 onwards. This was done on the basis of the city palace and exclusively according to specifications developed from the king's perspective and often according to foreign models selected by Frederick II. It was of secondary importance whether the models selected by the king had actually been realized at the original location.

The main focus was on Italian Renaissance and Mannerist buildings, but English and French buildings were also adapted for Potsdam's conditions. As these models had originally been planned for completely different purposes and classes of inhabitants, there were always glaring contradictions between the needs and financial possibilities of the bourgeois users and the royal desire for representation, especially as the king also urged the greatest possible economy: "If only great lords, especially those who, in addition to their pleasure, also build for the best of their subjects, did not want to look so much at miserable savings! how great would be the benefit for them as a result! especially in Potsdam, where palaces are built for poor citizens, whose subsistence often amounts to more than the entire benefit of renting and purchasing."

When the Palast Barberini was built between 1771 and 1772, the redesign of the remaining square fronts of the Alter Markt had long been completed and the renewal of more distant districts was already underway. Only the adjoining house at Humboldtstraße 4 to the southwest was not rebuilt until 1777. The house at Humboldtstraße 3, modeled on the Palazzo Pompei in Verona designed by Michele Sanmicheli around 1530, was built as early as 1754, as was the adjoining row of houses at Brauerstraße 1-6 to the northeast.

Friedrich Mielke assumes that the king did not have an adequate model that would have corresponded to the exposed urban location. In addition, the Seven Years' War (1756-1763) brought building activity in Potsdam to a virtual standstill.. The fact that the above-mentioned neighboring buildings could be seen more easily from the palace may also have played a role: The house at Humboldtstraße 3 was opposite a passageway to the palace courtyard, while the row of houses at Brauerstraße 1-6 was more visible from the Fortuna portal than the actual south side of the market

After the destruction caused by the war and subsequent demolitions, only the Old Town Hall from 1753, the neighboring house at Brauerstraße 10 and the Hiller-Brandt houses in Breite Straße, built in 1769 according to plans by Georg Christian Unger, have survived in Potsdam as examples of imitation of foreign models. The Palast Barberini stood at the end of the era of copied palace façades. In the 1770s and 1780s, the work of Ungers, Andreas Ludwig Krüger, Johann Gottlob Schulze and others led to an independent development of late Baroque town houses in Potsdam, which met the requirements of the users in terms of appearance and function.

=== Design ===
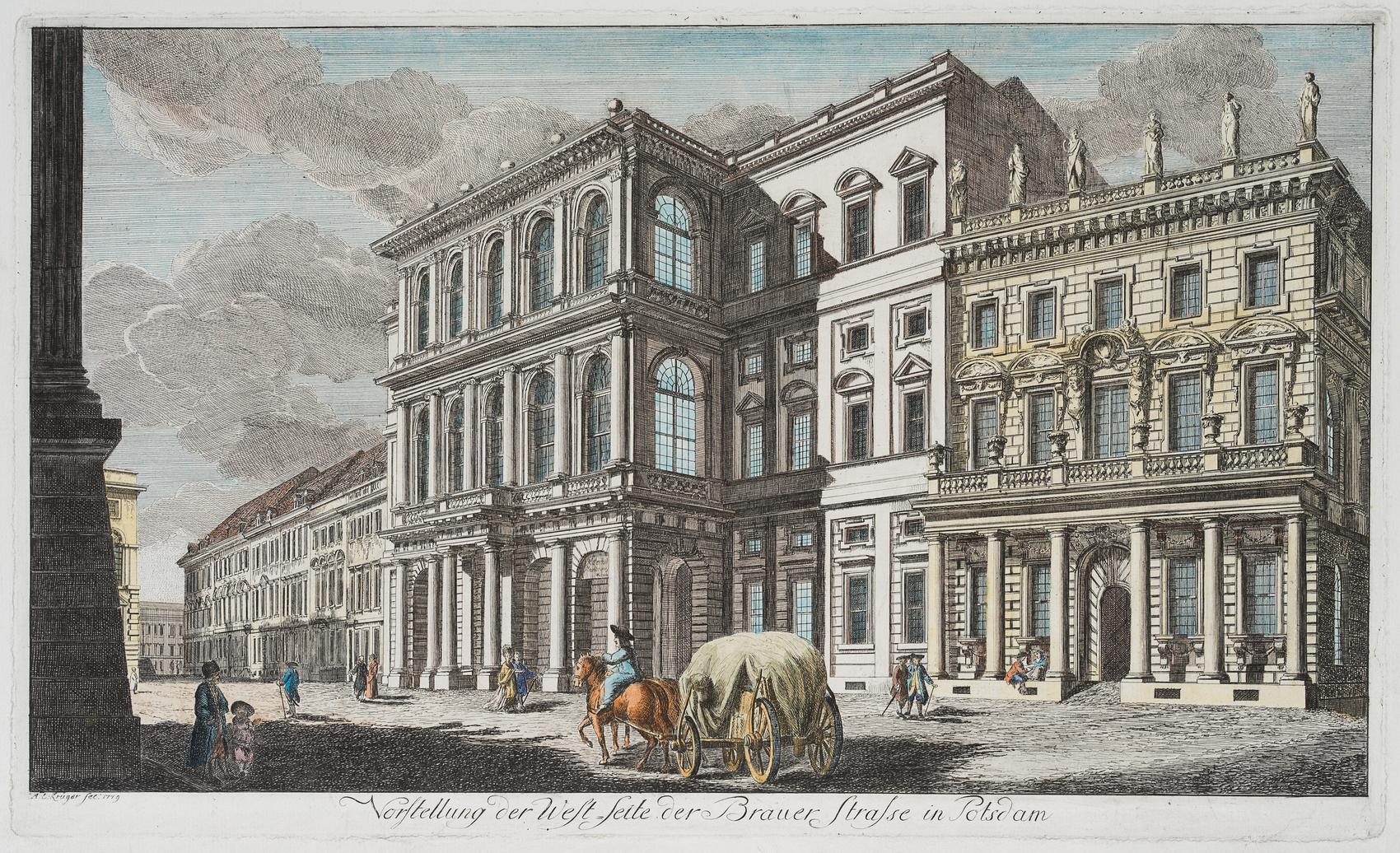
'Representation of the west side of Brauer Straße in Potsdam', engraving by Andreas Ludwig Krüger, 1779, with Palast Barberini on the left and Humboldtstraße 4, built in 1777, on the right.

The design of the house, inhabited by master carpenter Naumann and innkeeper Berkholz, is attributed to Carl von Gontard, although Georg Christian Unger's collaboration is also considered. The architects used the Palazzo Barberini in Rome, which was built from 1625 onwards based on designs by Carlo Maderno, Gianlorenzo Bernini and Francesco Borromini and which Gontard most likely knew from his own experience, as a model. Mielke also cites parallels to an illustration in Paul Decker's masterpiece Fürstlicher Baumeister... from the beginning of the 18th century, which was created under the influence of the Roman building and which was known to Frederick II from his library.

=== Description of the building ===
The Palast Barberini consisted of two three-storey town houses combined behind a uniform façade, which were built at royal expense to replace simpler previous buildings in order to give the Alter Markt the representative appearance desired by the king. The façade had thirteen window axes, the middle five of which formed a protruding avant-corps, whose architecture clearly distinguished it from the four-axis side wings that were aligned with the street.

The central avant-corps was accentuated by a storey-by-storey arrangement of Tuscan, Ionic and Corinthian columns. On the first floor and second floor, these were designed as three-quarter columns. The second floor, on the other hand, was structured with pilasters, each of which was accompanied by two half pilasters that appeared to be pushed back. Large arched windows appeared in the backs of the upper storeys, while the first floor of the avant-corps was open in arched positions. The central window of the second floor was given an altar with a baluster parapet on two full columns standing in front of the façade.

The four-axis side wings each took up the structure of the avant-corps in a simplified form. Here, this was achieved on the ground and second floors with flat pilaster strips, while the smooth wall surface dominated on the second floor. In addition to the three main storeys, the lower two storeys in the side wings each had a low mezzanine storey that opened onto the street with framed rectangular windows. The windows of the main storeys had straight roofs on the first floor and alternating triangular and segmental arched roofs on the upper storeys. The upper end was formed by a parapet, which was decorated with balusters in the avant-corps and crowned with vases. The flat pitched roof of the house was largely concealed by the parapet.

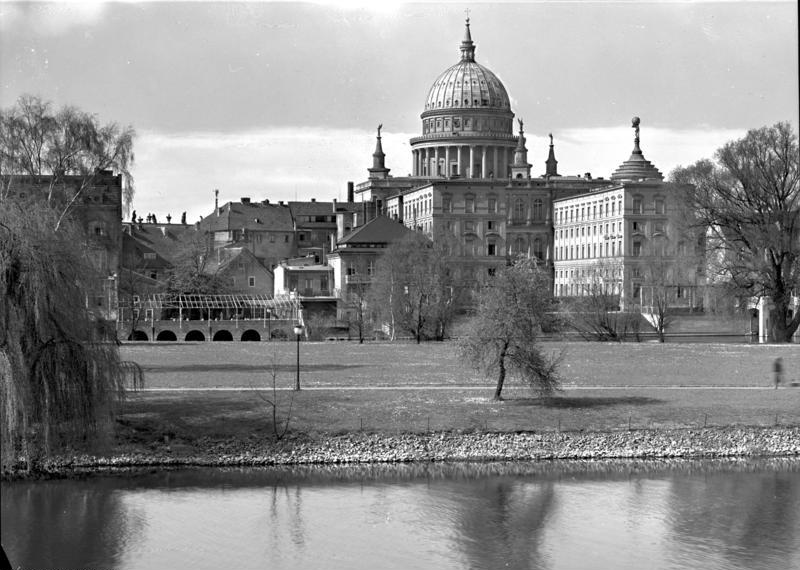
Photo of the banks of the Havel looking north around 1930: the side wings at the back of the Palast Barberini, with St. Nikolai Church and the Old Town Hall behind it

At the time of their construction, the rear of the town houses facing the Havel was simple and not emphasized by a special architectural language, as only subordinate farm buildings were located here. The two long side wings of twelve to three axes each, which were added to the rear of the buildings in the 19th century in the course of their conversion, followed the street-side wings in terms of their division into storeys and formal language. However, the formation of a parapet was dispensed with here. A cornice zone with small openings to the attic was arranged under the flat hipped roof. Only the three axes of the long sides at the ends on the Havel side and the front sides of the wings had window roofs, giving the impression of end buildings. The rear of the central building was given a representative façade structure corresponding to the central avant-corps on the street side.

Nothing is known about the layout of the interior rooms when the main building was constructed between 1771 and 1772 due to a lack of surviving documents. During the conversion and extension work between 1845 and 1849, the apartments previously housed in the main building were moved to the new side wings, a passageway with columns was created on the first floor of the central building to meet the increased representational requirements and several richly decorated halls were built on its upper floors. The courtyard on the Havel side between the side wings was landscaped. A wide perron led from here to the riverbank. The L-shaped outbuildings visible on the 19th century floor plan, which were symmetrically arranged in the extension of the side wings and contained stables and toilets, were later replaced by pergolas.

=== Construction ===
At the time of the construction of the Palast Barberini, it was customary in Potsdam for the residents affected by the royal remodeling measures to leave their old houses in the spring and move into the new building in the fall. In contrast, construction, which began in 1771, dragged on until 1772 due to the size of the project. Manger also reports that the two houses behind the monumental façade were built by different master builders, with one part collapsing due to negligent work during the construction period, in which "several [workers] died on the spot". The king reacted ungraciously to the case, "and yet his clemency went so far that he did not come to this area again until everything was in a finished state, so that he could then express his satisfaction with the workmanship".

=== Model: Palazzo Barberini (Rome) ===
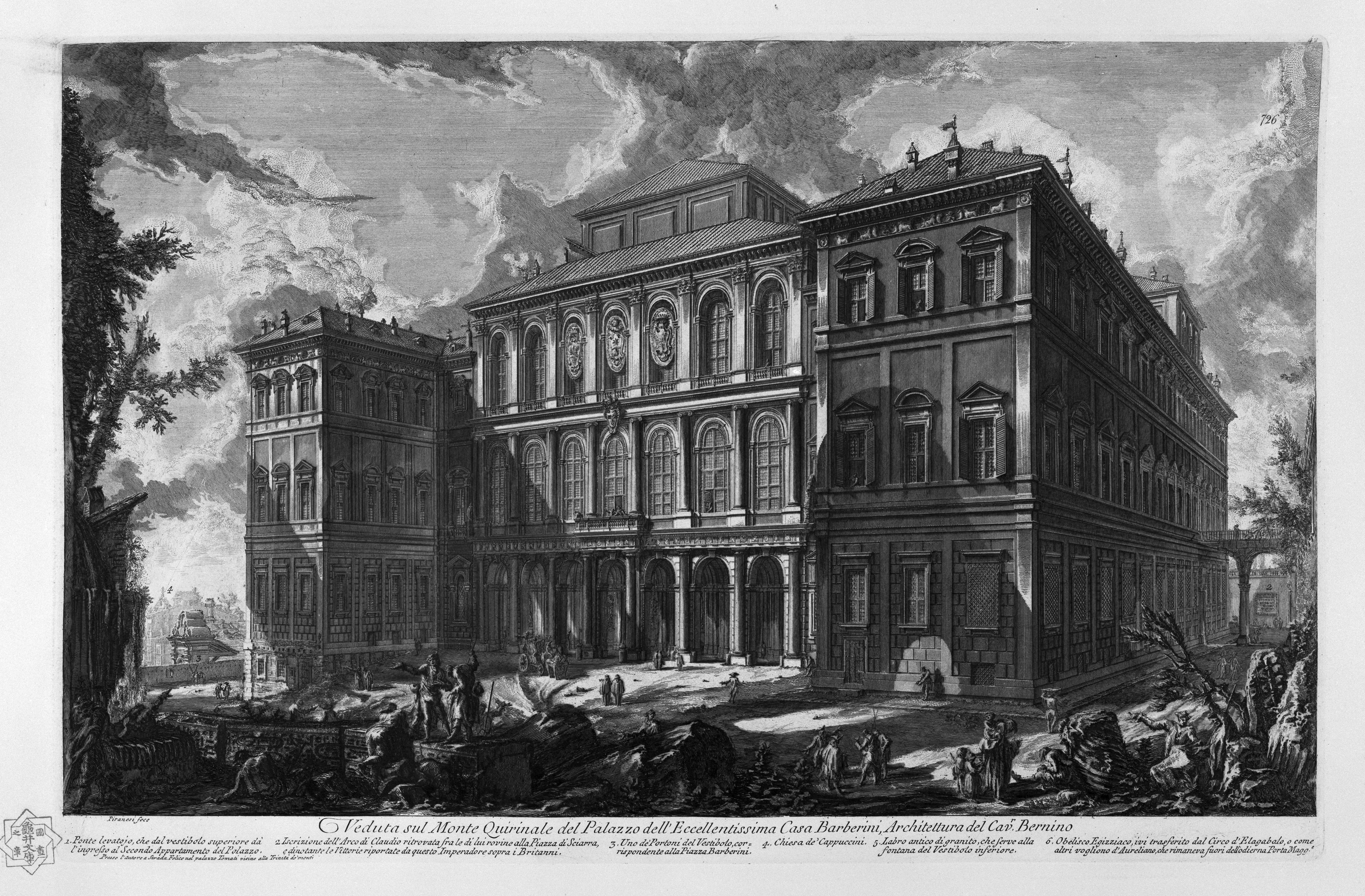
Rome, Palazzo Barberini, engraving by Giovanni Battista Piranesi, c. 1748

The model chosen by the king is a monumental Baroque palace which, unlike other examples of Roman palace architecture, stands freely on a large plot of land and is not integrated into a street or a square structure. For this reason, the central building was enclosed by two projecting side wings that form a courtyard of honor. In Potsdam, the side wings were set back instead in order to allow the central avant-corps, which here has five instead of seven axes, to act as a focal point in the street space of Humboldtstrasse and Brauerstrasse. In addition, the formation of a court of honour would have further obscured the already irregular shape of the Alter Markt square and would not have been in keeping with Potsdam's building customs.

The Palazzo Barberini in Rome has no mezzanine floors. These were added in Potsdam in order to make use of the oversized building volume for town houses, but also to reduce the heating costs of the generously proportioned rooms. However, the low mezzanine floors of the Potsdam townhouses, which were built according to foreign designs, often resulted in very inadequate living conditions.

In Potsdam, the roof was concealed by a parapet, whereas in the Palazzo Barberini in Rome, it was placed directly above the main cornice and still had superstructures. Finally, the Potsdam replica did not have an architectural design at the rear, which in the original was designed as a picturesque asymmetrical garden front.

The Roman model was not always mentioned correctly. In 1786, Friedrich Nicolai described the "Schulzische und Dieckowsche Haus, an imitation of the Palazzo Borghese in Rome", whereby he also documented an early change of ownership by mentioning the occupants by name. Manger repeats Nicolai's information in his description of the building. The name "Palast Barberini" does not appear in Manger's architectural history until he discusses the neighboring house at Humboldtstraße 4. Since then, the side wings facing the street have repeatedly been associated with the Palazzo Borghese. However, Andreas Ludwig Krüger wrote as early as 1779 that Unger had drawn according to the model of the Palazzo Barberini and that the side wings were "composed in addition", so that the eponymous palazzo appears to be the only model. However, the architecture of the side wings and in particular the arrangement of the mezzanine floors are strongly oriented towards the Palazzo Borghese, so that a compilation of both Roman buildings could also be present.

Although the design of the Palast Barberini was closely based on a Roman model built almost 150 years earlier, it nevertheless blended in with Potsdam's bourgeois architecture and the ensemble of the Alter Markt, which was based on Italian models. This can be explained, on the one hand, by the more classicist approach of the Roman palazzo, which avoids spectacular sweeps and dramatic contrasts, and, on the other, by the almost exclusively tectonic rather than decorative structure of the building.

== Destruction and demolition ==
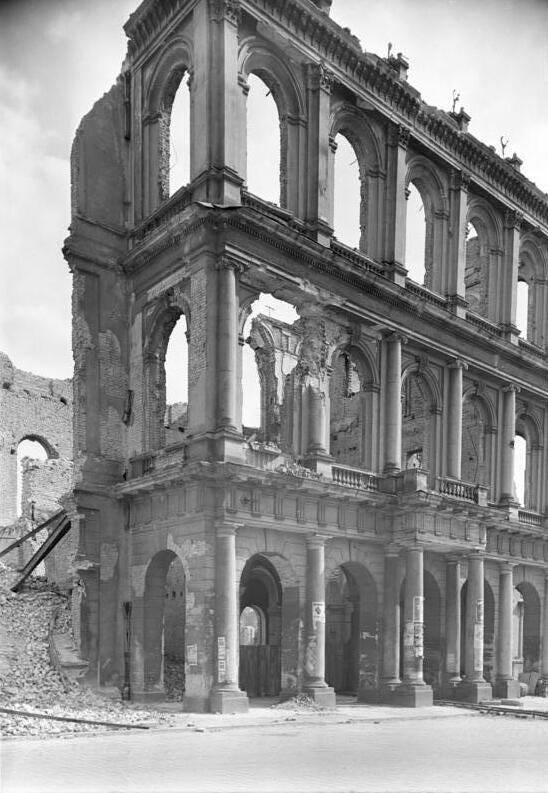
Ruins of the Palast Barberini, after 1945

During the Western Allied air raid on Potsdam on April 14, 1945 and the subsequent artillery battles with the Red Army, the Palast Barberini was badly damaged and burned out. Due to the severe damage, it was not rebuilt as demanded by various parties; the ruins were demolished together with the palace hotel on March 24, 1948. The unimplemented reconstruction plan for Potsdam from 1952 shows a "sculpture grove" on the cleared land of the Palast Barberini and the neighboring buildings that were also destroyed, which was probably intended for the installation of sculptures from the buildings destroyed in the war. During the GDR era, the area served as a green space and parking lot despite various plans to build cultural facilities such as a theater or city hall. A riverside promenade was built along the Havel.

From 1994 to 2006, the interim venue of the Hans Otto Theatre was located on the site of the Palast Barberini.

== Reconstruction ==
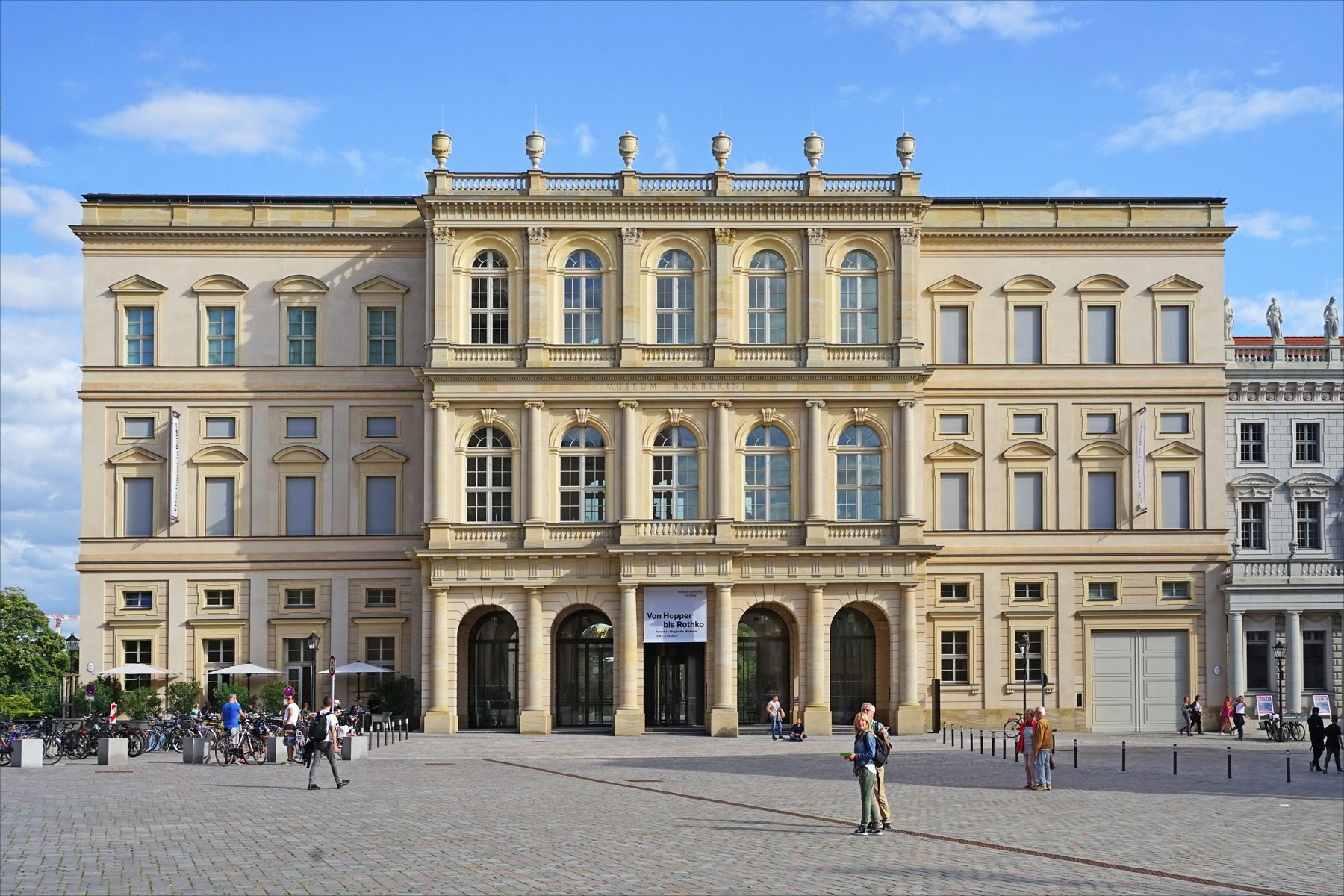
Reconstructed Palast Barberini, 2017

In connection with the redesign of Potsdam's old city center and the rebuilding of the City Palace as the seat of the Brandenburg State Parliament, the former Humboldtstraße was also rebuilt and the Alter Markt closed off to the south. The Palast Barberini was intended as the "lead building" for the restoration based on the original, even though the original substance of the town hall, Knobelsdorff House and St. Nicholas Church have been preserved in the immediate vicinity.

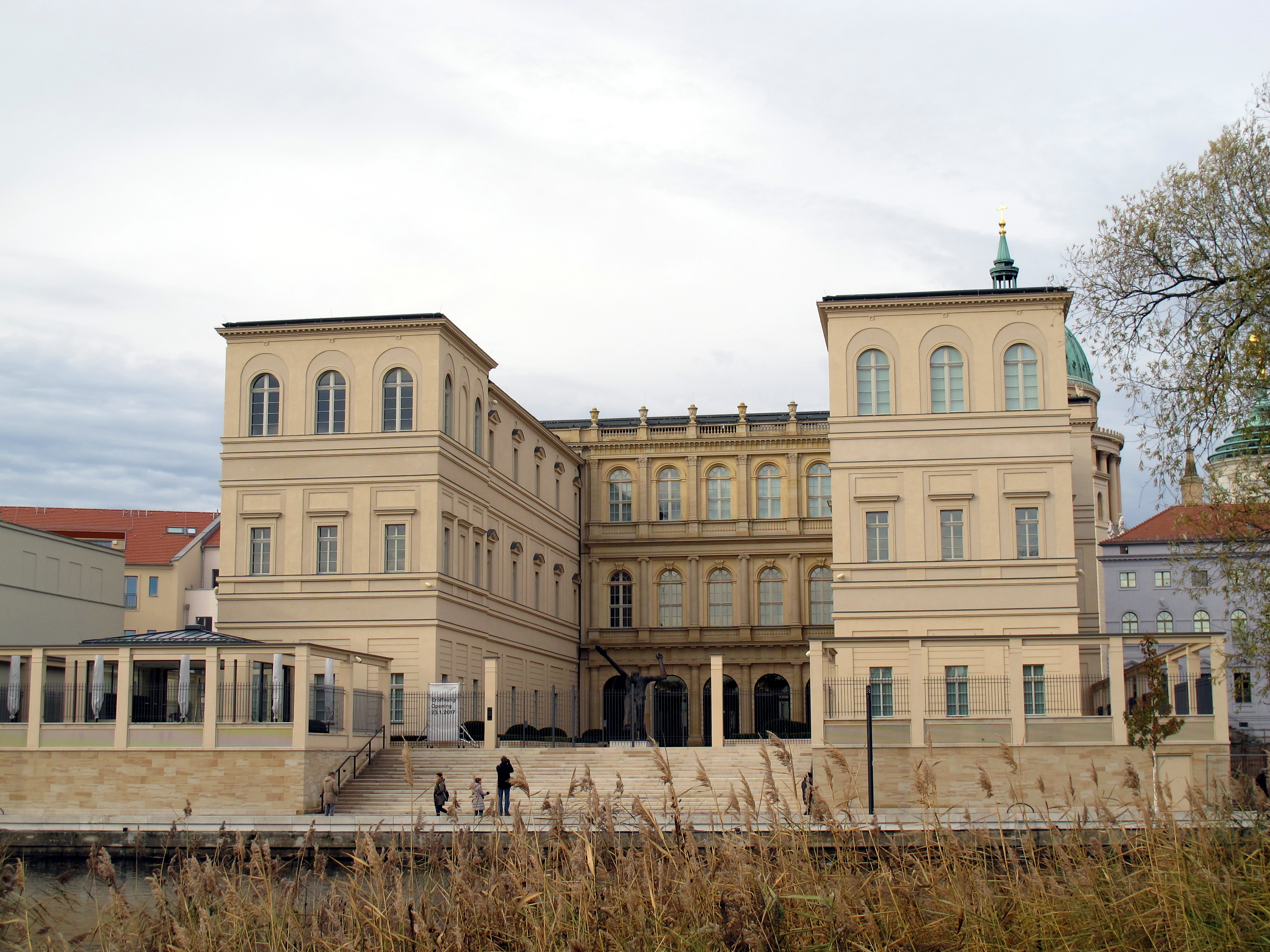
Back view of the building, 2016

Following a referendum in the Brandenburg state parliament in 2005, the decision was made to rebuild the Potsdam City Palace on the Alter Markt and at the same time initiated the public debate on the "recovery" of Potsdam's historic center. In workshops with the participation of experts and citizens' initiatives, the integrated flagship building concept for Potsdam's city center was developed and adopted by the city councillors on September 1, 2010 as a guideline for the bidding competition for the sale of municipal land on the Havelufer and Alter Fahrt. The contract for the Palast Barberini was awarded to the Berlin entrepreneur Abris Lelbach, who, with the Hasso Plattner Foundation as a partner, began building a museum for Hasso Plattner's art collection on the Humboldtstraße 5/6 site with the flagship building. Thomas Albrecht from Hilmer & Sattler und Albrecht was the architect responsible for the museum building in the shape of the reconstructed Palast Barberini.

The lead building concept stipulated the reconstruction of the square façades and the courtyard façade of the central building as well as adherence to the original cubic shape of the building. The facades to be restored were made using traditional craftsmanship techniques. As with the original building, the Elbe sandstone for the columns and façade decoration comes from Saxony (Posta) and Bohemia (Königgrätz). Another special feature of the craftsmanship is the production of the columns and ceilings in the entrance hall using Rabitz plaster, in which the gypsum plaster is drawn out over a supporting mesh to form surfaces and ornaments.

The topping-out ceremony for the new building was held on April 17, 2015. The shell of the building, including the façade, was completed in November 2015; the interior work was completed in 2016.

== Use ==
=== 19th and 20th century ===
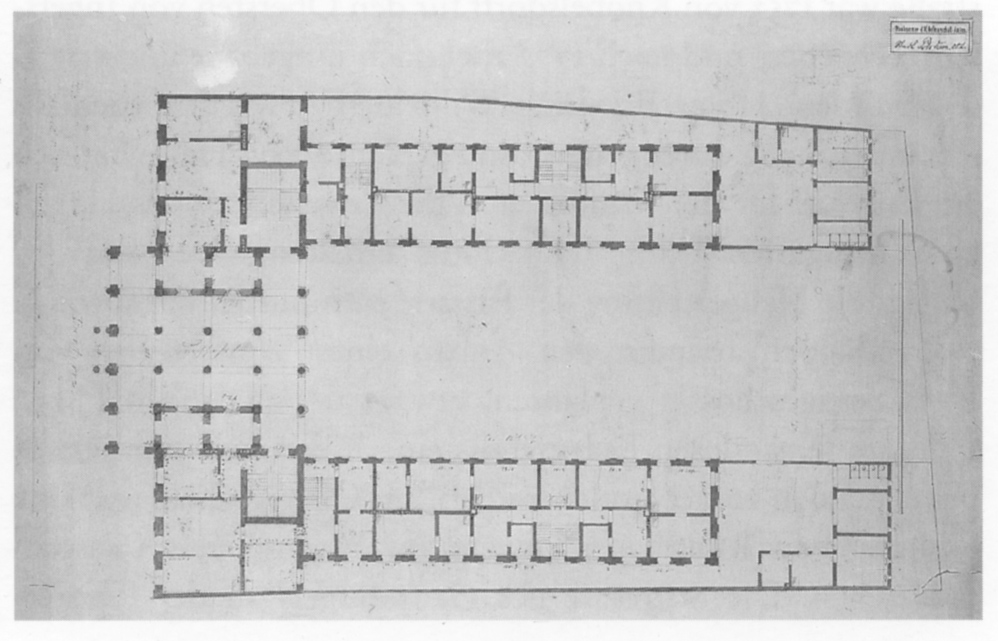
Rudolf Hesse (?): Floor plan of the first floor, around 1850

From 1845, the Palast Barberini was extensively remodeled on behalf of King Frederick William IV. The king had been pursuing plans since 1843 to incorporate the banks of the Havel into his plans to embellish Potsdam by redesigning the unsightly rear of the building. However, he did not buy the house himself for this purpose, but supported the Potsdam master masons Christian Heinrich Zech (1798-1858) and Adolph Wilhelm Hecker (1805-1870), who were also interested in the purchase, with 80,000 thalers. They purchased the building for 27,300 thalers and used the remaining money to carry out extensive renovations. The owners undertook to allow the ""Art and Science Association"" to use rooms in the remodeled front building free of charge for "eternity". The plans drawn up by Ludwig Persius in 1844, which were amended several times by the king, were approved by Frederick William IV on January 1, 1845.

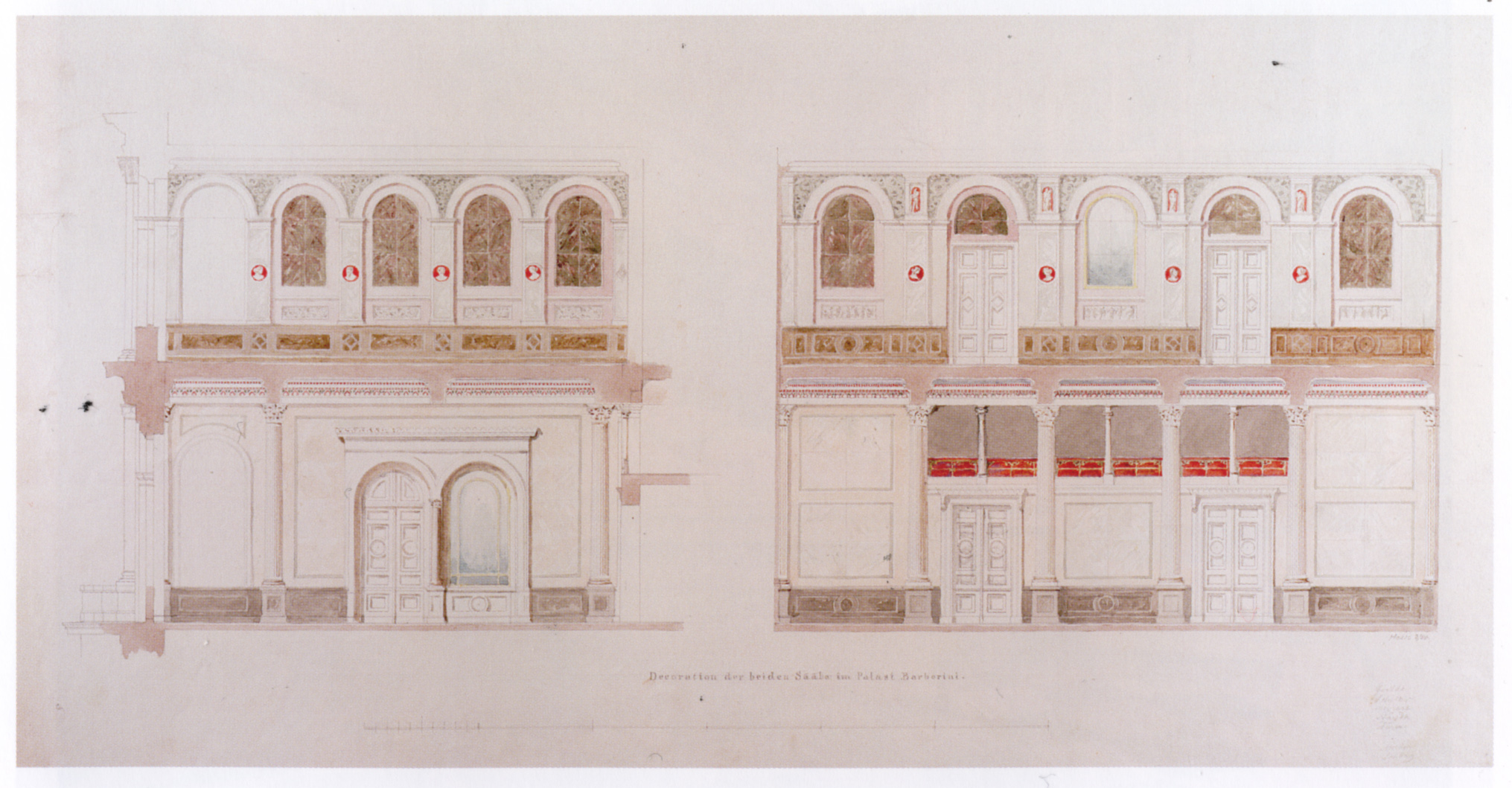
Ludwig Ferdinand Hesse: Decoration of the two halls, 1850

The previously divided buildings behind the palace façade were merged, a representative passageway flanked by stairs was created to the courtyard, a hall with adjoining rooms was created on the second and third floors and the two rear side wings were added for residential use. After Persius' sudden death in 1845, Friedrich August Stüler initially took over the supervision of the building. From 1847, Ludwig Ferdinand Hesse, appointed court architect, was responsible for the still outstanding design of the richly decorated interiors. In 1851, the premises were handed over to the Potsdam clubs for use. The construction of a promenade on the banks of the Havel, as desired by the king, did not take place as the owners of the neighboring properties demanded high prices. Frederick William IV's plan to close off the courtyard, which was open to the river, with an arcaded hall was also not realized for financial reasons, even though the king guaranteed to cover the costs of the construction at a later date.

For the owners, however, the investment in the extension and conversion of the Palast Barberini became a loss-making business, as they repeatedly applied to the king for support funds "to cover the additional capital required". The building changed hands in 1877, 1880 and 1891. In 1912, the city of Potsdam bought the building and set up office space for the city administration in 1916. In the 1930s, the right wing was used as a youth hostel; from 1938, the left wing was also used for this purpose.

=== 21st century ===
Since its reconstruction in 2017, the building has been home to the Museum Barberini. In addition to changing special exhibitions with a focus on Impressionism, it permanently exhibits a collection of art from the German Democratic Republic and art after 1989.

The non-profit organization Stadtbild Deutschland awarded the reconstruction of the Palast Barberini as an art gallery the title "Building of the Year 2016".

== Bibliography ==
- Astrid Fick: Potsdam – Berlin – Bayreuth. Carl Philipp Christian von Gontard (1731–1791) und seine bürgerlichen Wohnhäuser, Immediatbauten und Stadtpalais. Imhof, Petersberg 2000, ISBN 978-3-932526-42-8.
- Heinrich Ludwig Manger: Heinrich Ludewig Manger’s Baugeschichte von Potsdam, besonders unter der Regierung König Friedrichs des Zweiten.Second volume. Berlin und Stettin 1789; archive.org. Reprint Leipzig 1987.
- Friedrich Mielke: Das Bürgerhaus in Potsdam. Tübingen 1972, ISBN 978-3-8030-0017-0, and978-3-8030-0016-3.
- Friedrich Mielke: Potsdamer Baukunst. Berlin 1998, ISBN 978-3-549-05668-4.
- Ludwig Persius – Architekt des Königs, Baukunst unter Friedrich Wilhelm IV. Published by the Prussian Palaces and Gardens Foundation Berlin-Brandenburg, Potsdam 2003, ISBN 978-3-7954-1586-0.
- Andreas Kitschke (ed.): Ludwig Ferdinand Hesse (1795–1876). Hofarchitekt unter drei preußischen Königen. 1st edition. Deutscher Kunstverlag, Munich 2007, ISBN 978-3-422-06611-3.
- Karin Carmen Jung: Potsdam. Am Neuen Markt. Ereignisgeschichte, Städtebau, Architektur. Gebrüder Mann, Berlin 1999, ISBN 978-3-7861-2307-1.
