= Allegory of Divine Providence and Barberini Power =

Fresco by Pietro da Cortona

- Triumph of Divine Providence
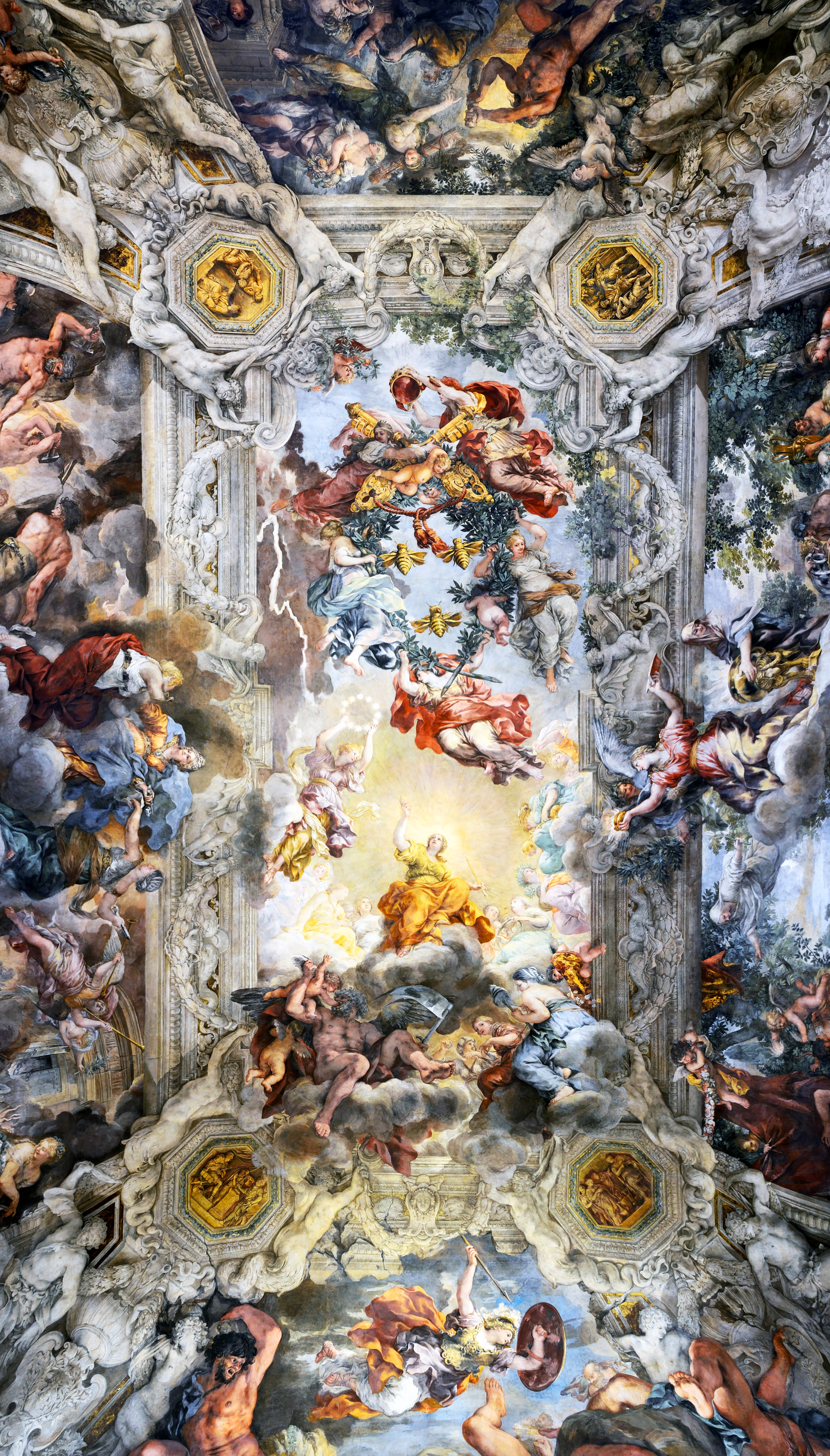
- Artist: Pietro da Cortona
- Year: c. 1633–1639
- Type: Fresco
- Location: Galleria Nazionale d'Arte Antica (Palazzo Barberini), Rome

The Allegory of Divine Providence and Barberini Power is a fresco by the Italian Baroque painter Pietro da Cortona, filling the large ceiling of the grand salon of the Palazzo Barberini in Rome, Italy. Begun in 1633, it was nearly finished in three years; upon Cortona's return from Venice, it was extensively reworked to completion in 1639. The Palazzo, since the 1620s, had been the palatial home of the Barberini family headed by Maffeo Barberini, by then Urban VIII, who had launched an extensive program of refurbishment of the city with art and architecture.

== Composition ==
These commissioned artworks often teem with suns and bees (the Barberini family coat of arms had three bees), as also the Cortona fresco does. At one end of the sky sits the eminent solar Divine Providence, while at the other end are putto and flying maidens holding aloft the papal keys, tiara, with robe belt above a swarm of heraldic giant golden bees. Below Providence, the simulated frame crumbles. Time with a scythe seems to swallow a putto's arm. As the graceful bearer of the twelve stars that constitute Crown of Immortality is unequivocally extending it to the heraldic swarm, she earnestly looks towards Divine Providence. Some scholars have suggested that one of the fresco's goals was to portray the Barberini papal election, which had been rumored to have been rigged, as divine providence. At one edge, are laborers in a forge so hard at work, they shatter the outer frame.

== Critical assessment and legacy ==
Frescoes were numerous in Rome at the time; most represented galleries of framed episodes, quadro riportato such as found on the ceilings of the Sistine Chapel ceiling or in Annibale Carracci's Palazzo Farnese (completed in 1601) cycle. Baldassare Peruzzi had pioneered this style of painting called quadratura, in which the fresco replaces or simulates some of the architectural framework, using often forced perspective. Such trompe-l'œil artifices were not novel to Italian art, since for example Mantegna and Giulio Romano in Mantua had featured such frescoes; however, for Cortona, the luminous sky became a teeming tour de force, a style that influenced many other large fresco spectacles such as those by Tiepolo for example, in Madrid, by Ehrenstrahl in his "Council of the Virtues" from the House of Nobility, in Stockholm and in the frescoes depicting the Apotheosis of the Pisani Family in the Villa Pisani at Stra. Other famous sotto in su frescoes in Rome include Andrea Pozzo's Apotheosis of St Ignatius at the Roman church of Sant'Ignazio.

== See also ==
- Crown of Immortality
