= Corps de logis =

Principal block of a large house, mansion, or palace

Blenheim Palace: "F" marks the corps de logis containing the principal rooms. "A" marks the cour d'honneur, while "B" and "C" are the secondary service wings

In architecture, a corps de logis (French pronunciation: [kɔʁ də lɔʒi]) is the principal or main block, or central building of a mansion, country or manor house, castle, or palace. It contains the rooms of principal business, the state apartments and the ceremonial or formal entry.

The grandest and finest rooms within the corps de logis are often found not at grade level, but on the first or even the second floor above. This floor is often referred to as the Italian piano nobile, the French bel étage, or the German beletage.

The corps de logis is usually flanked by lower, secondary wings, such as the barchesse of Venetian villas. When the secondary wings form a three sided courtyard, the courtyard is known as the cour d'honneur, as opposed to a quadrangle when a fourth wing encloses it.

Examples of a corps de logis can be found in many of the most notable Renaissance, Baroque and Neoclassical civil buildings of Europe including the Palace of Versailles, Blenheim Palace, and the Palazzo Pitti.

== Gallery ==
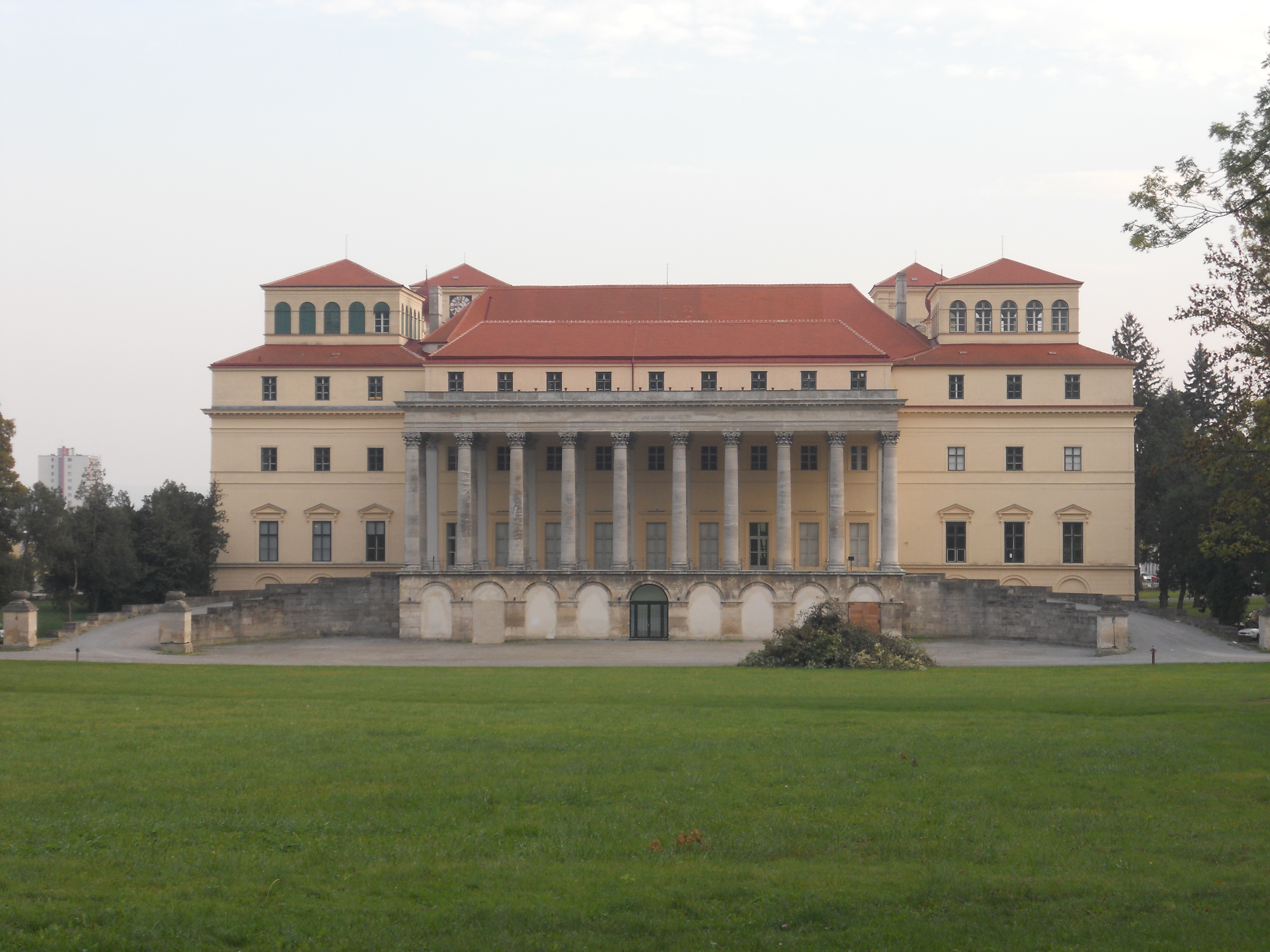
The corps de logis of the Schloss Esterházy, see from the garden

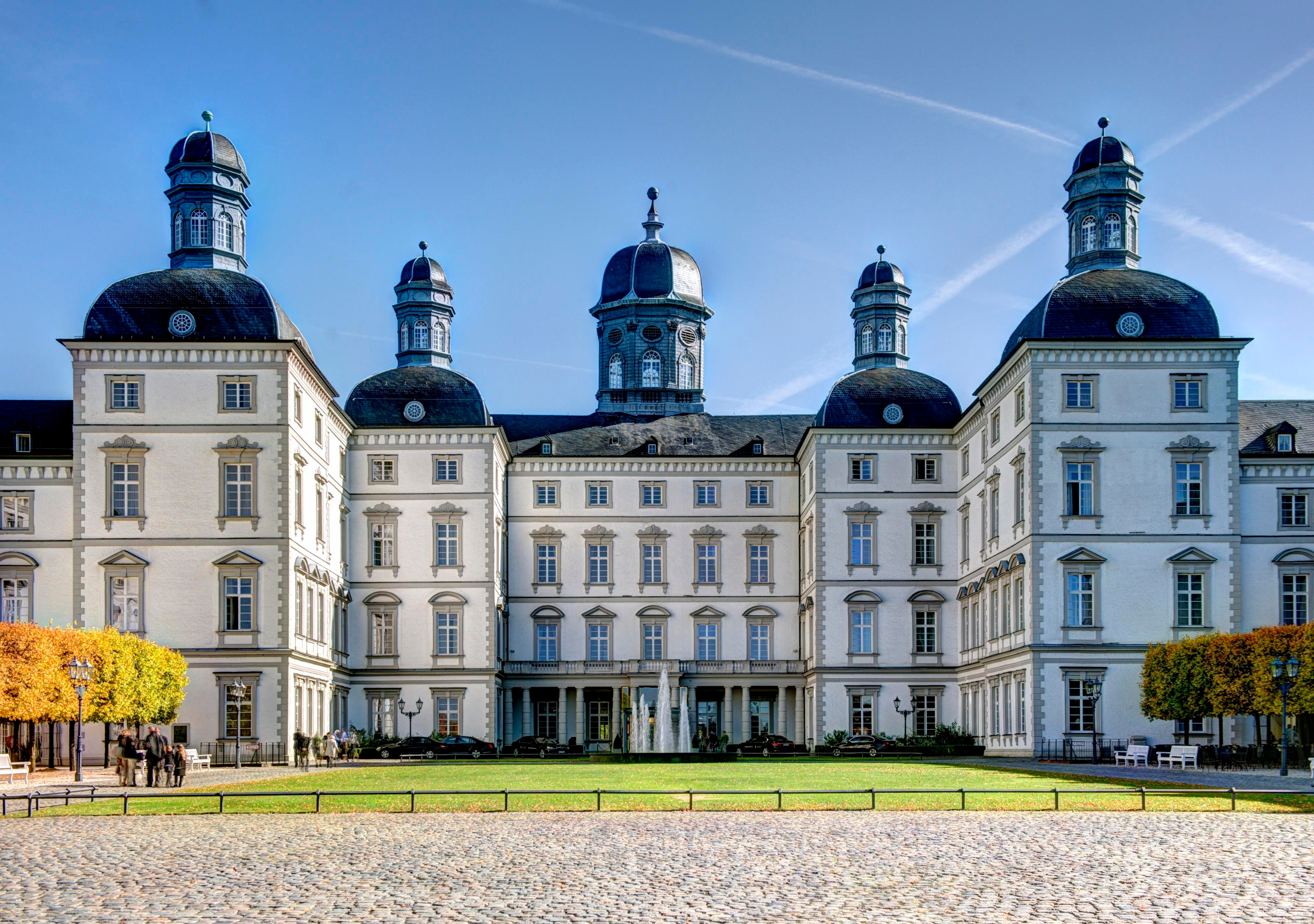
The corps de logis of the Schloss Bensberg, main entrance

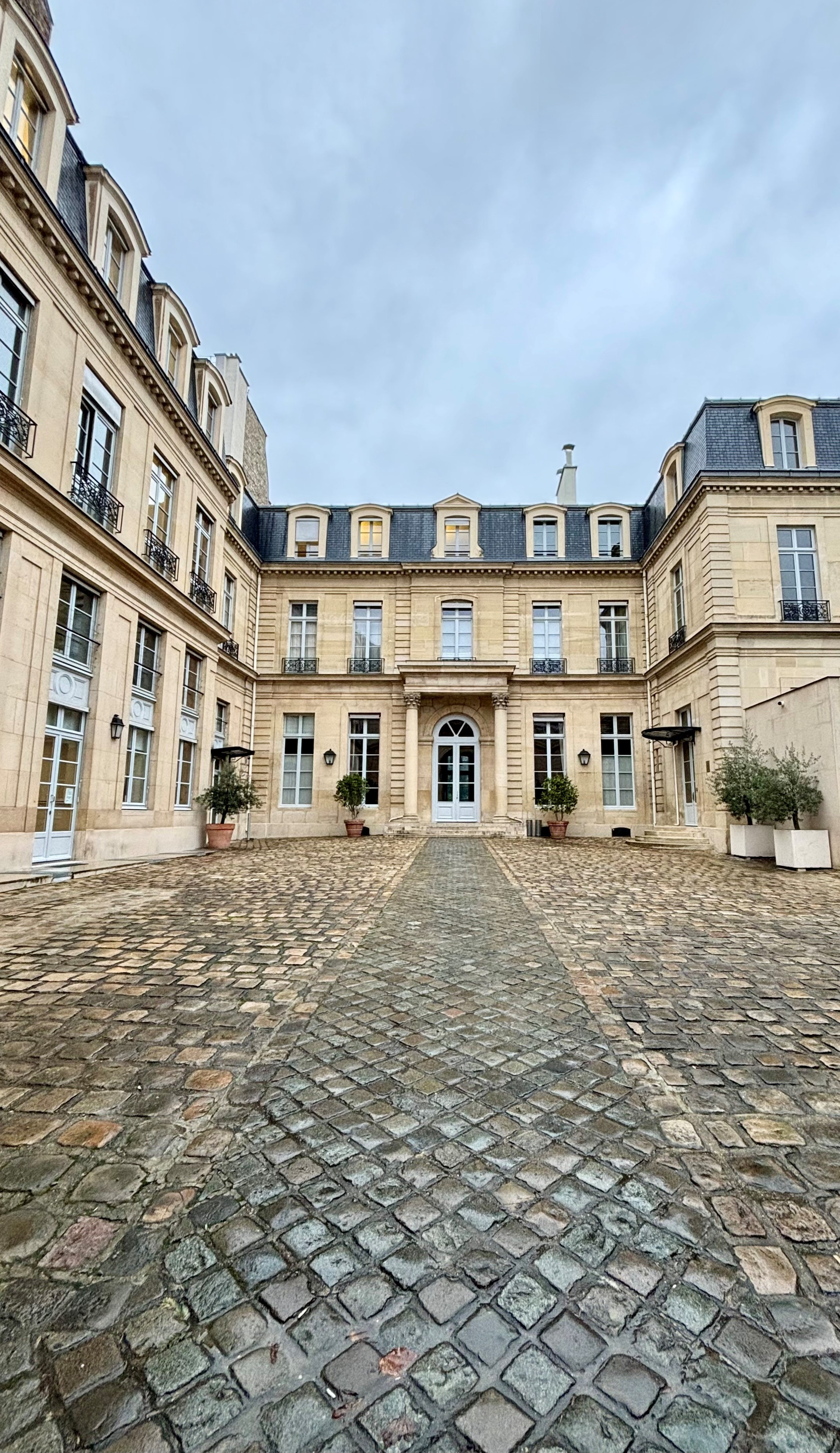
The cour d'honneur and the corps de logis of the Hôtel de Besenval, main entrance

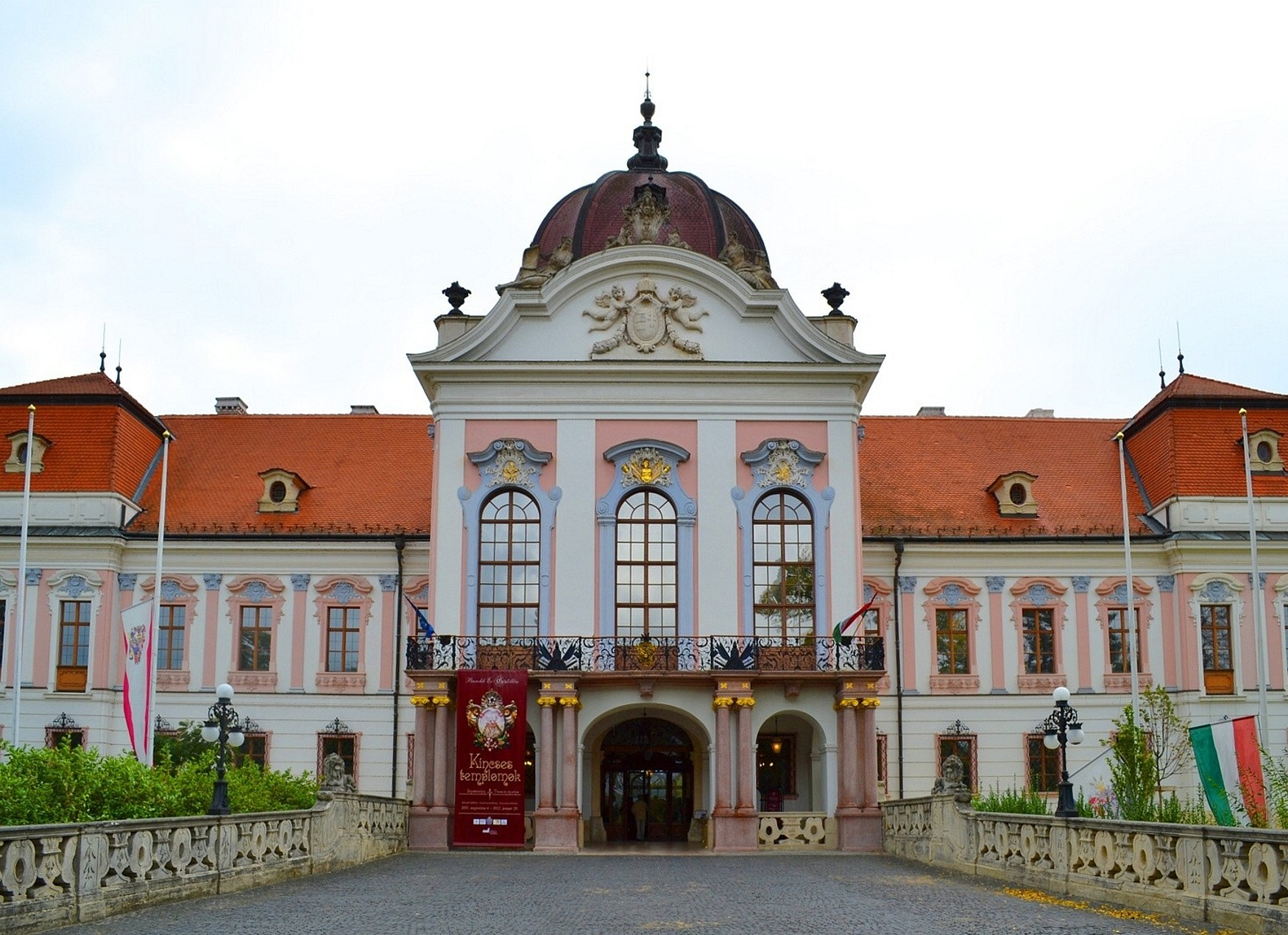
The corps de logis of the Royal Palace of Gödöllő, main entrance
