= Museum Barberini =

Art museum in Potsdam

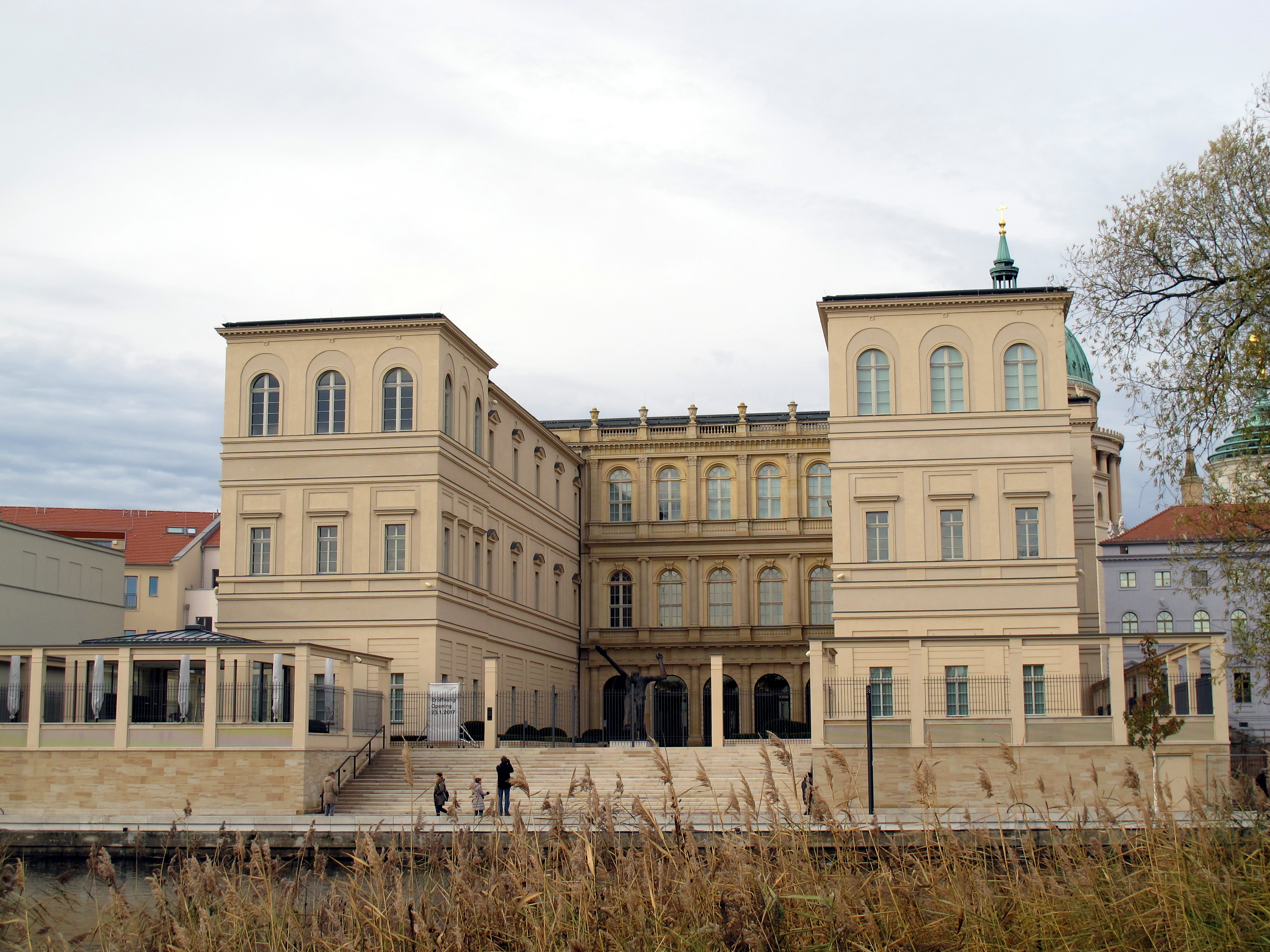
- Museum Barberini in November 2016
- Interactive fullscreen map
- Established: 2017
- Location: Potsdam, Germany
- Coordinates: 52°23′43″N 13°03′44″E
- Website: museum-barberini.de

The Museum Barberini is an art museum in the reconstructed Palast Barberini in Potsdam, which opened in 2017. Its exhibitions range from the so-called Old Masters to contemporary art, with an emphasis on impressionist painting. Centered around works from the collection of its founder and patron Hasso Plattner, the Barberini presents three temporary exhibitions per year, featuring loans from international museums and private collections. Academic conferences serve to prepare these exhibitions. At the same time, shorter gallery displays – the so-called "art histories" – put works from the collection into constantly shifting contexts. The museum aims to offer a diverse programme of events and educational activities as well as digital offers like the Barberini App and the 4K Smart Wall in the museum.

The director of the Museum Barberini is Ortrud Westheider.

== Exhibitions and collection ==
The art gallery exhibits Plattner's collection of art from the former German Democratic Republic, as well as special exhibitions that range from the Old Masters to contemporary art with a focus on impressionism, including works by Rodin, Monet, and Edvard Munch. Three temporary exhibitions are planned each year, with major loan collections from international museums and private collections.

In its opening year in 2017, the Museum Barberini has begun its programme of exhibitions with four major shows, all of which were based on international cooperations and supported by key loans from numerous museums around the world, including the State Hermitage in St. Petersburg, the Musée d'Orsay in Paris and the National Gallery of Art in Washington: Modern Classics, Impressionism: The Art of Landscape, From Hopper to Rothko: America's Road to Modern Art and Behind the Mask: Artists in the GDR. The last of these was based on the museum's collection of the GDR painting, which still occupies a marginalized position in German art history. The show assembled over 100 works by ca. 80 artists active in the fields of painting, photography, collage, sculpture and works on paper.

In 2018, the Barberini's Beckmann retrospective was the first ever show to explore the artist's fascination with the concept of the world as a stage. The exhibition brought together more than 110 works from German and international museums and private collections, including the Harvard Art Museum in Boston, the Museum of Modern Art in New York, the Nationalgalerie in Berlin and the Tate Modern in London, and featured many masterpieces that had hardly been shown in Europe before.

The exhibition Gerhard Richter. Abstraction (Summer 2018) was the first to focus on abstract strategies and procedures in the artist's oeuvre. Inspired by a new acquisition of the Museum Barberini, the critically acclaimed show was developed in close collaboration with the artist and explored the relationship and meanings of abstraction and the object in Richter's work from the 1960s to the present day, including the role of photography and color, overpainting and exposure. The exhibition brought together around 80 works from international museum and private collections, including the Gerhard Richter Archive and the Staatliche Kunstsammlungen in Dresden, the Collezione Prada in Milan and the Fundação de Serralves, Museu de Arte Contemporânea in Porto.

From November 2018 till February 2019, the Barberini hosted the first retrospective of the neo-impressionist painter Henri-Edmond Cross (1856–1910) in Germany. Around 1900, Cross was regarded as one of the most important representatives of the French avant-garde and was known for his light-flooded depictions of the Riviera. The retrospective included numerous neo-impressionist masterpieces from museums such as the Musée d’Orsay in Paris, the National Gallery of Art in Washington, the Museo Nacional Thyssen-Bornemisza in Madrid and the Ny Carlsberg Glyptotek in Copenhagen. Their loans were complemented by selected key works from international private collections that are otherwise not accessible to the public.

From March 9 to June 16, 2019, a major show was dedicated to Picasso's late work, featuring more than 130 works from the collection of his last wife Jacqueline, including paintings, drawings, collages, sculptures and ceramics. From July to October 2019, more than 50 masterpieces from the national galleries Barberini Corsini in Rome could be seen in the show Baroque Pathways, including Caravaggio's painting Narcissus (1597/99). The last exhibition of the year, Van Gogh. Still Lifes (October 2019 – February 2020) was the first ever exhibition on this theme. The show, which was conceived in cooperation with the Kröller-Müller Museum in Otterlo and the Van Gogh Museum in Amsterdam, analyzed the decisive stages in van Gogh's oeuvre and life with over 20 paintings, including major loans from the Art Institute of Chicago and the National Gallery of Art in Washington.

== Publications of the Museum Barberini ==
- Impressionism: The Art of Landscape (2017)
- From Hopper to Rothko: America's Road to Modern Art (2017)
- Behind the Mask: Artists in the GDR (2017)
- Max Beckmann: The World as a Stage (2017)
- Are Communists Allowed to Dream? The Gallery of the Palace of the Republic. A Documentation (2017)
- Gerhard Richter: Abstraction (2018)
- Color and Light: The Neo-Impressionist Henri-Edmond Cross (2018)
- Olympian Gods: From the Dresden Sculpture Collection (2018)
- Picasso: The Late Work (2019)
- Baroque Pathways: The National Galleries Barberini Corsini in Rome (2019)
- Van Gogh: Still Lifes (2019)

== Gallery ==
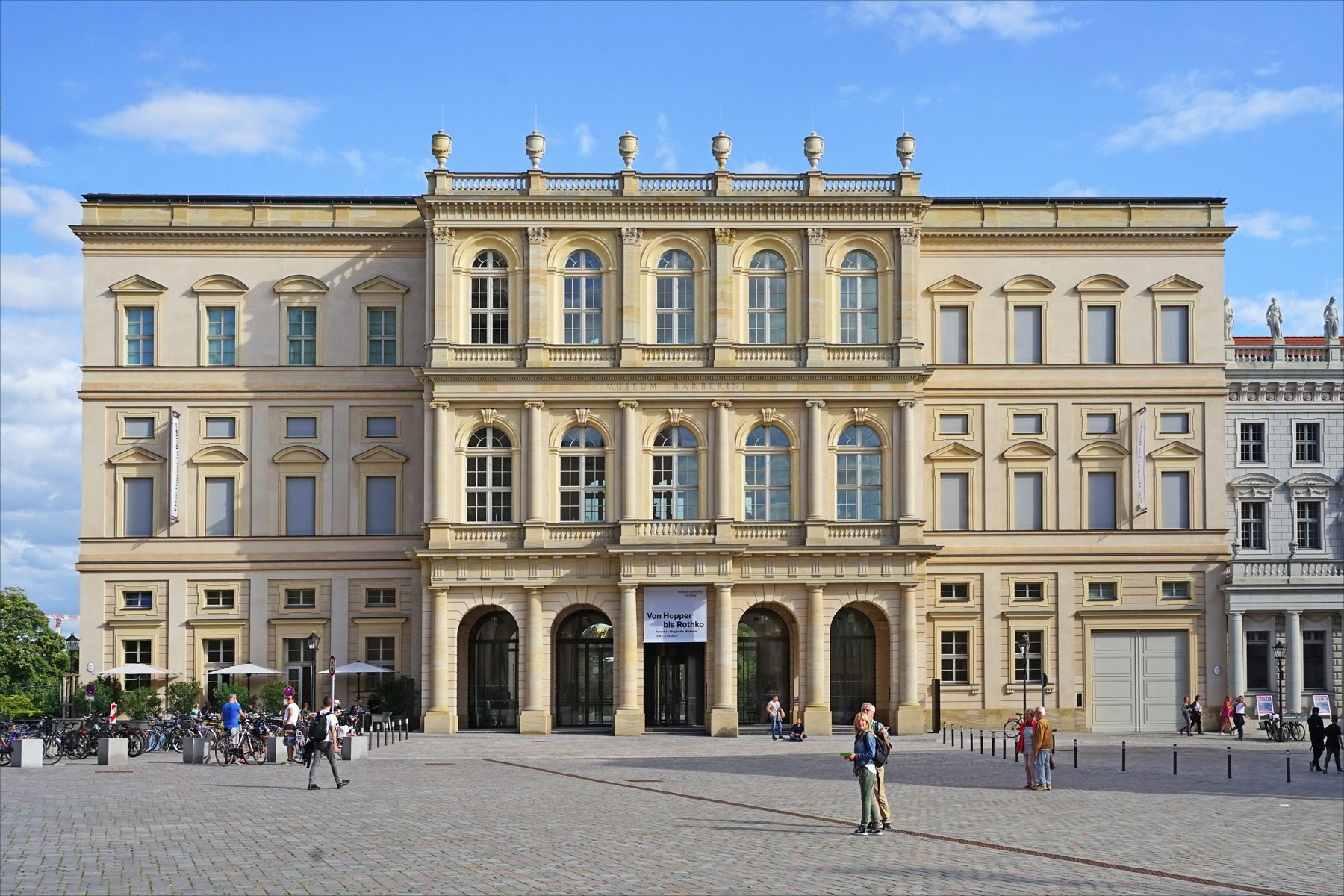
View from the Old Market

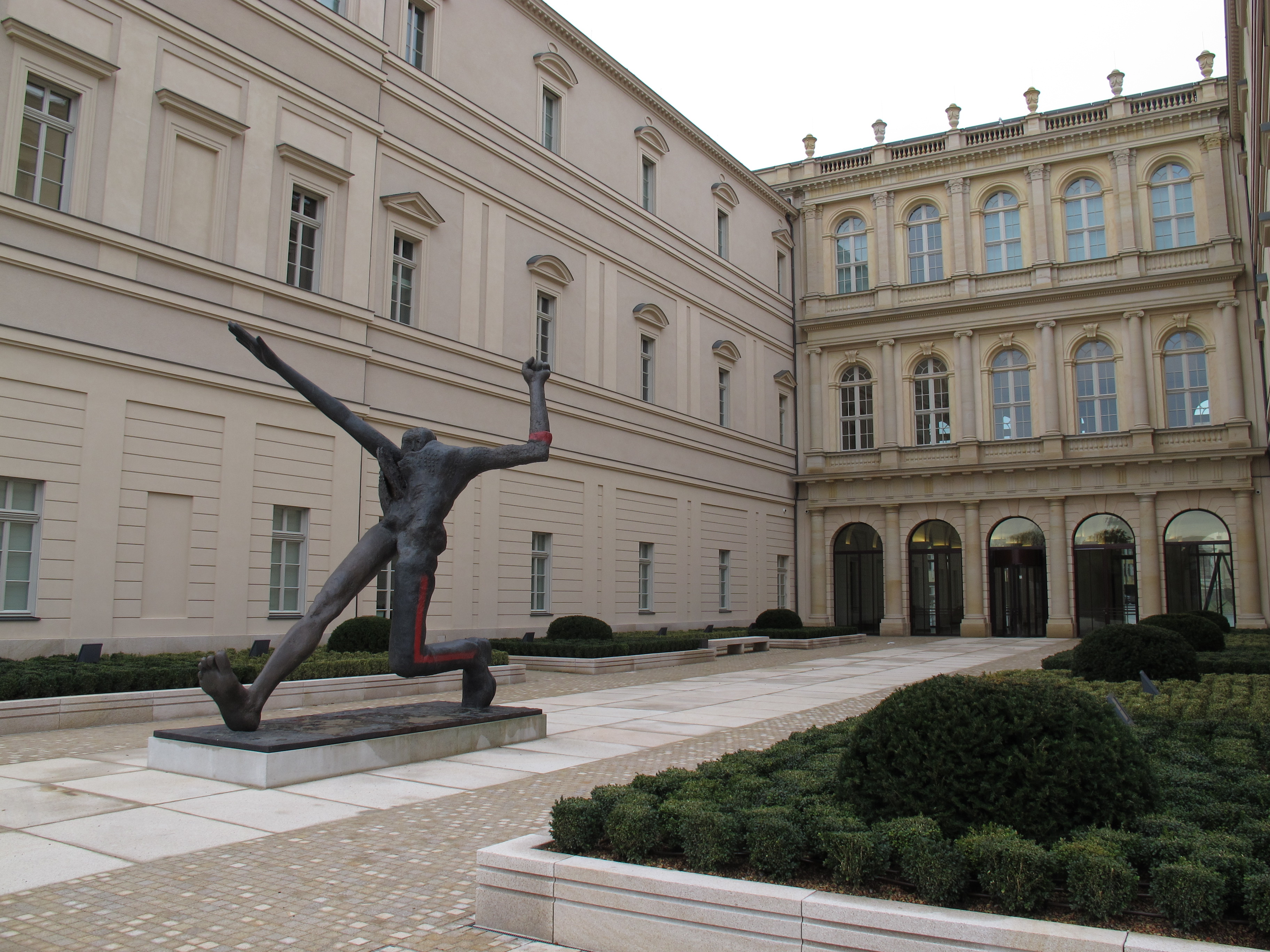
Wolfgang Mattheuer's sculpture Der Jahrhundertschritt (1984, bronze), in the courtyard

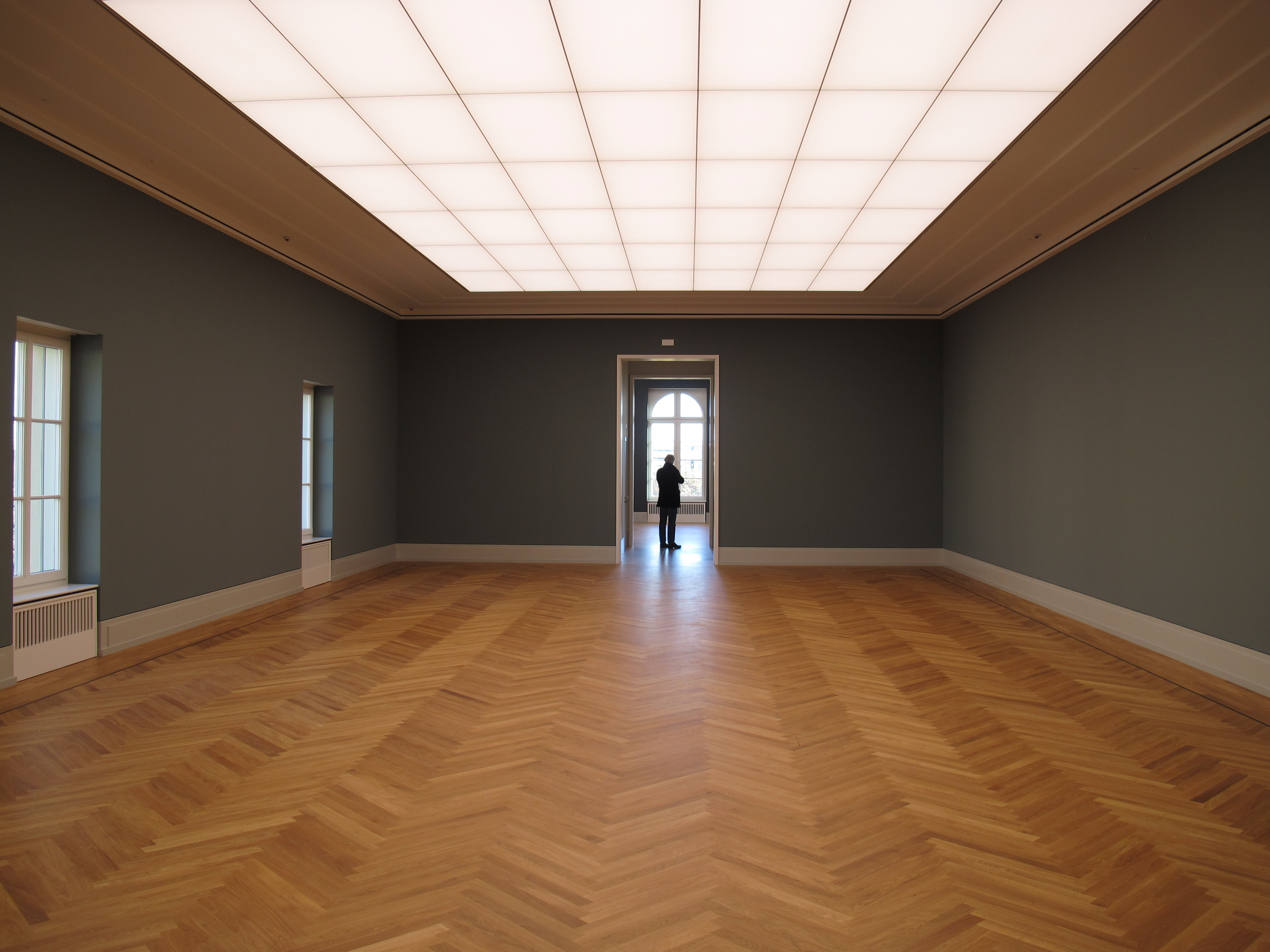
Interior before the opening
