= Palazzo Barberini =

Palace in Rome now an art museum

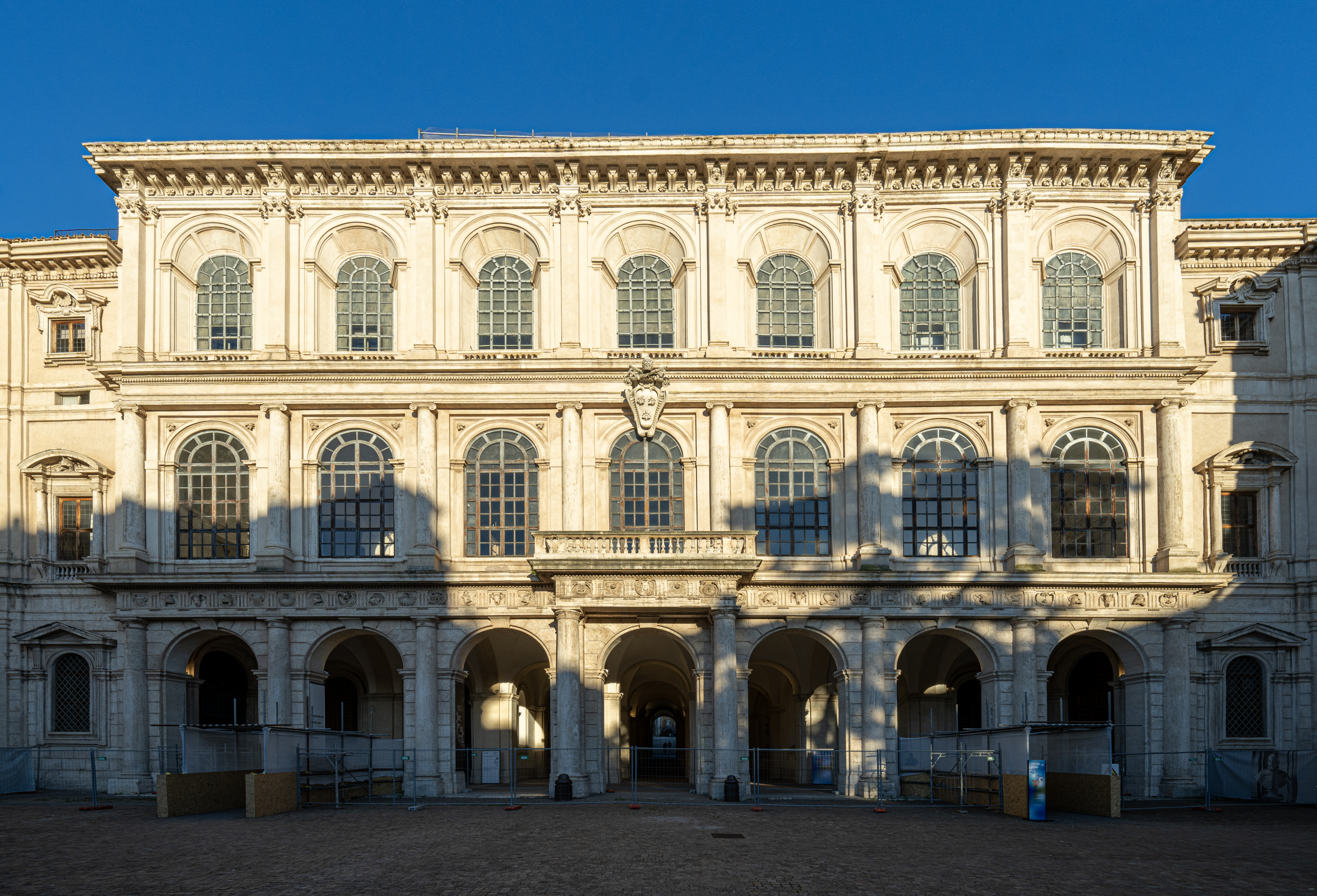
- Palazzo Barberini entrance and façade
- Click on the map for a fullscreen view

General information
- Architectural style: Baroque
- Location: Rome, Italy
- Coordinates: 41°54′13″N 12°29′25″E
- Construction started: 1625
- Completed: 1633

Design and construction
- Architects: Gian Lorenzo Bernini; Carlo Maderno; Francesco Borromini

Website
- http://www.barberinicorsini.org/

The Palazzo Barberini (English: Barberini Palace) is a 17th-century palace in Rome, facing the Piazza Barberini in Rione Trevi. Today, it houses the Galleria Nazionale d'Arte Antica, the main national collection of older paintings in Rome.

== History ==
Around 1549 Cardinal Alessandro Sforza came into possession of the garden/vineyard of Cardinal Rodolfo Pio da Carpi on the Quirinal Hill, where the Sforza family had a palazzetto built. The sloping, semi-urban site was purchased in 1625 from Alessandro Sforza, Duca di Segni, by Maffeo Barberini, of the Barberini family, who became Pope Urban VIII.

Three great architects worked to create the Palazzo, each contributing his own style and character to the building. Carlo Maderno, then at work extending the nave of St Peter's, was commissioned to enclose the Villa Sforza within a vast Renaissance block along the lines of Palazzo Farnese; however, the design quickly evolved into a precedent-setting combination of an urban seat of princely power combined with a garden front that had the nature of a suburban villa with a semi-enclosed garden.

Maderno began in 1627, assisted by his nephew Francesco Borromini. When Maderno died in 1629, Borromini was passed over and the commission to oversee construction was awarded to Bernini, a young prodigy then better known as a sculptor. Borromini stayed on regardless and the two architects worked together, albeit briefly, on this project and at the Palazzo Spada. Works were completed by Bernini in 1633.

The palace was inhabited mainly by Pope Urban VIII’s two nephews Francesco and Taddeo, with Taddeo and his family living in one wing and Francesco in the other. Francesco established there the Arazzia Barberini or Barberini Tapestry works, which operated from 1627 until 1679.

In February 1634, a revised version of Il Sant'Alessio was performed at the Teatro delle Quattro Fontane, the Cardinal's private opera theater in the Palazzo. The Cardinal had written the libretto and Stefano Landi the music. Cardinal Francesco's other contributions to the Palazzo were a small natural science museum and botanical garden and a library which included ancient Greek and Roman manuscripts. His collections attested to his interests in ancient sculpture, numismatics and inscriptions. In 1902, the large Biblioteca Barberina was purchased by Pope Leo XIII and became part of the Vatican holdings.

After the Wars of Castro and the death of Urban VIII, the palace was confiscated by Pamphili Pope Innocent X and was only returned to the Barberini in 1653.

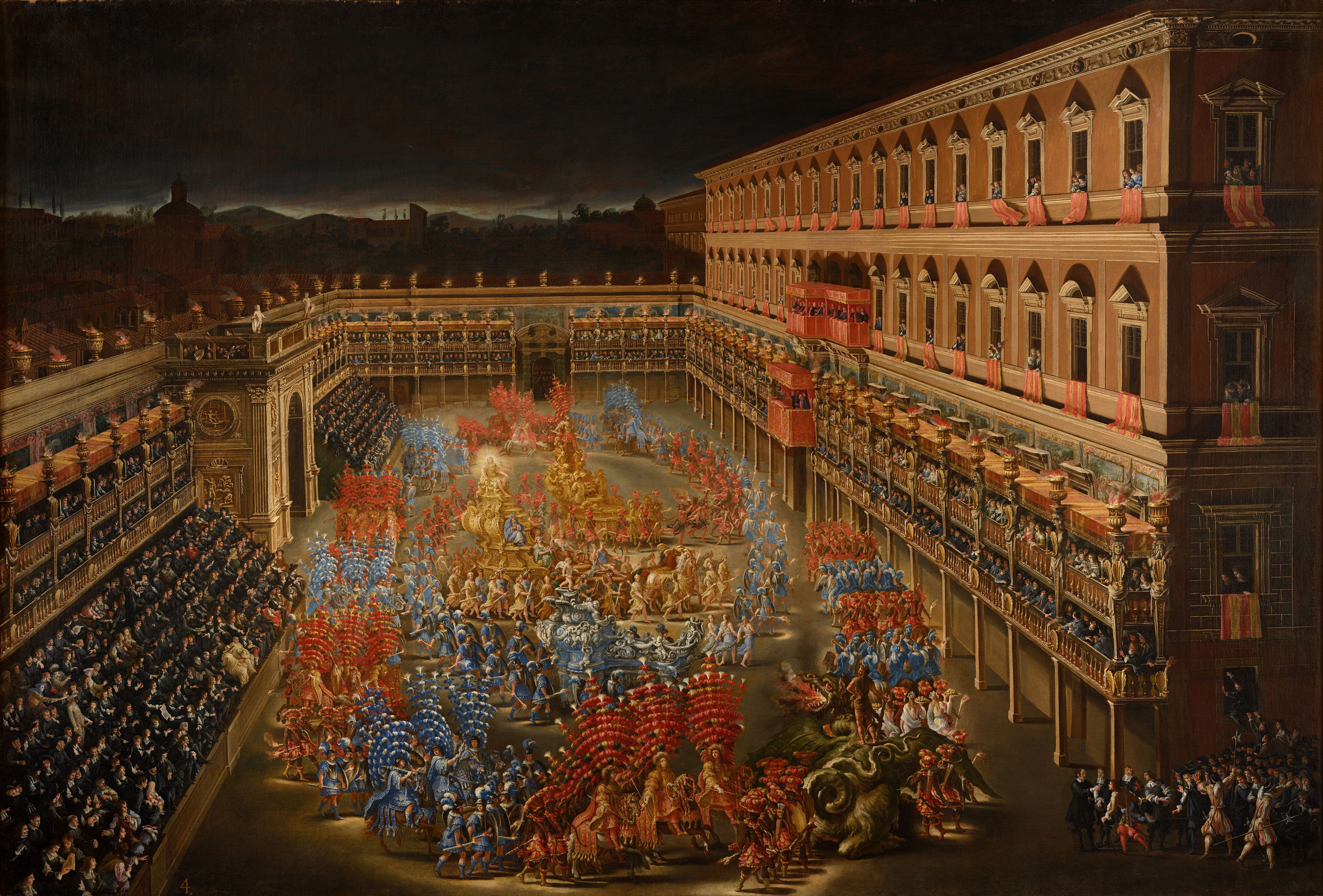
Celebrations for Christina of Sweden at Palazzo Barberini on 28 February 1656.

Christina of Sweden visited Rome in December 1655. Nobles vied for her attention and treated her to a never-ending round of fireworks, jousts, mock duels, acrobatics, and operas. She was welcomed at the Palazzo Barberini on 28 February by a few hundred privileged spectators, as she watched an amazing carousel in the courtyard.

== Architecture ==
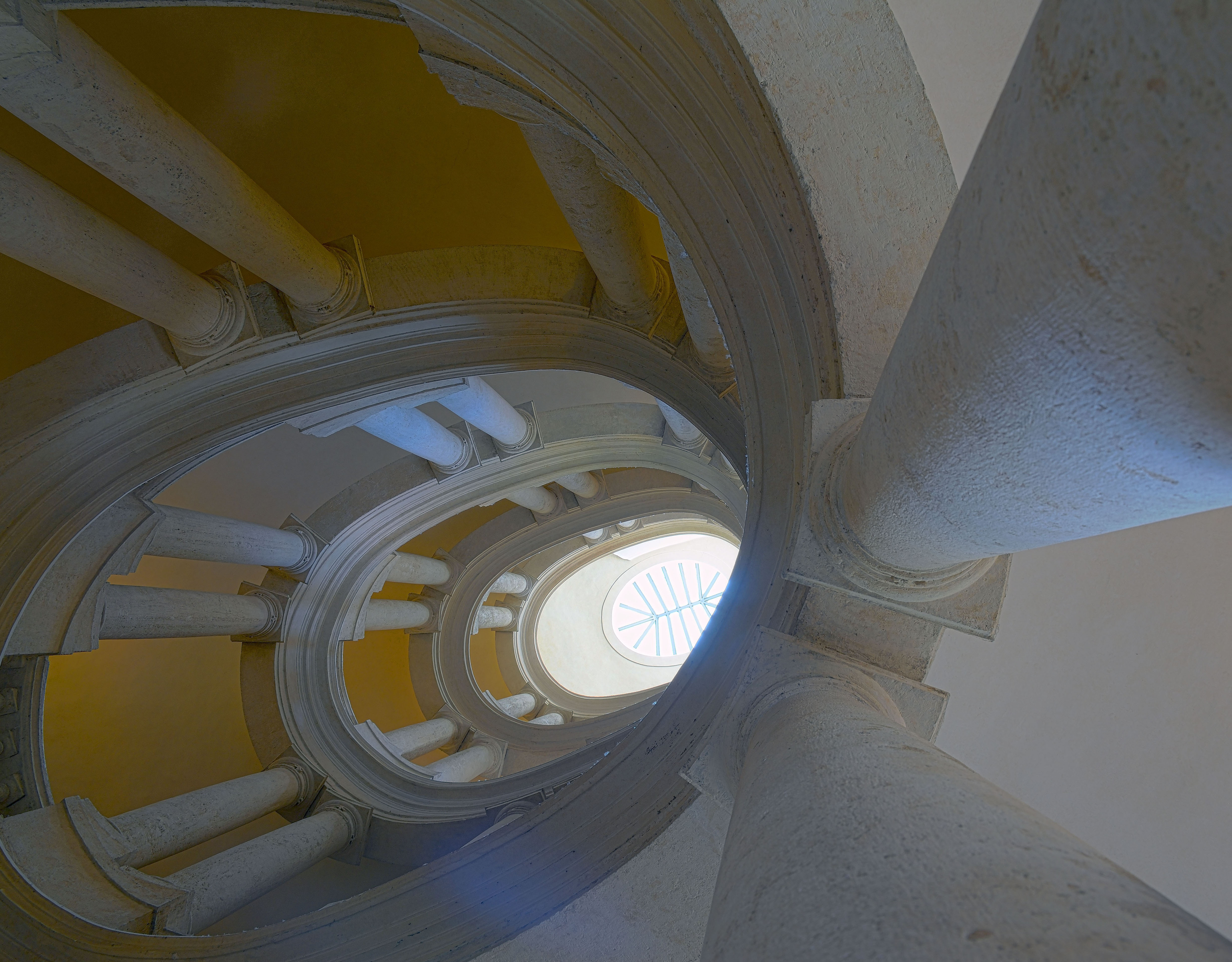
The famous helicoidal staircase by Borromini.

Maderno envisioned a floor plan in the shape of an "H", with the Sforza wing facing the piazza. A second parallel wing is connected by a central hall. Flanking the hall, two sets of stairs lead to the piano nobile, a large squared staircase by Bernini to the left and a smaller oval staircase by Borromini to the right. The main block presents three tiers of great arch-headed windows, like glazed arcades, a formula that was more Venetian than Roman. On the uppermost floor, Borromini's windows are set in a false perspective that suggests extra depth, a feature that has been copied into the 20th century. Other influential aspects of Palazzo Barberini that were repeated throughout Europe include the unit of a central two-storey hall backed by an oval salone and the symmetrical wings that extended forward from the main block to create a cour d'honneur. The Palazzo Barberini was heavily influenced by the Villa Farnesina, built by Baldasarre Peruzzi between 1509 and 1510, especially in the horseshoe-shaped layout.

The entrance opens onto Via delle Quattro Fontane through a gate designed by the architect Azzurri in 1848 and built in 1865, with the large telamons sculpted by Adamo Tadolini.

The façade is composed of seven bays that are repeated across three levels of arches supported by columns representing the three classical orders (Doric, Ionic, and Corinthian). The lower arches lead to the ground floor, entering a large elliptical atrium flanked by two staircases on the sides and featuring a central staircase leading to the gardens, located on a higher level than the ground floor.

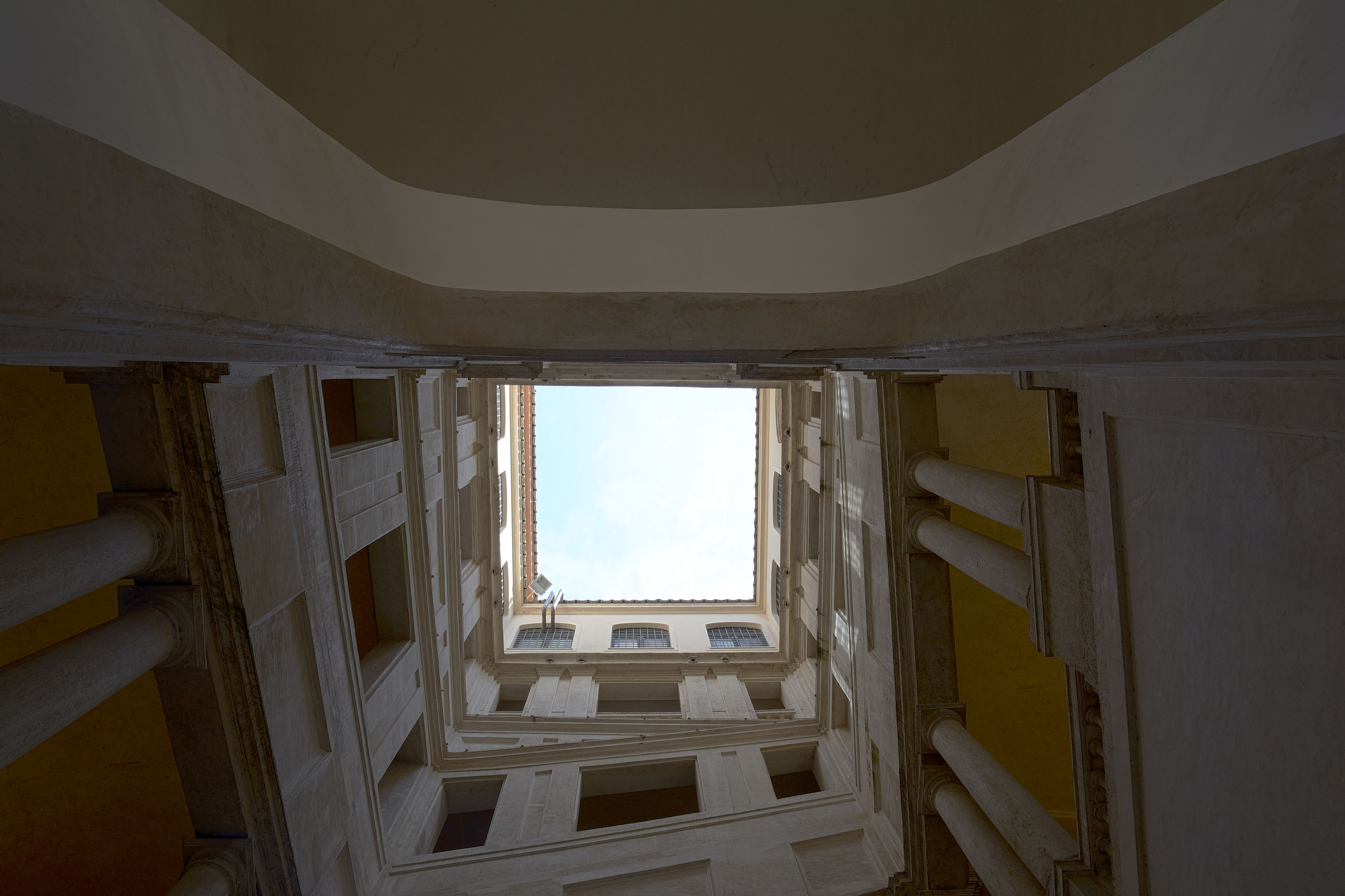
Bernini's staircase

=== The garden ===
Because the status of the Palazzo stood between that of a city palace and that of a villa, the garden was originally a true park, including the land along the Pia road (today Via XX Settembre) up to the current salita di San Nicola da Tolentino. The space was organised as an Italian garden, complete with a secret garden andpopulated by exotic animals such as ostriches and camels.

At the end of the eighteenth century, the layout of the garden was changed significantly: an area of tall trees from a romantic garden, the so-called cork house in front of the stairway connecting the garden to the palace. In 1814, in the upper corner between Via delle Quattro Fontane and Strada Pia, a sferisterio open to the public was built, which lasted until 1881, when the garden began to be nibbled away at the edges by the urban planning of the capital, first under the Umbertine and then under the Fascists.

Following the Unification of Italy, the Barberini garden, being a large open space located in the heart of the historic centre, was promptly sucked into the urban development of the new capital, which was aligning its ministries along Via XX Settembre. The garden was spared the complete subdivision that destroyed Villa Ludovisi, sacrificing the marginal strips towards Strada Pia - Palazzo Bourbon Artom, Palazzo Calabresi, Palazzo Baracchini, the building of the General Staff of Defence, and along the carriage ramp the large greenhouse was built (1875).

During the years of fascism (1938) the "family" buildings along via delle Quattro Fontane were replaced by the Palazzo dei Beni Stabili and the Savorgnan di Brazzà building (1936, Giovannoni and Piacentini) was built behind the cork house, during the foundation excavations of which a 2nd century Mithraeum was found.

The garden is known as a giardino segreto ("secret garden"), for its concealment from an outsider's view. It houses a monument to Bertel Thorwaldsen, who had a studio in the nearby stables of the Palazzo Barberini in 1822–1834.

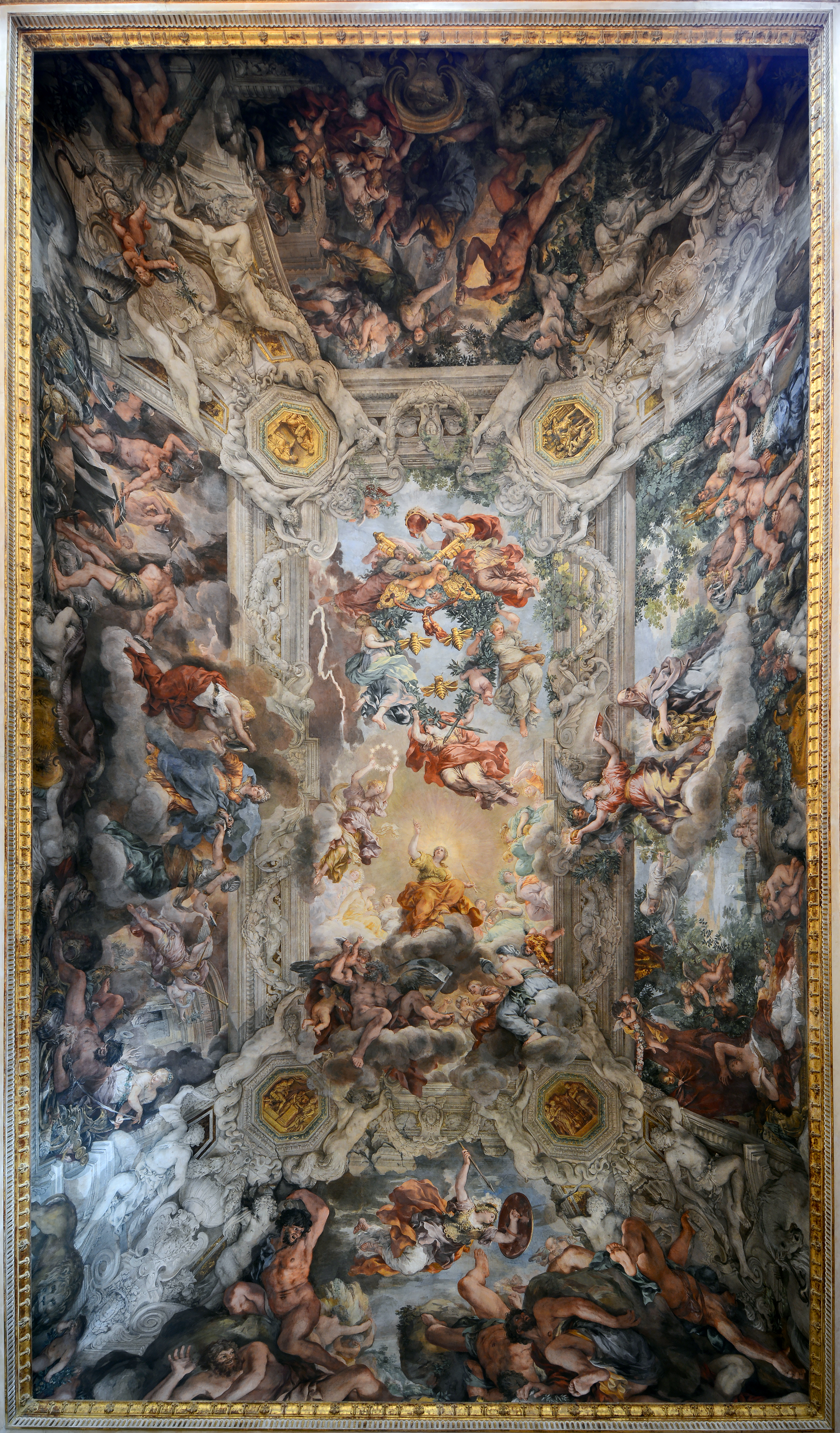
The famous ceiling by Pietro Cortona, Allegory of Divine Providence and Barberini Power, 1639

== Frescoes ==
On the salon ceiling is a Baroque fresco by Pietro da Cortona, Allegory of Divine Providence and Barberini Power. This vast panegyric allegory became highly influential in guiding decoration for palatial and church ceilings; its influence can be seen in other panoramic scenes such as the frescoed ceilings at Sant'Ignazio (by Pozzo); or those at Villa Pisani at Stra, the throne room of the Royal Palace of Madrid, and the Ca' Rezzonico in Venice (by Tiepolo). Also in the palace is Divine Wisdom by Andrea Sacchi, a contemporary critic of the Cortona style.

The rooms of the piano nobile have frescoed ceilings by other seventeenth-century artists like Giuseppe Passeri and Andrea Camassei. In the museum collection are precious detached frescoes by Polidoro da Caravaggio and his lover Maturino da Firenze.

== Modern history and attractions ==
Around the mid 18th-century a Rococo-style apartment was decorated on the top floor. Descendants of the Barberini family lived in the 1700-style apartment in the palazzo until 1955.

During the construction of Villa Savorgnan di Brazzà in 1936, a Mithraeum, probably dating from the second century AD, was found hidden in the cellars of the rear part of the Palazzo.

The European Convention on Human Rights (ECHR), which created the European Court of Human Rights, was signed in the Palazzo on 4 November 1950, a milestone in the protection of human rights.

Today, Palazzo Barberini houses the Galleria Nazionale d'Arte Antica, one of the most important painting collections in Italy. It includes Raphael's portrait La fornarina, Caravaggio's Judith Beheading Holofernes, and a Hans Holbein portrait of Henry VIII. The Palazzo also houses sculptures, including Antonio Corradini's work Vestal Virgin Tuccia, and the Italian Institute of Numismatics.

== See also ==
- Piazza Barberini
- Palast Barberini
- Barberini family

== Sources ==
- Blunt, Anthony (1958). "The Palazzo Barberini: The Contributions of Maderno, Bernini and Pietro da Cortona". Journal of the Warburg and Courtauld Institutes. 21 (3/4): 256–287. doi:10.2307/750826. JSTOR 750826.

Preceded by Palazzo Aragona Gonzaga	Landmarks of Rome; Palazzo Barberini	Succeeded by Palazzo Borghese
