= Court of honor (architecture) =

Architectural term for a three-sided courtyard

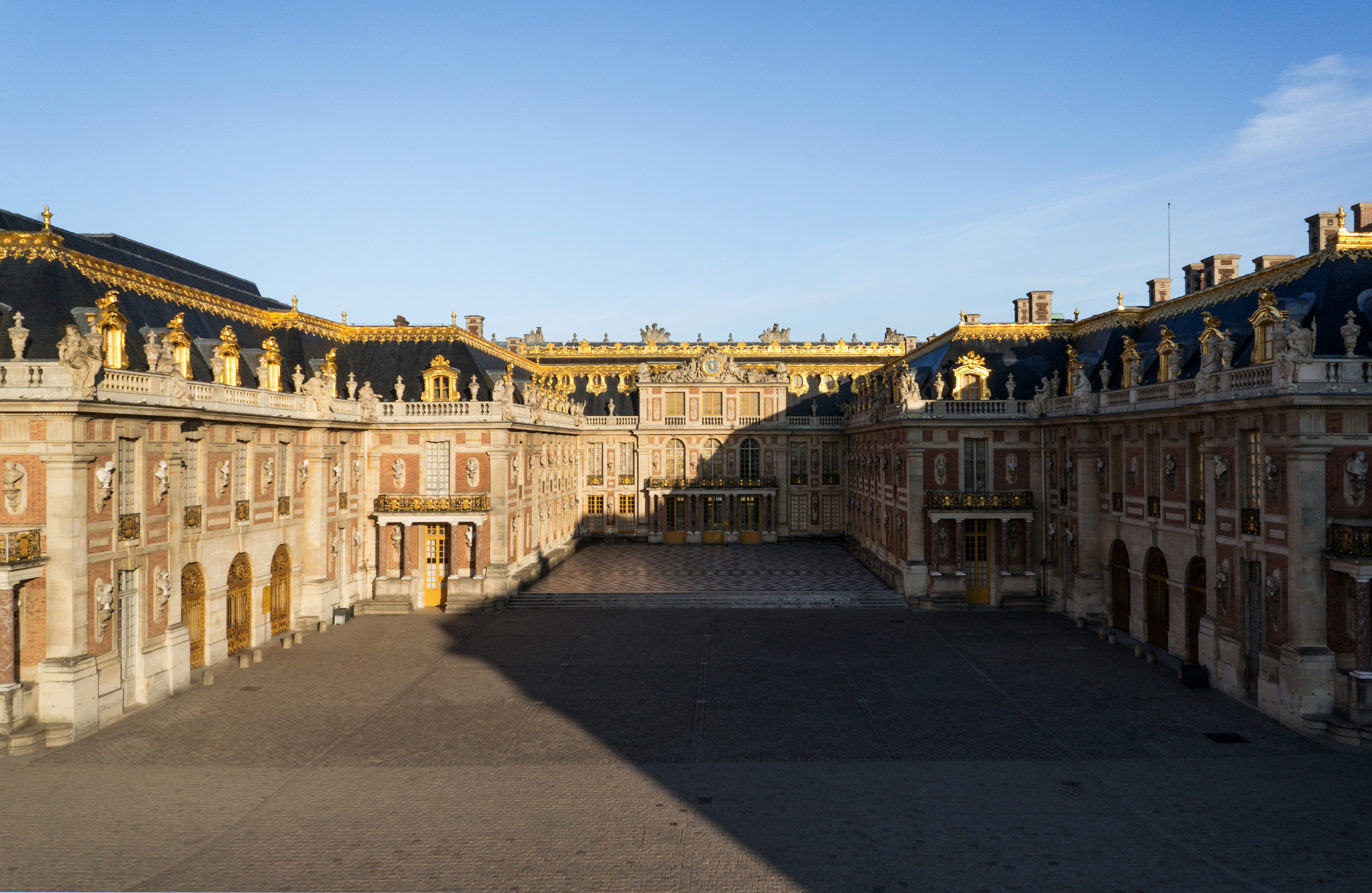
Louis Le Vau opened up the interior court of the Château de Versailles to create the expansive entrance cour d'honneur, subsequently copied all over Europe.

A court of honor (French: cour d'honneur [kuʁ dɔnœʁ]; German: Ehrenhof [ˈeːʁənhoːf]) is the principal and formal approach and forecourt of a large building. It is usually defined by two secondary wings projecting forward from the main central block (corps de logis), sometimes with a fourth side, consisting of a low wing or a railing. The Palace of Versailles (illustration) and Blenheim Palace (plan) both feature such entrance courts.

== Definition ==
Blenheim Palace: "F" marks the corps de logis containing the principal rooms. "A" marks the cour d'honneur, while "B" and "C" are the secondary service wings.

Technically, the term cour d'honneur can be used of any large building whether public or residential, ancient or modern, which has a symmetrical courtyard laid out in this way.

== History ==
Some 16th-century symmetrical Western European country houses built on U-shaped groundplans resulted in a sheltered central door in a main range that was embraced between projecting wings, but the formalized cour d'honneur is first found in the great palaces and mansions of 17th-century Europe, where it forms the principal approach and ceremonial entrance to the building. Its open courtyard is presented like the classical permanent theatre set of a proscenium stage, such as the built Roman set of opposed palazzi in a perspective street at Palladio's Teatro Olimpico (Vicenza, 1584). Like the theatre set, the built environment is defined and enclosed from the more public space by ornate wrought iron gilded railings. A later development replaced the railings with an open architectural columnar screen, as at Palais Royal (Paris), Schönbrunn Palace (Vienna), Alexander Palace (Saint Petersburg), or Henry Holland's Ionic screen formerly at Carlton House, London (illustrated below).

Examples of a cour d'honneur can be found in many of the most notable Baroque and classicizing buildings of Europe including the Palazzo Pitti, one of the first 16th century residences to open a cour d'honneur in the Pitti's case by embracing three sides of an existing public space. Other 16th century urban palazzi remained resolutely enclosed, like Palazzo Farnese, Rome. In Rome, the wings of Carlo Maderno's Palazzo Barberini design (1627), were the first that reached forward from a central block to create a cour d'honneur floorplan.

On a condensed, urban scale the formula is expressed in Parisian private houses, hôtels particuliers built entre cour et jardin (pronounced [ɑ̃tʁ(ə) kuʁ e ʒaʁdɛ̃]), between courtyard and garden, as can be seen at the Hôtel de Besenval. In these plans, the street front may be expressed as a range of buildings not unlike the ordinary houses (maisons) that flank it, but with a grand, often arched, doorway, through which a carriage could pass into the cour d'honneur secreted behind. In a cramped site, one of the flanking walls of the cour d'honneur may be no more than an architectural screen, balancing the wing of the hôtel opposite it, which would often contain domestic offices and a stable. On a grander scale, the Palais Royal was laid out in just this manner, among the first Paris hôtels particuliers to have a cour d'honneur, which once was separated from the public street by a wrought iron grille, later by an open architectural screen, with its grand open jardin behind, now a public space. Nearby, the Tuileries Palace is gone: but the cour d'honneur with its Arc du Carrousel remains, as do the Tuileries Gardens behind the former palace's site.

In densely built cities disposed on a rigorously democratic grid plan such as New York, private houses with a cour d'honneur were rare, even in the Gilded Age; the Villard Houses on Madison Avenue and the former William K. Vanderbilt House on the Plaza were the rare exceptions. In London, Burlington House retains its cour d'honneur, whereas Buckingham Palace's is no longer extant, as it was remodeled to be enclosed on all four sides, thus becoming (and now known as) a quadrangle.

== Gallery ==
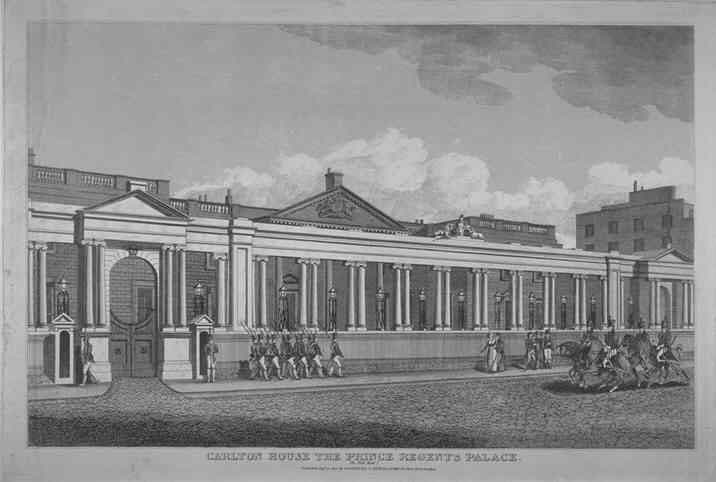
Henry Holland's Ionic screen fronts a shallow cour d'honneur at the Prince Regent's Carlton House in Pall Mall, London

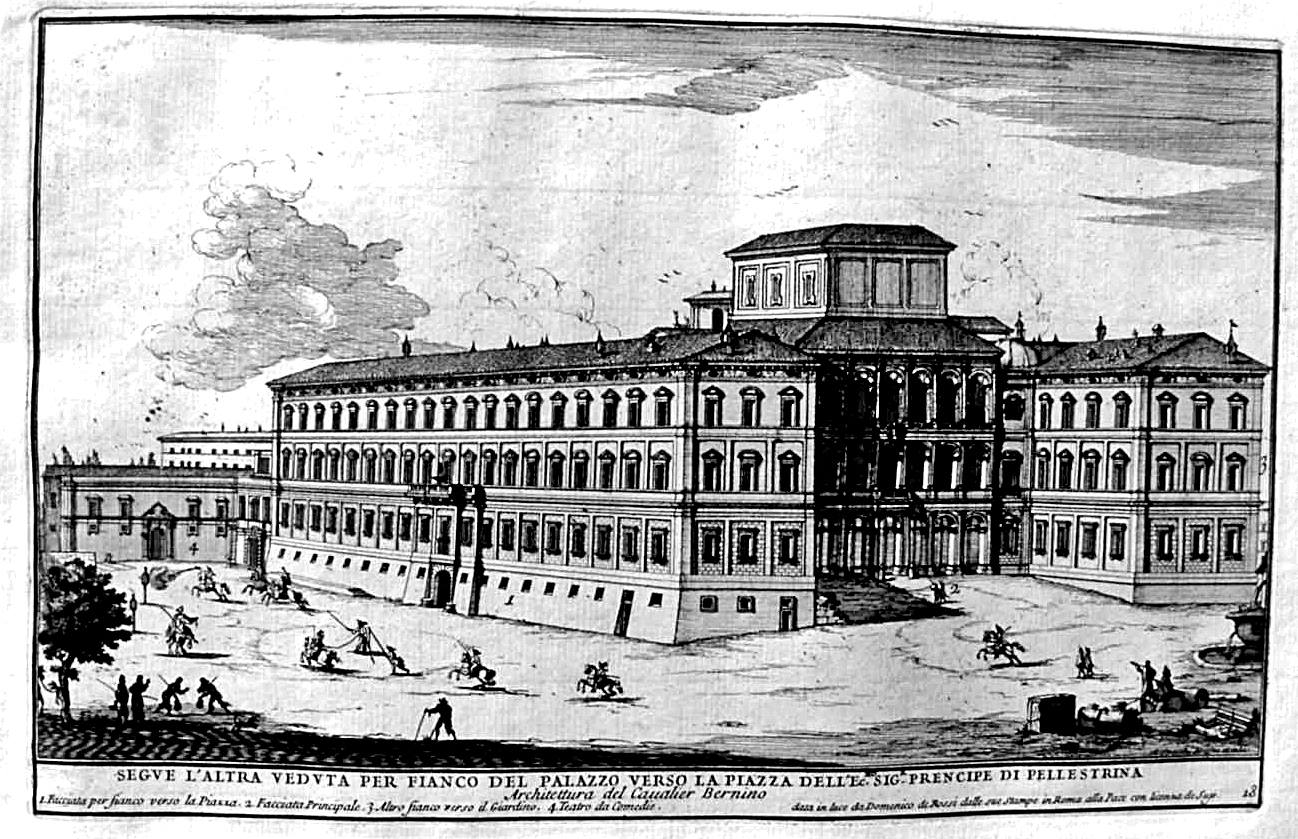
Palazzo Barberini: without railings the entrance court is still public space

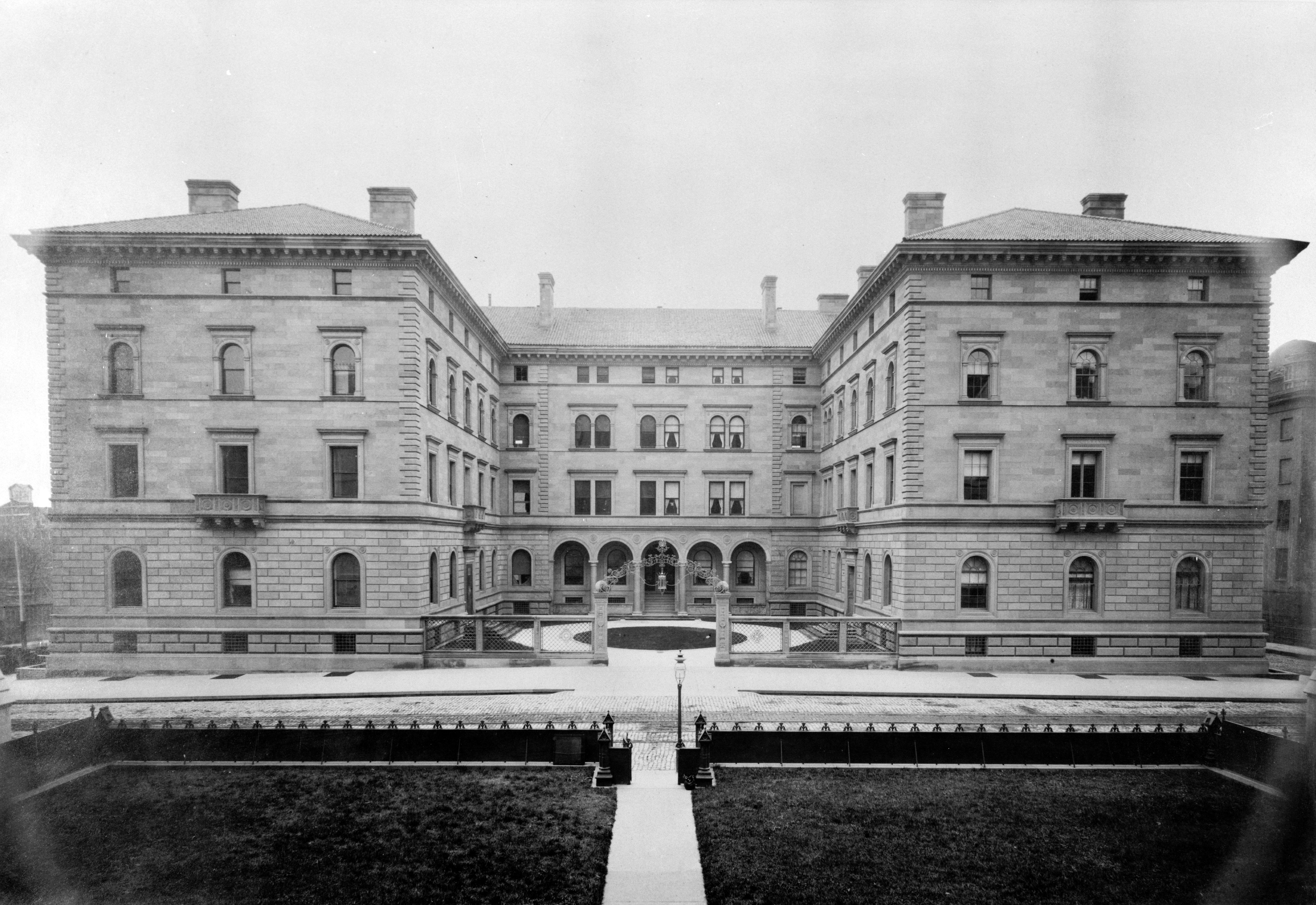
The Villard Houses facing Madison Avenue, New York

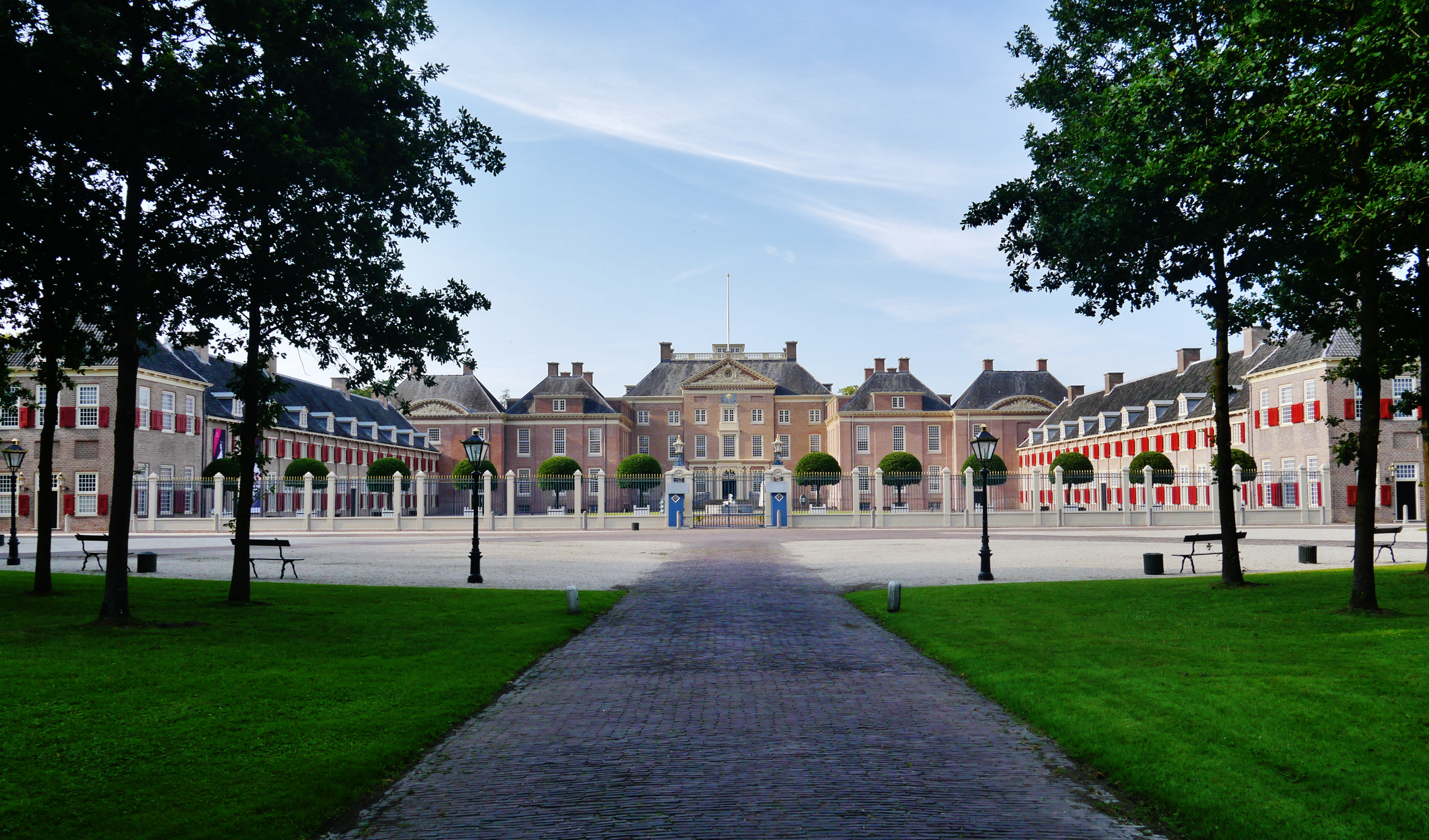
Het Loo Palace Apeldoorn, the Netherlands

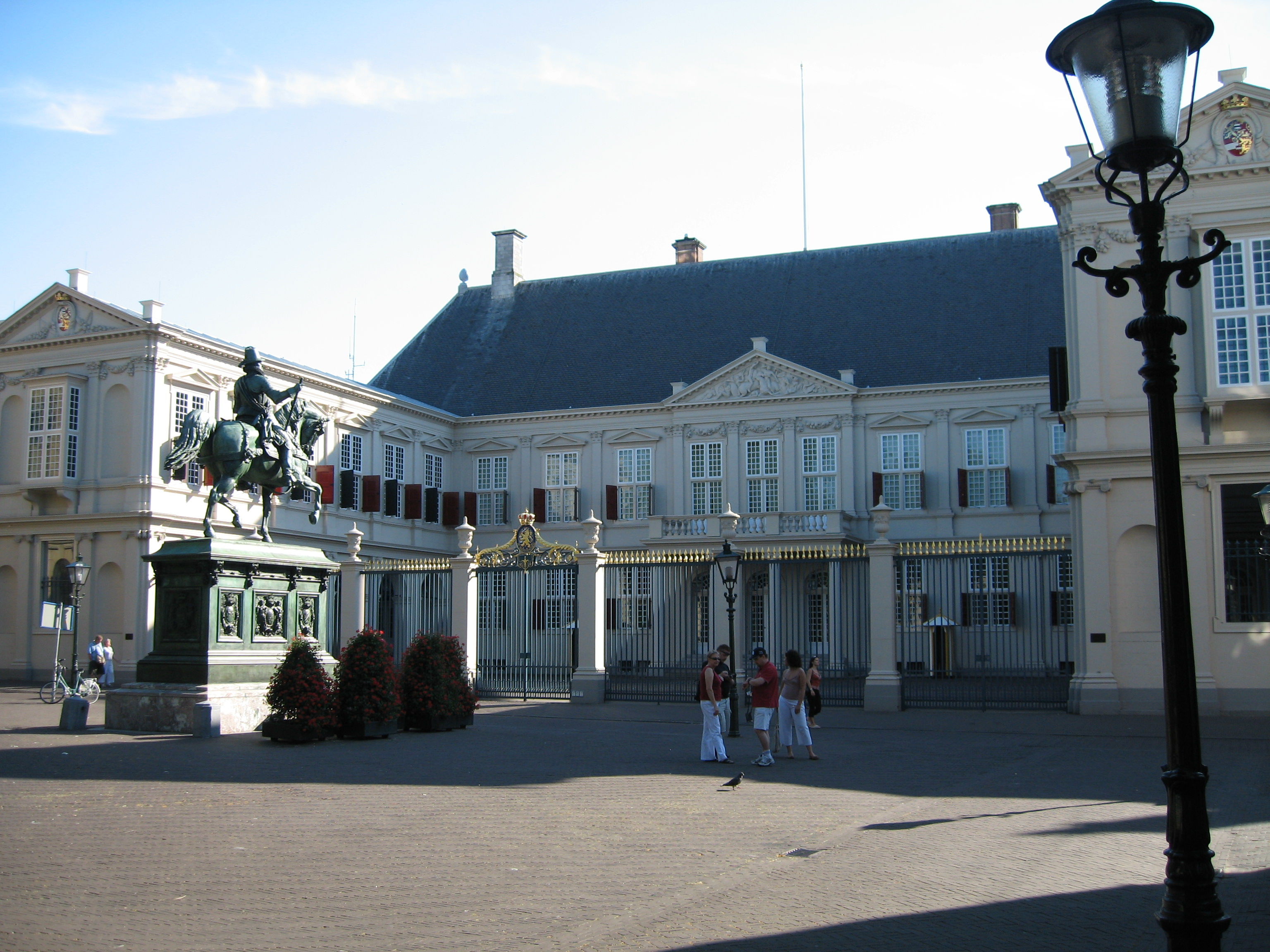
Noordeinde Palace The Hague, the Netherlands

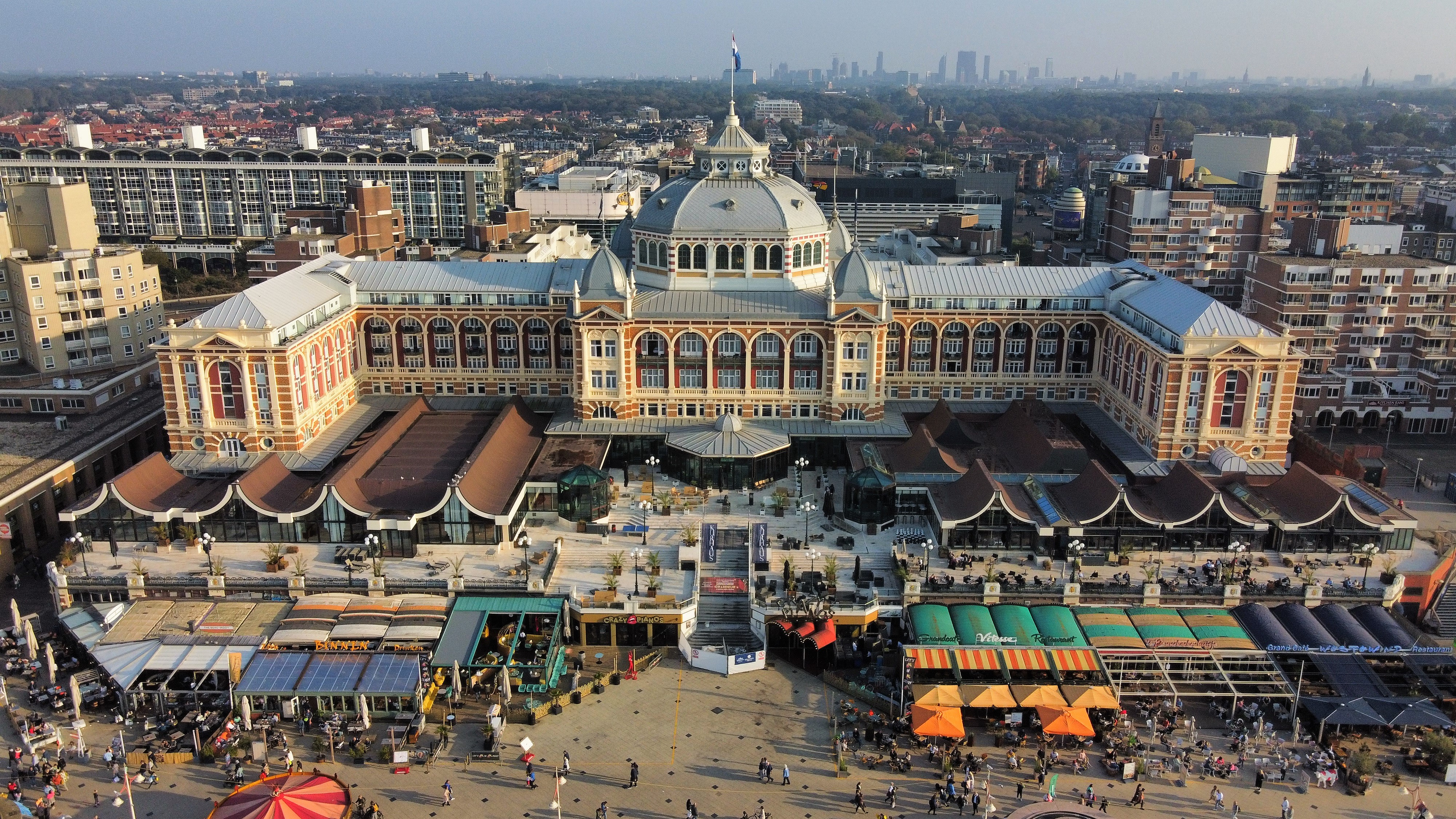
Kurhaus of Scheveningen The Hague, the Netherlands
