= Gonfalone of the Church =

Gonfalone of Boniface VIII

The Banner of the Holy Roman Church (Latin: Vexillum; Italian: Gonfalone di Santa Romana Chiesa, occasionally Vessilio di San Pietro, "Standard of Saint Peter") was the battle standard of the Papal States during the Renaissance and a symbol of the Catholic Church. The office of the Gonfalonier of the Church was originally intended to function as its bearer of the Holy See.

== Description ==
Gonfalone with St. Peter and St. Paul

Gonfalone of Innocent III

The insignia was made of red cloth decorated, initially, with the image of St. Peter and occasionally later with St. Paul as well. Pope Innocent III (1198–1216) replaced these with the emblem of crossed keys surmounted by a white cross. Pope Boniface VIII (1294–1303) established the final form: a cloth of crimson silk, covered with numerous six-pointed stars embroidered in gold, bearing the image of the crossed keys surmounted by a umbraculum, or veil bearing a gold tassel at either end. The banner was attached to a long golden rod and followed the pope in his travels, including solemn religious and civil processions, such as the feast of Corpus Christi.

== History ==
The Vexillum of Saint Peter came into use under Pope Alexander II during a critical period in the Investiture Controversy. Though the Holy Roman Emperor refused to recognise papal authority at the time, Alexander sought to strengthen his image via symbolic acts, such as granting the banner of St. Peter and a blessing to kings who in return offered themselves as his vassals, such as William the Conqueror before the Norman invasion. The banner was used for the highest-level investiture ceremonies, implying the Papacy's authority over temporal lords. Such banners were also present in the Crusades and at the battle of Lepanto.

Custody of the Vexillum of the Holy Roman Church was entrusted to a high-ranking figure, who assumed the title of Gonfaloniere or Vessillifero di Santa Romana Chiesa (Gonfalonier of the Holy Roman Church). It was the highest role the pope could grant to a layman, as demonstrated by several of its holders having been kings. Kingly holders included James II of Aragon (1267-1327, king of Sardinia and Corsica, from Pope Boniface VIII) and Ladislaus of Naples (1376–1414, king of Naples, Sicily and Hungary, by Pope Innocent VII). It was also granted to

- Louis XI of France whilst Dauphin (by Pope Eugenius IV)
- Gianfrancesco Gonzaga marquess of Mantua (by Pope Julius II)
- Odoardo I Farnese, fifth duke of Parma and Piacenza, from Pope Gregory XV (1621–1623)
- Carlo Barberini by his brother Pope Urban VIII (1623–1644)
- Torquato Conti, duke of Guadagnolo, by Urban VIII after Carlo's death in 1630

Pope Innocent XI (1676–1689) made the post hereditary and conferred it on marquess Giovanni Battista Naro. When the Naro family died out, it then passed to the patrician Montoros. To confirm the office's importance Pope Clement XI (1700–1721) ordered that its holder had to be escorted, in solemn procession, by the captains of the Cavalleggeri (Papal light cavalry). In 1801, Pope Pius VII, after the Cavalleggeri were dissolved, replaced them by instituting a new body, the Noble Pontifical Guard, with the standard-bearer acting as its captain with the rank of Tenente Generale. Finally, Pope Pius IX ordered that the office-holder was to be accorded a distinctive special collar showing the word Vexillifer and that the holder was always a member of the Papal court.

== See also ==
- Gonfaloniere
- Captain General of the Church
- Umbraculum
