= Cardinals created by Alexander VIII =

Catholic appointments from 1689 to 1690

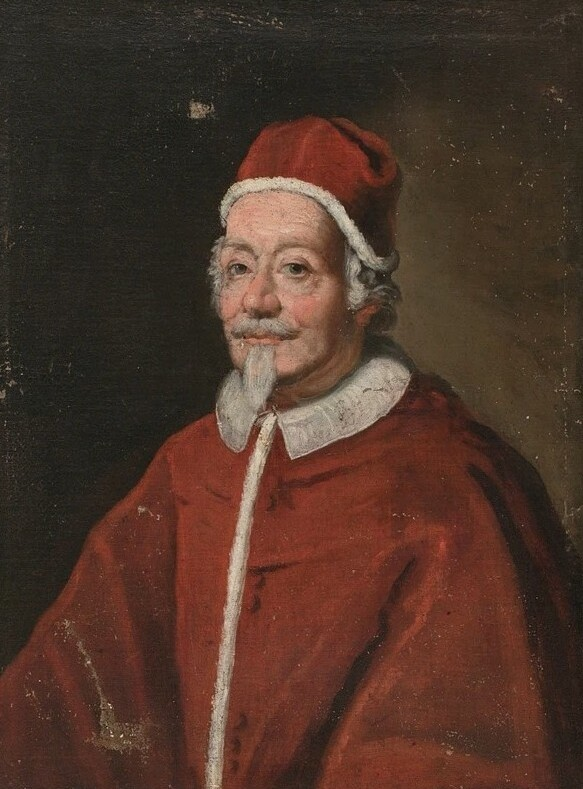
Pope Alexander VIII (1610–91)

Pope Alexander VIII (r. 1689–1691) created 14 cardinals in three consistories.

== 7 November 1689 ==
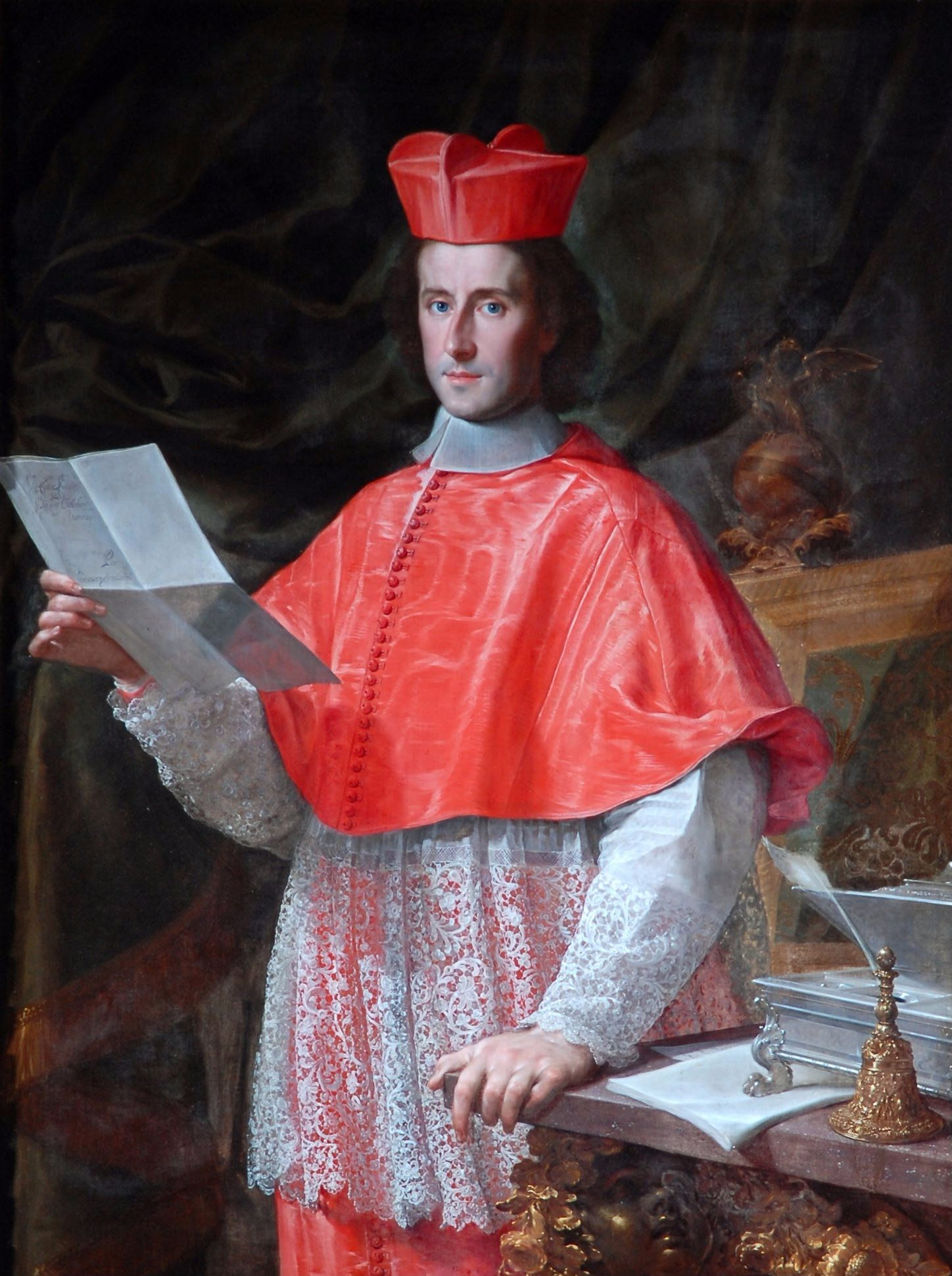
Pietro Ottoboni (1667–1740), made a cardinal on November 7, 1689.

1. Pietro Ottoboni

== 13 February 1690 ==
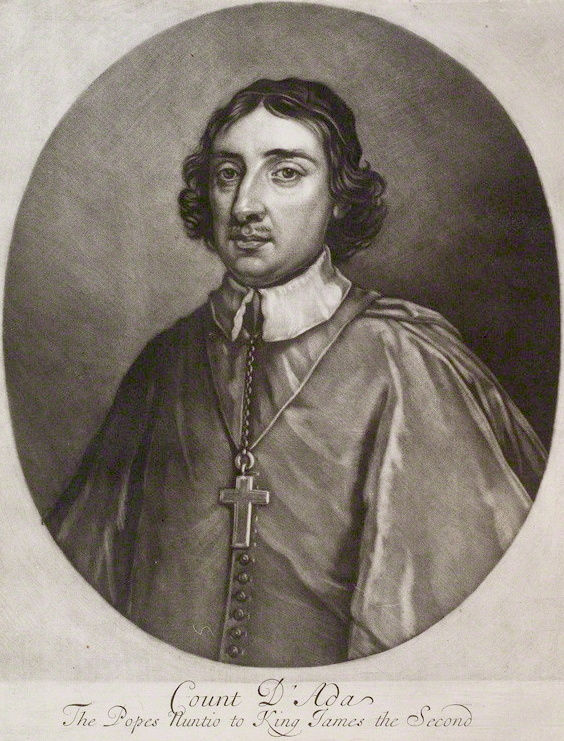
Ferdinando d'Adda (1650–1719), made a cardinal on February 13, 1690.

1. Bandino Panciatici
2. Giacomo Cantelmo
3. Ferdinando d'Adda
4. Toussaint de Forbin-Janson
5. Giambattista Rubini
6. Francesco del Giudice
7. Giambattista Costaguti
8. Carlo Bichi
9. Giuseppe Renato Imperiali
10. Luigi Omodei
11. Giovanni Francesco Albani, became Pope Clement XI in 1700

== 13 November 1690 ==
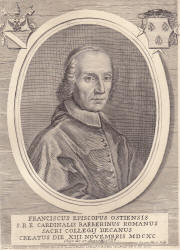
Francesco Barberini (1662–1738), made a cardinal on November 13, 1690.

1. Francesco Barberini
2. Lorenzo Altieri
