= Gonfalonier of the Church =

Military and political office of the Papal States

The Gonfalonier of the Church or Papal Gonfalonier (Italian: Gonfaloniere della Chiesa, "standard-bearer"; Latin: Vexillifer Ecclesiæ) was a military and political office of the Papal States. Originating from the use of the Papal banner during combat, the office later became largely ceremonial and political. At his nomination, the gonfalonier was given two banners, one with the arms of the Church (vexillum cum armis Ecclesiæ) and another with the arms of the reigning pope (cum armis suis). The gonfalonier was entitled to include ecclesiastical emblems (the Keys of St. Peter and the ombrellino) upon his own arms, usually only during his term of office but on occasion permanently. Pope Innocent XII ended the rank, along with the captaincy general, and replaced them both with the position of flag-bearer of the Holy Roman Church (Italian: Vessilifero di Santa Romana Chiesa), which later became hereditary in the Naro Patrizi.

== List of gonfaloniers of the Church ==
The Gonzaga family arms, displaying the papal insignia acquired by Federico II as Papal Gonfalonier

The Montefeltro family arms, displaying the papal insignia acquired by Federico III as Papal Gonfalonier

| Term of office | Portrait | Gonfalonier | Appointing Pope | Notes |
|---|---|---|---|---|
| 1059–1063 | | Robert Guiscard | Nicholas II (1059–1061) | |
| 1063–1075 | | Saint Erlembald | Alexander II (1061–1073) | |
| c. 1118 | | Stephen the Norman | | With Pier Leoni, rescued Pope Gelasius II from Cencio II Frangipane. |
| c. 1296 | | James II of Aragon | Boniface VIII (1294–1303) | King of Aragon and Valencia; Gonfalonier, admiral, and Captain General of the Church; appointed to encourage him to wage war against his brother Frederick III (cf. Sicilian Vespers) |
| 1372–? | | Galeotto I Malatesta | Gregory XI (1370–1378) | Commander of the Papal Army against Bernabò Visconti, whom he defeated at Montechiaro. |
| 1377–1384 | | Ridolfo II da Varano di Camerino | Gregory XI (1370–1378) | Appointed by Gregory XI and served as Commander of the Papal Army during the final years of the Avignon Papacy. |
| 1384–1385 | | Charles III of Naples | Urban VI (1378–1389) | King of Naples. Excommunicated and removed from office, his forces besieged the pope at Nocera, while the pope later attempted to usurp Naples for his nephew. |
| 1387–? | | Carlo I Malatesta | Urban VI (1378–1389) | A condottiero. |
| c. 1399 | | Martin of Aragon | Antipope; Benedict XIII | King of Aragon and Sicily. Gonfalonier of the Western antipope, but refused to wage war against France during the siege of Avignon |
| 1403–? | | Niccolò III d'Este | Boniface IX (1389–1404) | A condottiero; also Lord of Ferrara. Appointed in opposition to Milan. Possibly reappointed by Pope Martin V. |
| 1406–? | | Ladislaus of Naples | Innocent VII (1404–1406) | King of Naples; appointed for his assistance in helping Innocent VII against the Roman mob. Routed at Roccasecca in 1411, he abandoned Pope Gregory XII in favor of the antipope John XXIII, who appointed him his gonfalonier. |
| 1409–1411 | | Louis II of Naples | Antipope; Alexander V | Opposed to Ladislaus for the Kingdom of Naples, was appointed gonfalonier by the Pisan faction's antipope Alexander V. Despite winning a major victory at Roccasecca, though, abandoned the field and returned to France. |
| 1412–? | | Gianfrancesco I Gonzaga | Gregory XII (1406–1415) | A condottiero; also Lord of Mantua. |
| 1431–? | | Niccolò Fortebraccio | Eugene IV (1431–1447) | A condottiero; despite his failure to recapture Città di Castello, was hired as Gonfalonier to oppose Sigismund of Hungary in Tuscany and the Prefetti di Vico in Lazio, but fired for using his position to advance his own interests. Thereafter went to war against the Papal States for Milan. |
| 1433–1434 | | Giovanni Vitelleschi | Eugene IV (1431–1447) | Commander of the Papal Armies for a short time under Pope Eugene IV. |
| 1434–1442 | | Francesco I Sforza | Eugene IV (1431–1447) | A condottiero; while working for Milan, received the position of Gonfalonier along with Ancona as part of the terms of a peace with Eugene, then led the campaign against former Gonfalonier and his former ally Niccolò Fortebraccio. Lost his position after Milan allied with the Papacy against him. |
| 1442–? | | Niccolò Piccinino | Eugene IV (1431–1447) | A condottiero. Originally helped Fortebraccio and Sforza against the Papacy, appointed Gonfalonier to recover Sforza's holdings in the Marche. |
| 1444–? | | Louis, Dauphin of France | Eugene IV (1431–1447) | Appointed for his actions in Switzerland against the Council of Basel and the antipope Felix V. |
| c. 1455 | | Francesco I Sforza | | Second term. Now uninvested duke of Milan. |
| 1456–1458 | | Pedro Luis Borgia | Callixtus III (1455–1458) | Also Captain General. Rodrigo Borgia's older brother. |
| 1462–1468 | | Federico da Montefeltro | Pius II (1458–1464) | A condottiero; also Conte di Urbino. Appointed against Sigismondo Malatesta, lord of Rimini. Originally reappointed by Pope Paul II to oppose Venice, but challenged in his acquisition of Rimini following the victory at Molinella, switched sides. |
| 1474–1482 | | Federico da Montefeltro | Sixtus IV (1471–1484) | Second term. Now styled Duke of Urbino; married his daughter to Pope Sixtus's favorite nephew, who inherited the duchy following the death of Federico's own son. |
| 1484–1489 | | Giovanni della Rovere | Pope Innocent VIII (1484–1492) | Also Captain General. |
| 1489–1496 | | Niccolo Orsini | Pope Innocent VIII (1484–1492) | Also Captain General. |
| 1496–1497 | | Giovanni Borgia | Alexander VI (1492–1503) | Son; Duke of Gandia and also Captain General; assassinated by unknown agents. |
| 29 March 1500–1503 | | Cesare Borgia | Alexander VI (1492–1503) | Son; former cardinal, Duke of Valentinois and also Captain General. |
| 1504–1508? | | Guidobaldo da Montefeltro | Julius II (1503–1513) | A condottiero; also Duke of Urbino. Son of Federico da Montefeltro; adopted Francesco Maria I della Rovere, his nephew and the pope's. |
| 19 April 1509 – 1510 | | Alfonso I d'Este | Julius II (1503–1513) | Also Duke of Ferrara and Captain General. Commanded forces against Venice during the second phase of the War of the League of Cambrai. Removed from his post and excommunicated with all his family in order to return Ferrara to direct Papal administration. |
| 1510–? | | Francesco Gonzaga | Julius II (1503–1513) | Also Duke of Mantua and Captain General. |
| 1513–1516 | | Giuliano de'Medici | Leo X (1513–1521) | Also Captain General and Duke of Nemours. |
| 1516–? | | Lorenzo II de'Medici | Leo X (1513–1521) | Also Captain General: commanded the papal army in the War of Urbino (1517), before being wounded at the siege of Mondolfo |
| 1519–? | | Federico II Gonzaga | Julius II (1503–1513) | Also Duke of Mantua and Captain General of the Church, as well as Captain General of the Republic of Venice. Was not required to oppose the Holy Roman Empire and so failed to intervene in the Sack of Rome |
| 1 February 1537 – 1547 | | Pier Luigi Farnese, Duke of Parma | Paul III (1534–1549) | Son of Paul III; also Duke of Parma, Piacenza, and Castro. |
| 1547–1551 | | Ottavio Farnese | Paul III (1534–1549) | Son of Pier Luigi Farnese; also Duke of Parma, Piacenza, and Castro |
| c. 1565 | | Jacques Annibal de Hohenembs | | (or Count Hannibal of Altemps.) |
| 1566–? | | Ottavio Farnese | Pius V (1566–1572) | Second term. |
| 1572–1585 | | Giacomo Boncompagni | Gregory XIII (1572–1585) | Son; also Captain General of Spanish Milan, purchased the Duchies of Sora and Arce, Aquino and Arpino. Removed as Gonfalonier upon the election of Pope Sixtus V. |
| c.1621–? | | Odoardo Farnese | Gregory XV (1621–1623) | Also Duke of Parma and Piacenza. Excommunicated and prohibited from use of Gonfalonier emblems by Pope Urban VIII. |
| ?–1630 | | Carlo Barberini | Urban VIII (1623–1644) | Brother of Pope Urban VIII and Antonio Marcello Barberini. Father of Taddeo Barberini. |
| 1630–1636(?) | | Torquato Conti | Urban VIII (1623–1644) | Duke of Guadagnolo and Field Marshal of the Holy Roman Empire |
| 1639–1644 | | Taddeo Barberini | Urban VIII (1623–1644) | Nephew of Pope Urban VIII and Prince of Palestrina. Appointed Commander of the Papal Army during the Wars of Castro. Went into exile after the 1644 election of Pope Innocent X and died, without returning to Rome, in 1647. Dates are approximate. |
| 1649–? | | Maffeo Barberini | Innocent X (1644–1655) | Son of Taddeo Barberini who was appointed to his father's previous titles after the reconciliation of the Pamphili and Barberini families. |
| ?–1689 | | Livio Odescalchi | Innocent XI (1676–1689) | Nephew of Innocent XI; also Captain General |

== See also ==
- Gonfaloniere
- Gonfalone of the Church
- Captain General of the Church
