= Captain General of the Church =

Commander-in-chief of the armed forces of the Papal States

The captain general of the Church (Italian: Capitano generale della Chiesa) was the de facto commander-in-chief of the Papal States' armed forces (generally, the Papal Army and the Papal Navy) from the Middle Ages into the early modern period. The post was usually conferred on an Italian or other noble with a professional military reputation or (later) a relative of the pope.

The parallel office of gonfalonier was more a formal and ceremonial honor than the responsibility of a tactical military leader. The office was at times made subordinate to temporary offices.

For example, Pope Callixtus III appointed Cardinal Rodrigo Borgia (later Pope Alexander VI) as the chief and general commissary of the Papal Army. A number of such offices under many titles were used as ministers of war by popes, the captain general operated as a field commander under these offices. Pope Innocent XII removed both ranks and replaced them with the position of Flag-bearer of the Holy Roman Church (Vessilifero di Santo Romana Chiesa), which later became hereditary in the Naro Patrizi.

It was traditional for the captain general to carry a baton of command blessed by the pope.

== List of captains general ==
Captain General	Portrait	Appointing Pope	Notes
Charlemagne*		Leo III (798–816)	"It is safest to conclude that the pope desired that the royal patrician should regard himself as captain-general of the church, and that he should in that capacity be entitled to the military services of its subjects, when called on by the church to interfere for the protection of her temporary rights."
Guillaume Durand		Martin IV (1281–1285)	
James II of Aragon		Boniface VIII (1294–1303)	Gonfalonier, Admiral, and Captain General of the Church; compelled to wage war against his own brother (cf. Sicilian Vespers)
Philip VI of France		Benedict XII (1334–1342)	Circa August 1336
Louis I of Hungary		Innocent VI (1352–1362)	"Louis was appointed captain of the Church, with the duty of helping its armies against Francesco Ordelaffi and the other rebels in Romagna, when requested to do so by the pope or his legate."
Juan Fernández de Heredia		Innocent VI (1352–1362)	
Daniele del Carretto		Gregory XI (1370–1378)	
Carlo I Malatesta		Boniface IX (1389–1404)	"temporary vicar and captain-general of the church"
Braccio da Montone		Gregory XII (1406–1415)	Appointed in 1414; "Used the army nominally belonging to the Pope to conquer Perugia for himself"
Ranuccio Farnese il Vecchio		Eugene IV (1431–1447)	Appointed 1435; grandfather of Pope Paul III
Niccolò Piccinino		Eugene IV (1431–1447)	Appointed June 6, 1442; Condottiero; also the commander of the Duke of Milan's forces and thus "one of the first concrete indications" of the alliance between the pope and Milan
Jacques Cœur		Nicholas V (1447–1455)	Died as Captain General
Ludovico Trevisan		Callixtus III (1455–1458)	Trevisan played an important role in organizing the naval campaign against the Ottomans in December 1455, both responsible for the construction of the Papal Navy and appointed "apostolic legate, governor general, captain and general condottiere" in charge of it.
Giovanni I Ventimiglia, Marquess of Geraci (1445 and 1455)		Callixtus III (1455–1458)	
Pedro Luis de Borja			Also Prefect of Rome, not to be confused with Pedro Luis de Borja Lanzol de Romaní
Antonio Piccolomini		Pius II (1458–1464)	Son of the sister of Pius II; lay relative; salary of 2000 ducats a year and castellan of Castel Sant'Angelo; hereditary principate as Duke of Amalfi, conferred through King Ferrante, an office held by later papal relatives as well
Girolamo Riario		Sixtus IV (1471–1484)	Pazzi conspirator; brother of cardinal-nephew Pietro Riario; title later removed
Franceschetto Cybo		Innocent VIII (1484–1492)	Illegitimate son of Innocent VIII
Roberto Eustachio		Innocent VIII (1484–1492)	Former condottiero for Milan; led the campaign against Alfonso of Calabria; later returned to the service of the Republic of Venice
Niccolò di Pitigliano (Orsini)		Innocent VIII (1484–1492)	Appointed June 27, 1489, in the midst of a conflict with Ferrante
Giovanni Borgia		Alexander VI (1492–1503)	Son; also Duke of Gandia and Gonfalonier; assassinated by an unknown perpetrator, most likely his political enemies.
Cesare Borgia		Alexander VI (1492–1503)	Son; former cardinal-nephew, also Gonfalonier; often directly or indirectly accused of Giovanni's assassination, but unlikely to have been the actual culprit. Julius II, the "Warrior Pope", refused to confirm Cesare upon his election.
Francesco Maria I della Rovere		Julius II (1503–1513)	Son of Julius II's brother, Giovanni, and the adopted heir of Guidobaldo, Duke of Urbino; retained for one year after Julius II's death, paid 13,844 ducats plus a 30,000 ducat allowance for his company of 200 men-at-arms and 100 light cavalry
Giuliano di Lorenzo de' Medici		Leo X (1513–1521)	Giuliano's cousin Giulio (future Pope Clement VII) was papal legate to the army
Lorenzo II de' Medici, Duke of Urbino		Leo X (1513–1521)	Appointed after the death of Giuliano in 1516; initially commanded the Papal Army in the War of Urbino (1517)
Bernardo Dovizi		Leo X (1513–1521)	Appointed after the wounding of Lorenzo; commanded the Papal Army in the War of Urbino (1517)
Federico II, Duke of Mantua		Leo X (1513–1521)	Son of Isabella d'Este; also Gonfalonier; did not intervene in the Sack of Rome (1527)
Federico II, Duke of Mantua		Adrian VI (1522–1523)	Son of Isabella d'Este; also Gonfalonier; did not intervene in the Sack of Rome (1527)
Francesco Maria I della Rovere		Clement VII (1523–1535)	Reappointed by Clement VII after his dukedom had been stripped by Leo X and then reinstated by Adrian VI
Pier Luigi Farnese		Paul III (1534–1549)	Appointed February 2, 1537l; son of Paul III and former Gonfaloniere (appointed January 1535); held both titles simultaneously
Giambattista del Monte		Julius III (1550–1555)	Nephew of Julius III
Guidobaldo II della Rovere			
Giovanni Carafa		Paul IV (1555–1559)	Appointed after the resignation of Guidobaldo; nephew of Paul IV; allegedly "affable and incompetent"
Marcantonio Colonna		Gregory XIII (1572–1585)	Led the papal fleet during the Battle of Lepanto (1571)
Taddeo Barberini		Urban VIII (1623–1644)	Brother of cardinal-nephew Antonio Barberini Gaspare Altieri (c.1670) nephew of Pope Clement X, later Prince of Oriolo. Engraving by Abraham Brueghel and Nicolas Guerard of the "Wine of St. Martin: dedicated to Gaspare Altierti, Generale di Santa Chiesa.
Livio Odescalchi		Innocent XI (1676–1689)	Nephew of Innocent XI; also Gonfalonier
Antonio Ottoboni		Alexander VIII (1689–1691)	

== See also ==
- Captain General, for similarly named ranks
- Gonfalonier of the Church
- Cardinal nephew
- Condottieri
- Papal States
