= La Giuditta =

To be distinguished from Giuditta a German operetta by Franz Lehár.

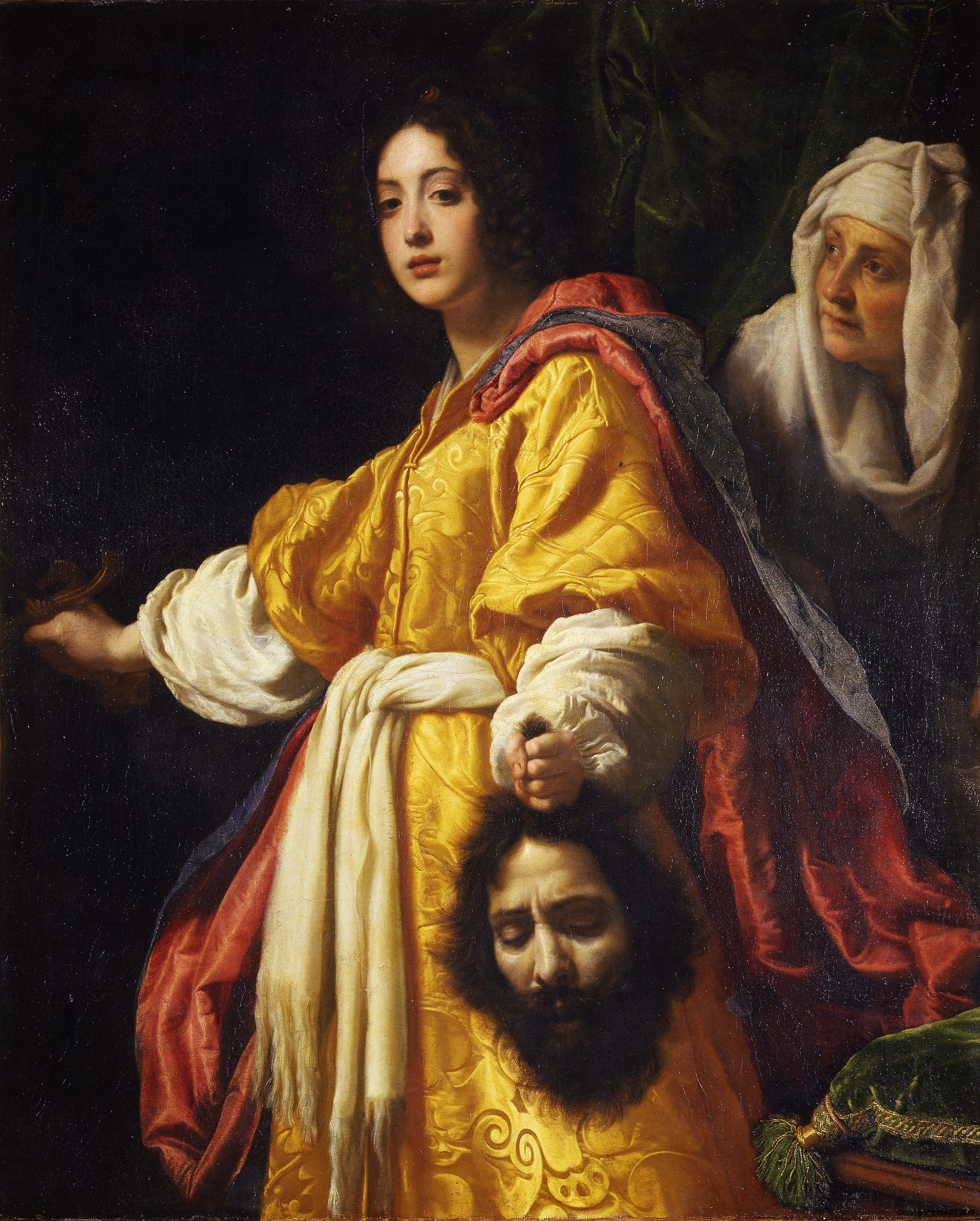
Judith with the Head of Holofernes by Cristofano Allori

La Giuditta may refer to any one of several Italian oratorios, as elaborated below, treating the figure of Judith, from the Biblical Apocrypha, who liberated her besieged home town of Bethulia by seducing and then beheading Holofernes, commander of the forces laying the siege. Those are the two roles common to all versions; other characters, such as Achior in the first Scarlatti version, a captain so revolted by Holofernes' brutality that he defects, are incidental to one version.

== Italian-language oratorios ==
=== Scarlatti's first La Giuditta (1693) ===
Alessandro Scarlatti: La Giuditta, Rome, 1693, for five voices, strings and continuo; libretto by Cardinal Pietro Ottoboni. "Scarlatti considered [La Giuditta] his finest oratorio, and its dramatic structure, rapidly interweaving brief scenes in Holofernes' camp with events in the troubled city, is remarkable." (Note: this quotation is from a review of the Gester recording, but the composer's sentiment as expressed pertains to his tighter second version, below, not recorded by Gester.) Recordings:

- Capella Savaria (Budapest), dir. Nicholas McGegan, Hungaroton HCD 12910; Giuditta: Mária Zádori, Ozia: Katalin Gèmes, Oloferne: Drew Minter, Achior (Capitano): Guy de Mey, Sacerdote: József Gregor; publ. 1988
- Parlement de Musique (Strasbourg), dir. Martin Gester, Ambronay Éditions AMY 004; Giuditta: Céline Ricci, Ozia: Adriana Fernández, Oloferne: Martín Oro, Achior (Capitano): Vincenzo Di Donato, Sacerdote: Bruno Rostand; publ. 2005

=== Scarlatti's second La Giuditta (1697) ===
Alessandro Scarlatti: La Giuditta, Rome or Naples 1697, for three voices, strings and continuo; libretto by Prince Antonio Ottoboni, father of the cardinal. This is not a revision but a new work altogether. A smaller setting, it is known today as the "Cambridge" Giuditta because its manuscript is conserved in the Rowe Music Library of King's College, Cambridge. Recordings:

- Alessandro Stradella Consort, dir. Estevan Velardi, Bongiovanni 2006; Giuditta: Rosita Frisani, Oloferne: Mario Nuvoli, Nutrice: Marco Lazzara
- The Queen's Chamber Band, dir. Elaine Comparone, Albany 2007; Giuditta: Julianne Baird, Oloferne: Philip Anderson, Nutrice: Marshall Coid
- Ensemble Baroque di Nice, dir. Gilbert Bezzina, live 2008; Giuditta: Sophie Landy, Oloferne: Carl Ghazarossian, Nutrice: Raphaël Pichon

=== Almeida's La Giuditta (1726) ===
Francisco António de Almeida: La Giuditta. Recording:

- Concerto Köln, dir. René Jacobs, Harmonia Mundi; Giuditta: Lena Lootens, Oloferne: Martyn Hill, Achiorre: Francesca Congiu, Ozias: Axel Köhler

=== Metastasio's libretto on the same subject ===
- Metastasio's libretto, printed in some editions as Giuditta, is better known as Betulia liberata ("The Liberation of Bethulia"), K. 118, 1771. The original libretto by Metastasio was for Georg Reutter II (1734), and also set by 30 other composers, including the 15-year-old Mozart.

=== Other composers ===
- Marco da Gagliano La Giuditta 1626; three-act opera (lost), libretto Andrea Salvadori, used as the basis for the Judith of Martin Opitz (1635).
- Maurizio Cazzati, Bologna 24 March 1668. Libretto Count Astorre Orsi.
- Antonio Draghi, Vienna 1668
- Marc' Antonio Ziani Vienna 1686
- Antonio Lotti La Giuditta a 3 voci, Vienna 1701
- Carlo Badia, Vienna 1704
- Benedetto Marcello, 1709 to his own libretto
- Carlo Badia (second setting), Vienna 1710
- Giuseppe Porsile, Vienna 1723

== Latin oratorios ==
These oratorios are generally listed under Latin names:

- Vivaldi: Juditha triumphans
