= Giambattista Rubini =

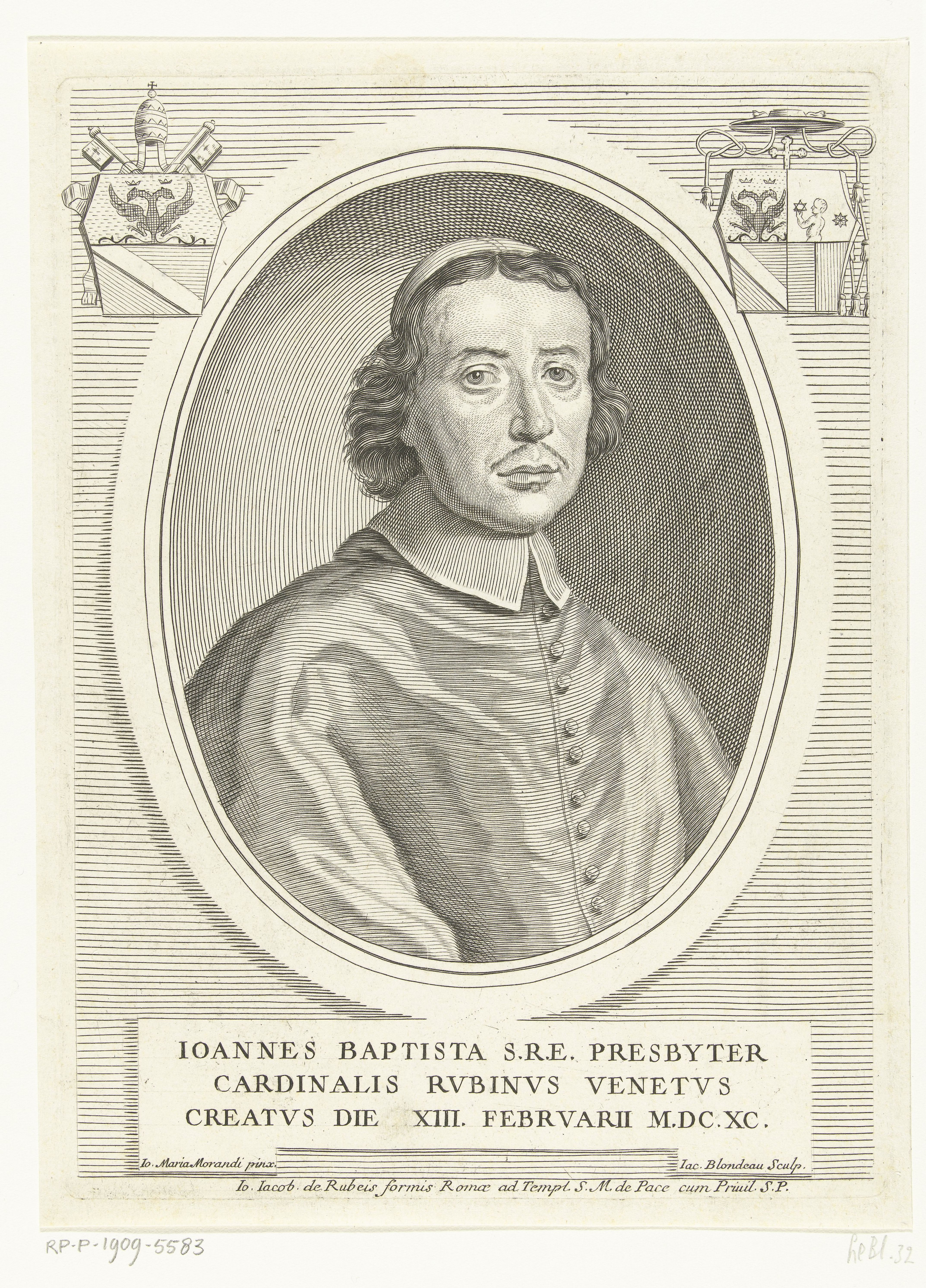
Giambattista Rubini

Giambattista Rubini (1642 – 17 February 1707) was a cardinal of the Catholic Church from 1690 to 1707.

== Early life and career ==
Giambattista Rubini was born in Venice in 1642, the second son of Donato Rubini and Cristina Medici. His grandmother, Cristina Ottoboni, was the sister of Pope Alexander VIII.

He was educated at the University of Padua, becoming a doctor of both laws.

He became a canon of Padua Cathedral at an early age. After law school, he moved to Rome to become Referendary of the Apostolic Signatura. He later became governor of the cities of Fabriano, Spoleto, Frosinone, Viterbo, and Macerata. He then went on to be governor of the Campagne and Maritime Province, Umbria, and the March of Ancona.

Rubini received the minor orders on 10 September 1683; became a subdeacon on 12 September 1683; and was made a deacon on 19 September 1683. He was ordained to the priesthood on 21 September 1683.

On 15 May 1684, the cathedral chapter of Vicenza Cathedral elected him to be Bishop of Vicenza. He was consecrated as a bishop by Cardinal Alessandro Crescenzi on 21 May 1684.

== Cardinalate ==
Rubini's great-uncle, Pope Alexander VIII, named him Cardinal Secretary of State in October 1689. The pope made him a cardinal priest in the consistory of 13 February 1690. On 10 April 1690, he received the red hat and the titular church of San Lorenzo in Panisperna. He was made papal legate to Urbino on 27 September 1690.

After Alexander VIII's death, Rubini participated in the papal conclave of 1691, which elected Pope Innocent XII, who did not name Rubini as his Secretary of State.

He later participated in the papal conclave of 1700, which elected Pope Clement XI. He resigned as Bishop of Vicenza on 25 March 1702. On 15 January 1703, he was named Camerlengo of the Sacred College of Cardinals, and he held that office until 14 January 1704. On 25 March 1706, he opted for the titular church of San Marco.

He died in Rome on 17 February 1707. He was buried in the church of San Marco.

Military offices
Catholic Church titles
| Preceded by Toussaint de Forbin-Janson | Camerlengo of the Sacred College of Cardinals; 1703—1704 | Succeeded by Tommaso Maria Ferrari |
