= Ottoboni family =

Pope Alexander VIII's coat of arms.

The Ottoboni were an aristocratic Venetian family, who gained prominence in Rome after the 17th century, mainly due to the papacy of Alexander VIII and his cardinal nephew, Pietro Ottoboni, known for his patronage of musicians and painters. Cardinal Ottoboni's acceptance of a role representing France at the Holy See was objected to by the Serene Republic, whose senate had not been consulted first. A recent infraction of the rule that no Venetian citizen should serve a foreign power without the express leave of the Serenissima rankled at Venice: Cardinal Vincenzo Grimani had moved to Vienna in 1699 and was appointed viceroy of Naples in 1708. Cardinal Ottoboni did not placate the Senate, and the Ottoboni were ceremonially erased from the Libro d'Oro and their properties confiscated. The diplomatic rupture between France and Venice was soon smoothed over, but the Ottoboni remained in disgrace.

- Pope Alexander VIII (born Pietro Vito Ottoboni; 1610–1691)
- Antonio Ottoboni (1646–1720), Captain General of the Church, nephew of Alexander VIII
- Pietro Ottoboni (cardinal) (1667–1740), grandnephew of Alexander VIII
