= François de Mailly =

18th-century Roman Catholic bishop

His Eminence François de Mailly
- Cardinal, Archbishop of Reims
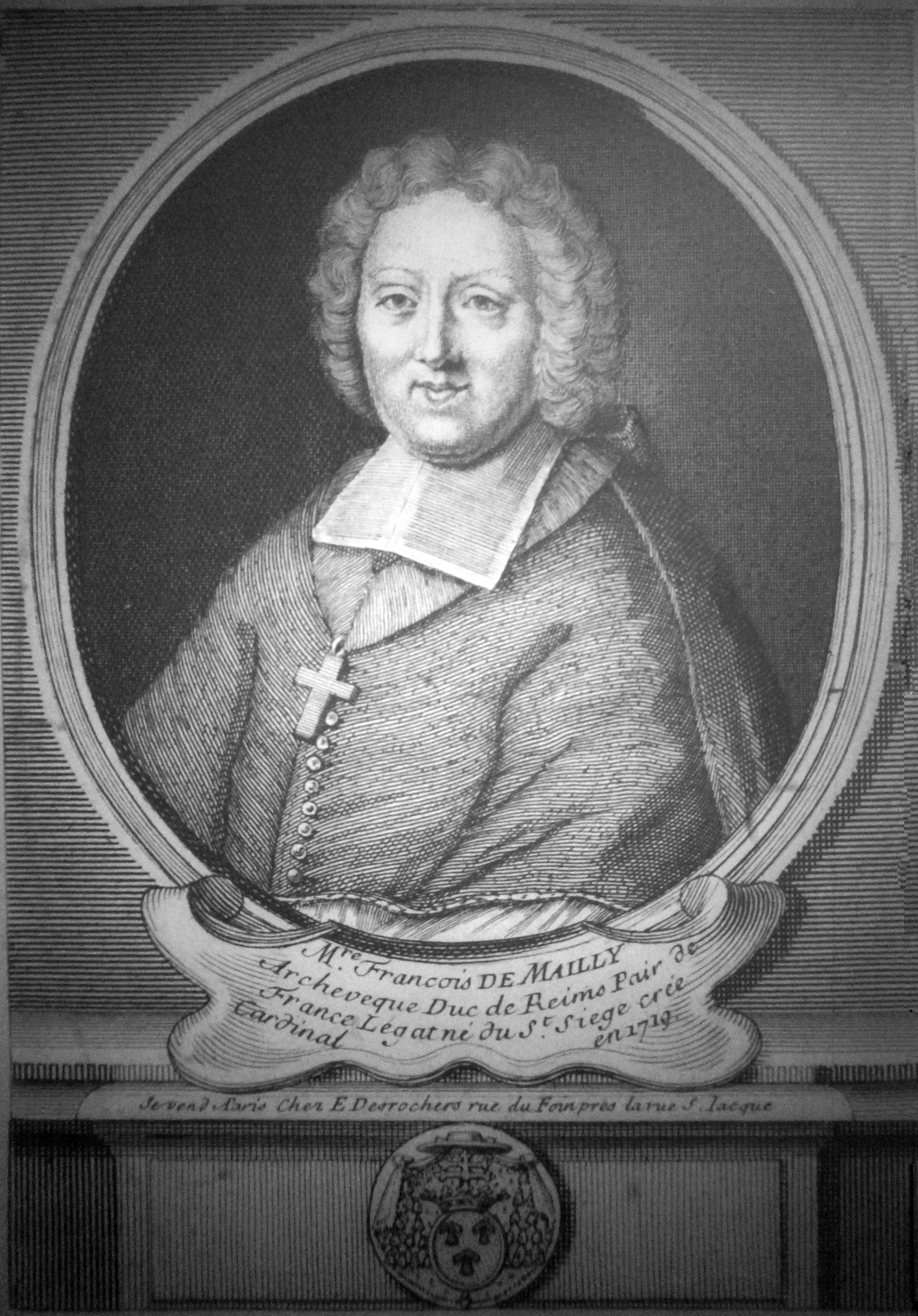
- Church: Roman Catholic Church

Orders
- Consecration: 11 May 1698 by Toussaint de Forbin de Janson
- Created cardinal: 29 November 1719 by Pope Clement XI

Personal details
- Born: 4 March 1658 Paris, Kingdom of France
- Died: 13 September 1721 (age 63)

François de Mailly (1658–1721) was a French archbishop and Cardinal.

== Family ==
De Mailly was the third son of Louis-Charles de Nesle, Marquis de Nesle, and Jeanne de Monchi. His brother, Victor Augustin, was bishop of Lavaur (1692–1713).

== Biography ==
Born at Nesle, he had ultramontane views, and was a stern opponent of Jansenism. He was a critic of Jean Meslier.

On 11 May 1698, he was consecrated bishop by Toussaint de Forbin de Janson, Bishop of Beauvais, with Gabriel de Roquette, Bishop of Autun, and François Chevalier de Saulx, Bishop of Alès, serving as co-consecrators.

He was Archbishop of Arles from 1697 to 1710, and then Archbishop of Reims from 1710.

He was named a cardinal by Pope Clement XI on 29 November 1719; his red biretta was sent to him in France on 23 December 1719. He did not visit Rome, and was not assigned a titular church. He was invested with his biretta by King Louis XV personally, and granted the abbey of S. Étienne de Caen.

He died in Reims on 13 September 1721, and was buried in the cathedral.

== Sources ==
- Albanès, Joseph Hyacinthe; Ulysse Chevalier (1901). Gallia christiana novissima: Arles (in Latin). Valence: Soc. anonyme d'imprimerie montbéliardasie. pp. 990–995.
- Fisquet, Honoré (1867). La France pontificale (Gallia christiana): Arles, Embrun (in French). Vol. 2 (2nd ed.). Paris: E. Repos.
- Ritzler, Remigius; Sefrin, Pirminus (1952). Hierarchia catholica medii et recentis aevi (in Latin). Vol. 5 (V) (1667-1730). Patavii: Messagero di S. Antonio.
