= Philosophical sin =

Theological concept

The existence of philosophical sin, also called moral sin, was a debate waged in the Catholic Church in the late seventeenth century. A philosophical sin is a morally bad act which violates the natural order of reason, not the divine law. The idea of philosophical sin, as opposed to theological sin, was advocated by those who wished to construct a moral system independent of God. It has been censured and opposed as a doctrine by the Catholic Church since the 17th century.

== Stances ==
Those who believed in God and divine law yet contended for a distinction between philosophical and theological sin maintained that there are morally bad acts that, while violating the order of reason, are not offensive to God. They believed that the sinner can be ignorant of the existence of God and that, without the knowledge or consideration of God, it is impossible to offend him.

This doctrine of philosophical sin was censured as scandalous, temerarious, and erroneous by Pope Alexander VIII in 1690 in his condemnation of the following proposition:

Philosophical or moral sin is a human act not in agreement with rational nature and right reason; theological and mortal sin is a free transgression of the Divine law. However grievous it may be, philosophical sin in one who is either ignorant of God or does not actually think of God, is indeed a grievous sin, but not an offense to God, nor a mortal sin dissolving friendship with God, nor worthy of eternal punishment.

The Catholic Church maintains the contrary view that sin can be offensive to God even if the sinner either does not know or does not consider God.
