= Santa Eufemia del Arroyo =

Coordinates: 41°54′N 5°16′W

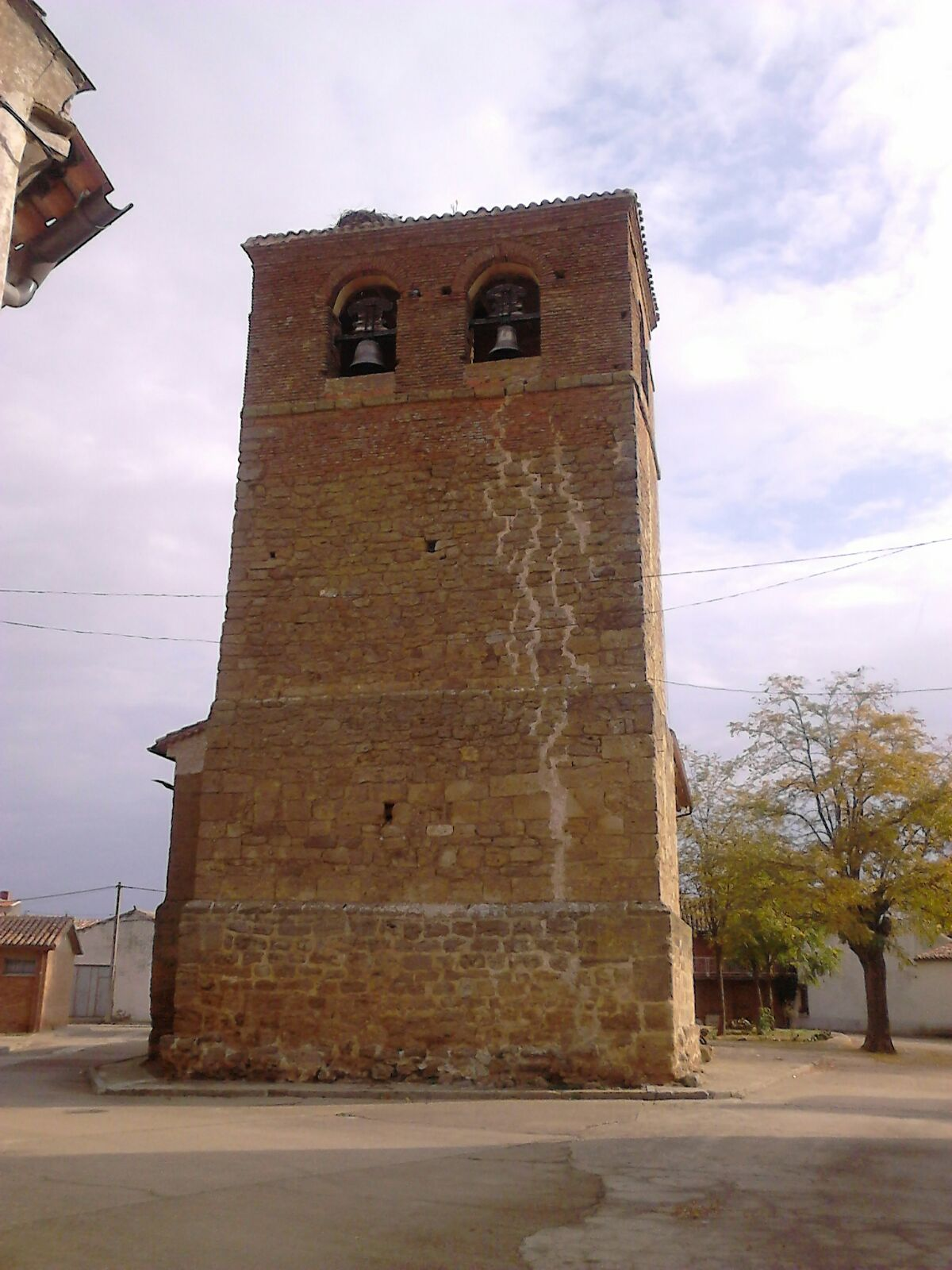
- Church of Santa Eufemia del Arroyo.
- Interactive map of Santa Eufemia del Arroyo
- Country: Spain
- Autonomous community: Castile and León
- Province: Valladolid
- Municipality: Santa Eufemia del Arroyo

Area
  - Total: 24 km^{2} (9.3 sq mi)

Population (2025-01-01)
  - Total: 78
  - Density: 3.3/km^{2} (8.4/sq mi)
- Time zone: UTC+1 (CET)
  - Summer (DST): UTC+2 (CEST)

Santa Eufemia del Arroyo is a municipality located in the province of Valladolid, Castile and León, Spain. According to the 2004 census (INE), the municipality has a population of 144 inhabitants.

== See also ==
- Tierra de Campos
