= Gonfaloniere =

Prestigious communal office in medieval and Renaissance Italy

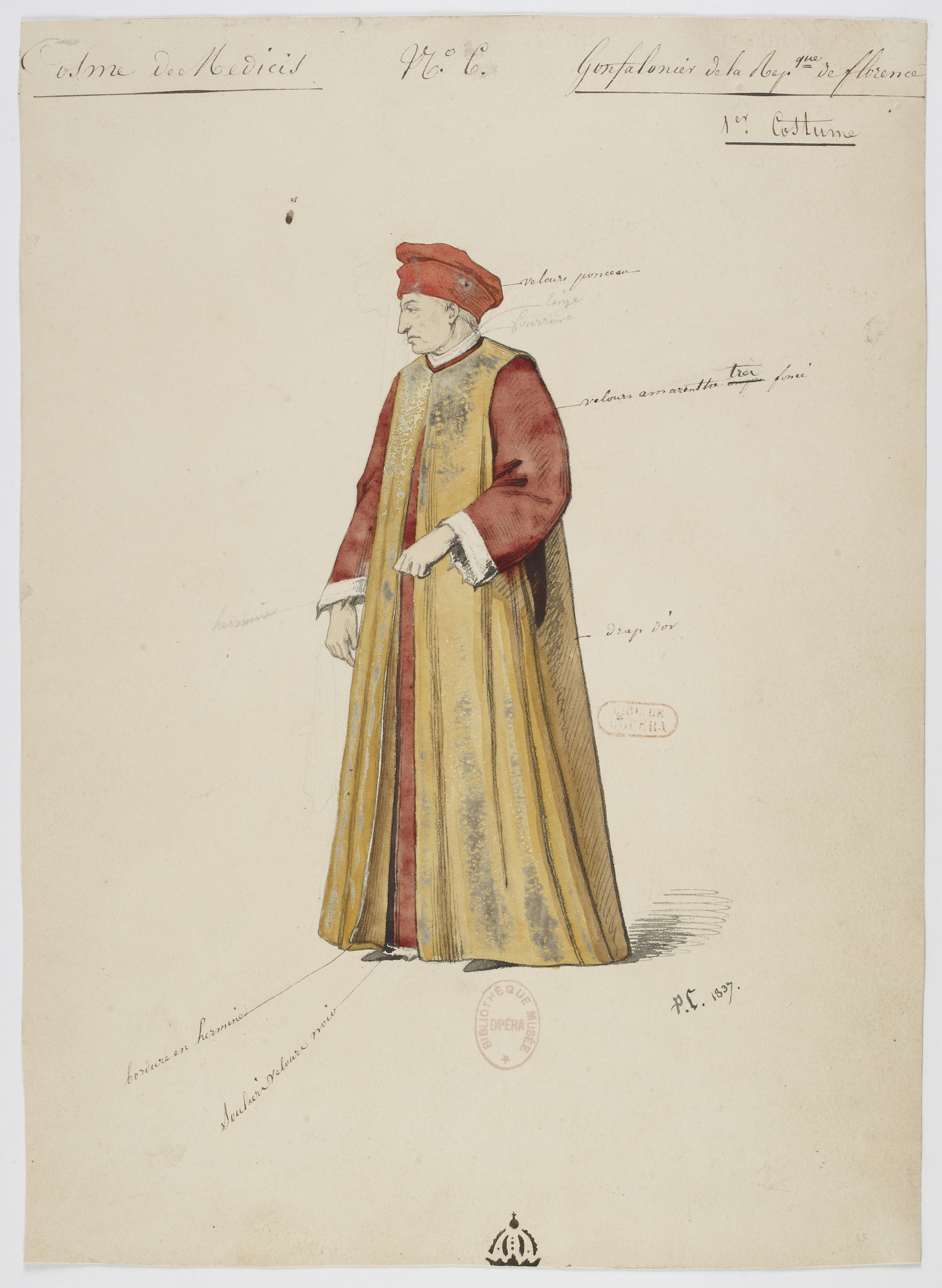
Gonfalonier from the Republic of Florence by Paul Lormier (1813–1895)

The Gonfalonier (Italian: Gonfaloniere) was the holder of a highly prestigious communal office in medieval and Renaissance Italy, notably in Florence and the Papal States. The name derives from gonfalone (English: "gonfalon"), the term used for the banners of such communes.

The title originated from Florence in the 1250s. The holders were known as the head of the militia. A similar office known as Gonfaloniere of Justice (Gonfaloniere di Giustizia) was made to protect the interests of the people. They became part of the city's government, or Signoria.

Other central and northern Italian communes, from Spoleto to the County of Savoy, elected or appointed gonfalonieri. The Bentivoglio family of Bologna aspired to this office during the sixteenth century. However, by 1622, when Artemisia Gentileschi painted a portrait of Pietro Gentile as a gonfaloniere of Bologna, with the gonfalone in the background, the office had merely symbolic value.

== See also ==
- Capitano del popolo
- Condottieri
- Gonfalonier of the Church
- Podestà
