= Pedro Luis de Borja Lanzol de Romaní =

Cardinal

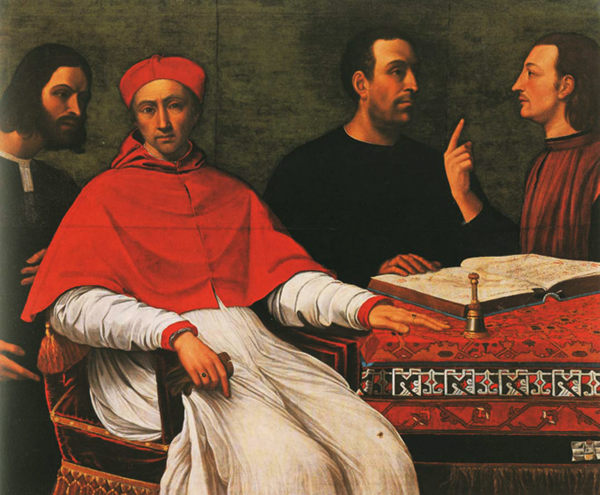
Portrait of Cardinal Pedro Luis de Borja Lanzol de Romaní

Pedro Luis de Borja Lanzol de Romaní, O.S.Io.Hieros. (1472 – 4 October 1511) was a Roman Catholic cardinal and cardinal-nephew and papal military leader. He received a wide variety of sinecures during the papacy of his great-uncle, Pope Alexander VI, but was exiled to Naples on the election of Borja rival Pope Julius II. Borja also fought with the Knights Hospitaller in Jerusalem and Rhodes.

== Early life ==
He was born in Valencia, Spain, the third of the eight children of Jofré de Borja Lanzol de Romaní and Juana Moncada in 1472. In his early military career, he became a Knight of the Order of St. John of Jerusalem and Knight of Rhodes. When he tried to take Fray Francisco de Boxols's post as the priorate of the Order in Aragon in 1498, Ferdinand II of Aragon ("Fernando the Catholic") through his ambassador in Rome attempted to have Borja's appointment annulled; Borja was instead made Prior of the Order in Santa Eufemia.

== Cardinal and bishop ==
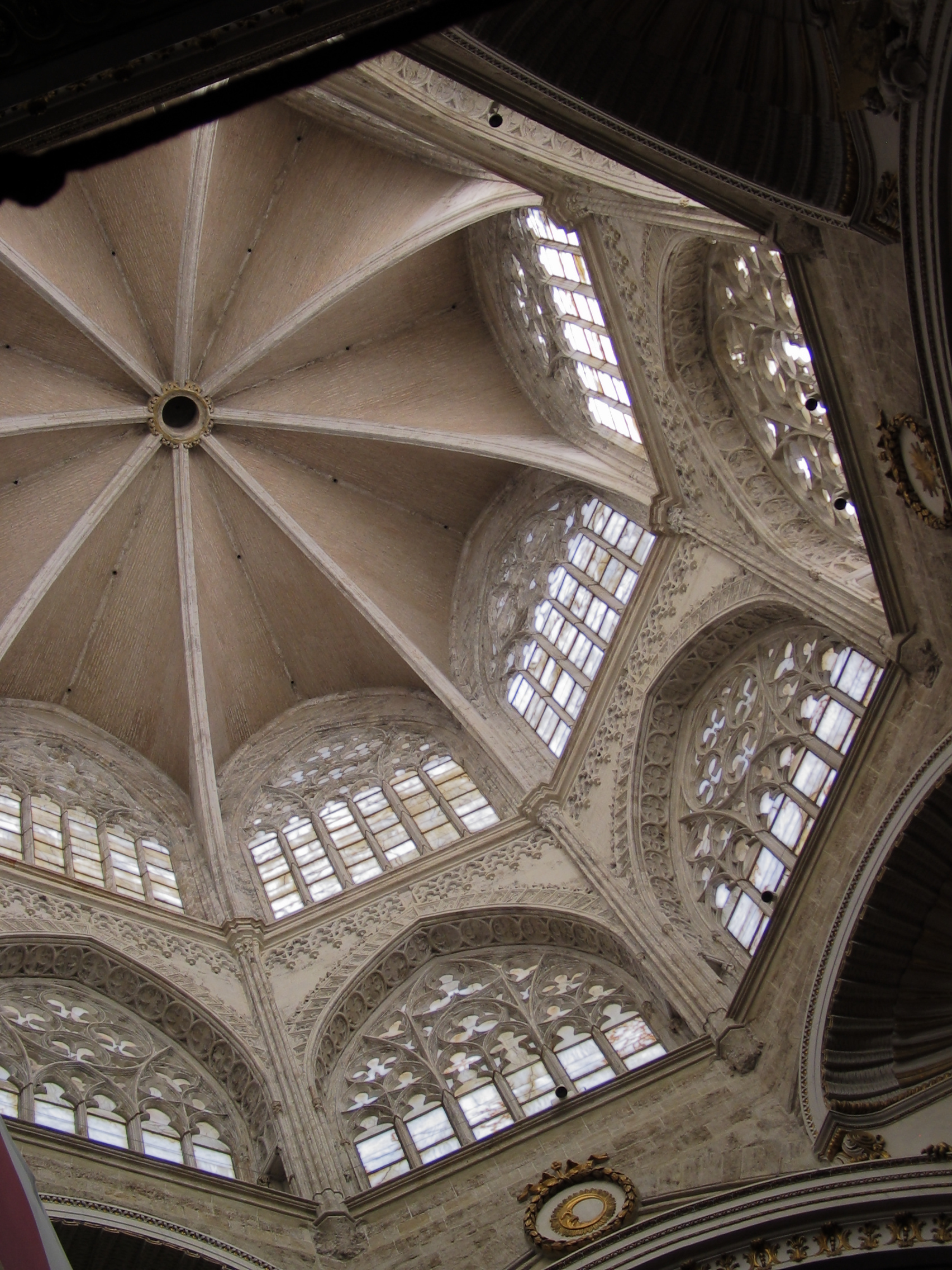
The Cathedral of Valencia, which Borja never visited during his tenure as archbishop of Valencia, a post held by a Borja since 1429

On 20 March 1500 his grand uncle Pope Alexander VI created him cardinal deacon in pectore; Borja's cardinalate was published during another consistory on 28 September 1500 and he was formally given the Red Hat on 2 October 1500; effective from 5 October 1500 his deaconry was S. Maria in Via Lata.

While already a cardinal, Borja was elected archbishop of Valencia, a post he would hold until his death, on 29 July 1500, succeeding his brother, Juan. Borja would never visit the diocese as archbishop; instead he took possession of it through a procurator, Guillem Ramón de Centelles, on 29 August 1500. There is no evidence that he was ever consecrated, although he received the post of penitentiary major on the condition that he receive priestly ordination, which he did in 1502, assuming the post on 7 December 1503; he would remain penitentiary until his death. After his ordination, he became cardinal priest S. Marcello on 7 December 1503, retaining his deaconry (and its revenues) in commendam.

Through the influence of his grand uncle, Borja also was given the titles of Governor of Spoleto (10 August 1500), Governor of Bagnoregio, Abbot commendatario of the Cistercian Monastery of Santa María de la Valldigna, and of the Benedictine monastery of S. Simpliciano in Milan. Alexander VI's bull creating the University of Valencia on 23 January 1501 is attributed to Borja's influence.

When Borja reached Rome on 17 June 1501, (through the "Popolo" gate), he was received by his brother Rodrigo, the captain of the Palatine Guard.

== After the death of Alexander VI ==
As a cardinal elector, he participated in the papal conclaves of September and October 1503. The latter elected Pope Julius II, despite the opposition of Borja, and Julius II proceeded to detain Cesare Borgia, causing Pedro to flee Rome on 20 December 1503, along with Cardinal Francisco de Remolins. With him he came to Naples.

Julius II invited Borja to return to Rome on 2 January 1504 and freed his cousin Cesare from jail so that he could join him in Naples in April. A 3 February 1504 letter from the Spanish monarchs to their ambassador in Rome inquired whether the pope was amenable to Borja and Remolins in Naples, shortly after which rumors of Borja circulated in Spain. He later became the archpriest of the Basilica di Santa Maria Maggiore in Rome (May 1510). King Fernando wrote again requesting that a successor archbishop be named without his nomination. Upon hearing similarly false news of the death of Julius II, Borja and Remolins together set out for Rome.

Borja died on 4 October 1511 by falling from a horse while returning from Rome to Naples. He was buried in the church of San Pietro a Majella in Naples without a funerary monument.
