= Torquato Conti =

- Duke of Guadagnolo
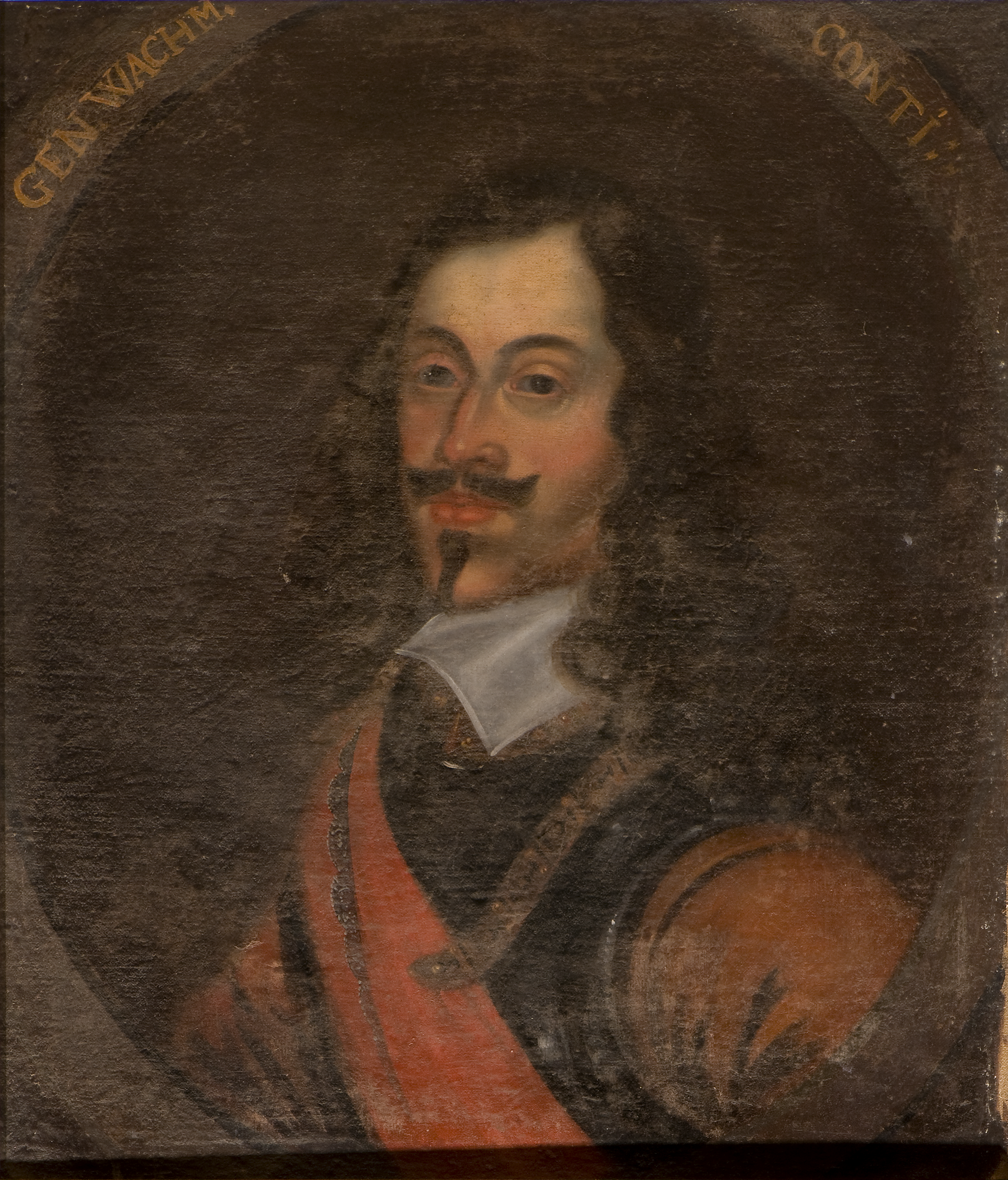
- Other titles: Field Marshal of the Holy Roman Empire, Gonfalonier of the Church
- Born: 1591; Rome
- Died: 6 June 1636 (aged 44–45); Ferrara
- Wife: Felice Sassatelli-Bevilacqua
- Father: Lotario Conti, Duke of Poli
- Mother: Clarice Orsini

Torquato Conti (1591–1636) was an Italian military commander who served as a General-Field Marshal of the Holy Roman Empire during the Thirty Years' War. His barbarous treatment of defenceless villagers earned him the nickname, The Devil. He later became a nobleman and was made Duke of Guadagnolo and Gonfalonier of the Church by Pope Urban VIII.

== Early life ==
Conti was born in 1591 at Rome, the son of Lotario Conti (Duke of Poli) and his first wife Clarice Orsini (Lotario Conti had 14 children in total by two wives). He was the grandson of another Torquato Conti (1519–1571) and thus the nephew of Cardinal Carlo Conti. His father suggested an ecclesiastic career and to that end, he studied under the tutelage of Cardinal Odoardo Farnese, a relative of the wife of his grandfather Torquato, Violante Farnese. For reasons unknown, he instead volunteered in the army of the Spanish Empire.

In 1616, Conti commanded a company of infantry against Charles Emmanuel I, Duke of Savoy (who was supported by the Kingdom of France) in an unsuccessful attempt to maintain the Spanish occupation of Alba. Alba was retaken by the Duke of Savoy and Conti, having survived the battle, went to Germany.

== Thirty Years' War ==
The development of Conti's military career generally followed the development of the Thirty Years' War and he fought in a number of early battles and sieges at the beginning of the war.

In Germany, Conti commanded the Italian volunteers fighting for Ferdinand II, who in 1619 became Holy Roman Emperor. Conti was promoted to lieutenant colonel and Regimental Chief in the interceding years before commanding troops loyal to Charles Bonaventure de Longueval, Count of Bucquoy first at the Siege of Pilsen and then at the Battle of White Mountain in 1620. He continued with Count of Bucquoy and commanded troops during the Siege of Érsekújvár where Bucquoy was killed. Conti led a contingent to recover the body of the count but was captured.

When he was released several months later, Ferdinand II rewarded his bravery by giving him command of the garrison at Olomouc. He continued to defend the city against attacks from Gábor Bethlen. In 1622, Conti left Olomouc and took part in the Battle of Wimpfen. For his loyalty he was promoted to colonel and chamberlain.

=== Pontificate of Urban VIII ===
In 1623, Maffeo Barberini was elected to the papal throne as Pope Urban VIII and Conti went to Valtellina as a commander of papal troops. Valtellina saw significant conflict during the Thirty Years' War as each side of the Bourbon–Habsburg rivalry tried to gain control of the passes between Lombardy and Austria. For his service there, the pope rewarded Conti by naming him Duke of Guadagnolo and General of the Papal Army. Shortly after he was named Ordnance Master (similar to the British Master-General of the Ordnance) of the army of the Holy Roman Emperor.

In 1626 he returned to Germany and commanded units loyal to Albrecht von Wallenstein during the Battle of Dessau Bridge. The following year, while von Wallenstein was elsewhere fighting Christian IV of Denmark, Conti commanded Imperial troops at Holstein.

=== Gartz and Greifenhagen ===
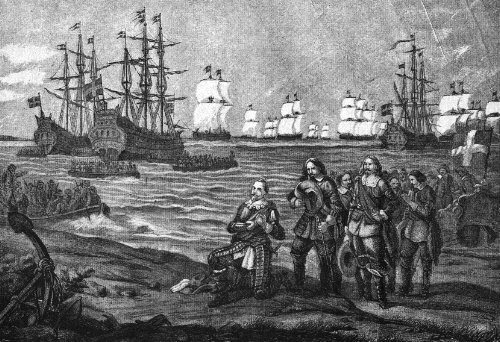
King Gustavus Adolphus lands in Pomerania.

In 1629, Conti became ill and removed himself from front line fighting. He was installed as Field Marshal and commander of garrisoned troops in Pomerania after the Capitulation of Franzburg; specifically the strategic Oder River crossing towns of Gartz and Greifenhagen.

The beginning of the Swedish intervention (1630–1635) in the Thirty Years' War saw King Gustavus Adolphus of Sweden and his troops enter the Holy Roman Empire via the Duchy of Pomerania. Conti rode out from Gartz and Greifenhagen and to meet the Swedish landing force. On 9 July, Swedish forces took Stettin (now Szczecin), but throughout 1630 were content with establishing themselves in the Oder estuary. The Duchy of Pomerania capitulated and Bogislaw XIV, Duke of Pomerania, and his councillors negotiated the Treaty of Stettin with King Gustavus Adolphus.

== Retreat ==
Forced to retreat from the advancing Swedish army of King Gustavus Adolphus, Conti ordered his troops to burn houses, destroy villages and generally cause as much harm to property and people as possible, a military strategy known as scorched earth. His actions were remembered thus:

To revenge himself upon the Duke of Pomerania, the imperial general permitted his troops, upon his retreat, to exercise every barbarity on the unfortunate inhabitants of Pomerania, who had already suffered but too severely from his avarice. On pretence of cutting off the resources of the Swedes, the whole country was laid waste and plundered; and often, when the Imperialists were unable any longer to maintain a place, it was laid in ashes, in order to leave the enemy nothing but ruins.

And by another:

For his lawless depredations and exactions, which had earned for him the name of The Devil among the common people of the North of Germany, as well as in Jutland and Holstein.

When one village complained of the treatment they had received, Conti ordered them to be stripped naked so that they would "have sure grounds for complaints". Conti's actions have led some to suggest that Duke Bogislaw and his people were driven into the arms of the Swedes. They saw King Gustavus Adolphus as a far better alternative to the violent rampaging Torquato Conti and his Imperial troops. Faced with the choice, the Treaty of Stettin may have seemed less like a capitulation and more like a rescue to the people of Pomerania.

== Retirement and later life ==
In September Conti's commanding officer, von Wallenstein, was dismissed by the Emperor whose advisers were concerned he was planning a coup to take control of the Holy Roman Empire. At the same time, Conti launched an exploratory attack on Stettin but was repulsed. Seeing that King Gustavus Adolphus had no interest in attacking his position, Conti sent a message to the monarch suggesting a truce for the length of the oncoming winter. Angered by the devastation Conti had caused, the King responded: "The Swedes can fight in winter as well as in summer".

Suffering from illness (likely cancer) and disheartened by the King's rebuke, Conti resigned his post in favour of Colonel Hannß Casimir von Schaumberg. Both Gartz and Greifenhagen, where Conti had been garrisoned, were soon thereafter lost to the Swedes.

Conti travelled to Vienna where he received an honourable discharge and was appointed Gonfalonier of the Church by Pope Urban. He married Countess Felice Sassatelli-Bevilacqua in Ferrara but they had no children and Conti died there in 1636.

Conti was the uncle of Michelangelo Conti who was elected to the papal throne as Pope Innocent XIII, though Michelangelo was born 19 years after Torquato Conti died.

== See also ==
- List of Field Marshals of the Holy Roman Empire
