= Pietro Ottoboni (cardinal) =

Italian Catholic cardinal (1667–1740)

His Eminence Pietro Ottoboni
- Cardinal-Bishop of Ostia e Velletri
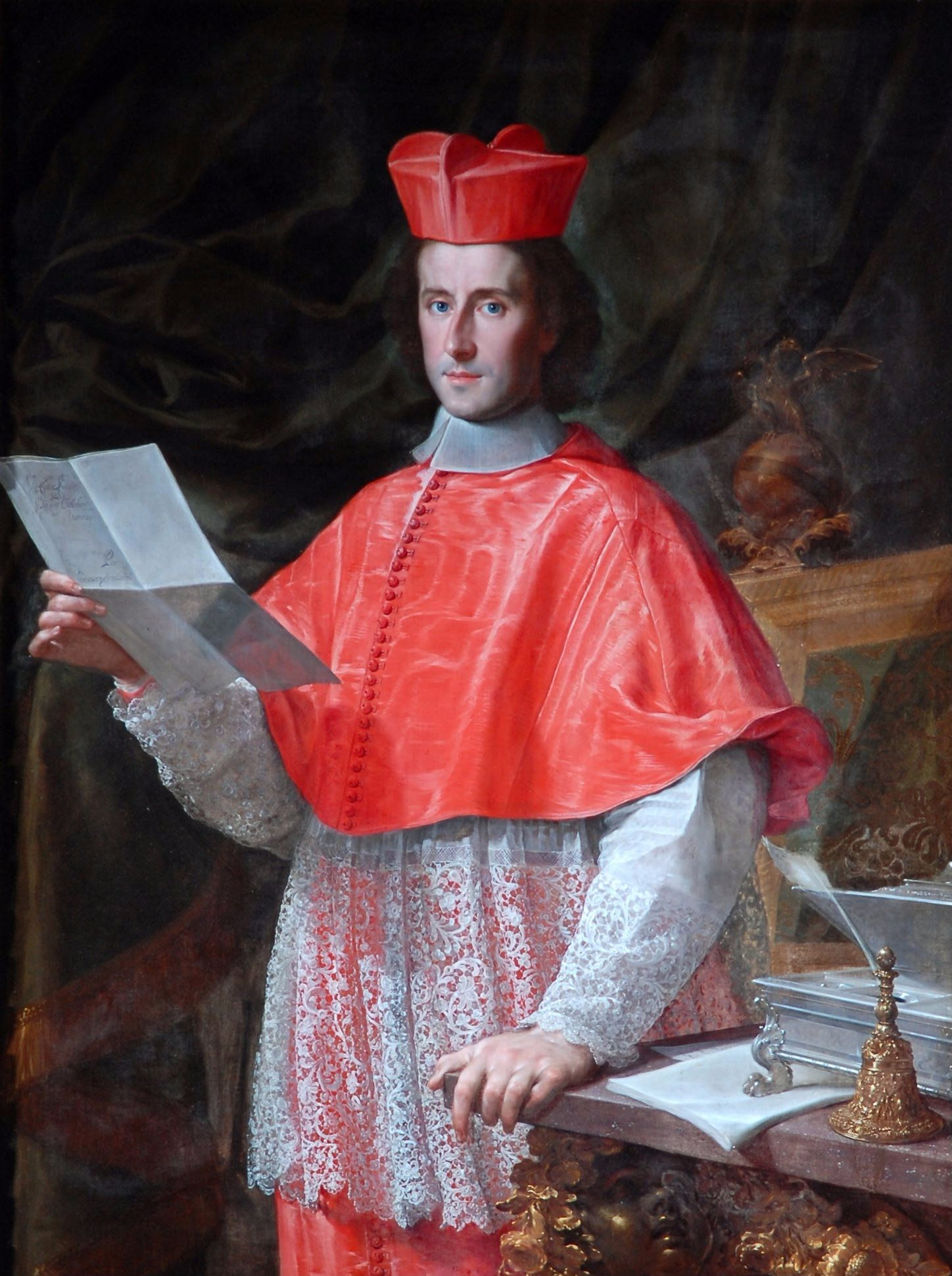
- Portrait by Francesco Trevisani
- Church: Catholic Church
- Appointed: 3 September 1738
- Term ended: 23 February 1740
- Other posts: Archpriest of the Archbasilica of Saint John Lateran; Vice-Chancellor of the Holy Roman Church; Secretary of the Roman Inquisition
- Previous posts: Cardinal-Bishop of Sabina (1725‍–‍1730); Cardinal-Bishop of Frascati (1730‍–‍1735)

Orders
- Ordination: 13 July 1724 (deacon); 14 July 1724 (priest)
- Consecration: 4 February 1725 by Benedict XIII
- Created cardinal: 7 November 1689 by Alexander VIII
- Rank: Cardinal-bishop

Personal details
- Born: 2 July 1667 Venice, Republic of Venice
- Died: 23 February 1740 (aged 72) Rome, Papal States
- Buried: San Lorenzo in Damaso
- Coat of arms

Pietro Ottoboni (2 July 1667 – 23 February 1740) was an Italian cardinal and grandnephew of Pope Alexander VIII, who was also born Pietro Ottoboni. He is remembered especially as a great patron of music and art. Ottoboni was the last person to hold the curial office of cardinal-nephew, which was abolished by Alexander's successor, Pope Innocent XII, in 1692. According to musicologist Ellen T. Harris, 18th-century biographer Michael Ranft described Ottoboni as someone who "loved pomp, prodigality, and sensual pleasure, but was in the same time kind, ready to serve, and charitable".

== Overview ==
Pietro was born on 2 July 1667 in Venice, son of Antonio Ottoboni and Maria Moretti. His family was noble Ottoboni family, whose most prominent member had been his granduncle Pope Alexander VIII (1689–1691). The family was invited into the nobility of Venice as a result of the battle of Zonchio (1499) and later met the financial qualifications for nobility in the 17th century after amassing a fortune in the diplomatic service.

Pietro was admitted to the clerical tonsure and minor orders on 20 October 1689 and was created cardinal deacon in the consistory of 7 November 1689, receiving the red hat on 14 November. The same day, he was appointed to the office of vice-chancellor of the Holy Roman Church, which he held till his death. He was also made governor of the cities of Fermo and Tivoli, as well as of the territory of Capranica.

He became cardinal-bishop of Sabina in 1725, cardinal-bishop of Frascati in 1730, cardinal-bishop of Porto and Santa Rufina in 1734, and vice-dean then dean of the Sacred College of Cardinals on 3 September 1738. Ottoboni was also Archpriest of the patriarchal Basilica of Saint Mary Major, secretary of the Roman Inquisition, Archpriest of the patriarchal Lateran Basilica (from 1730).

== Patron of the arts ==
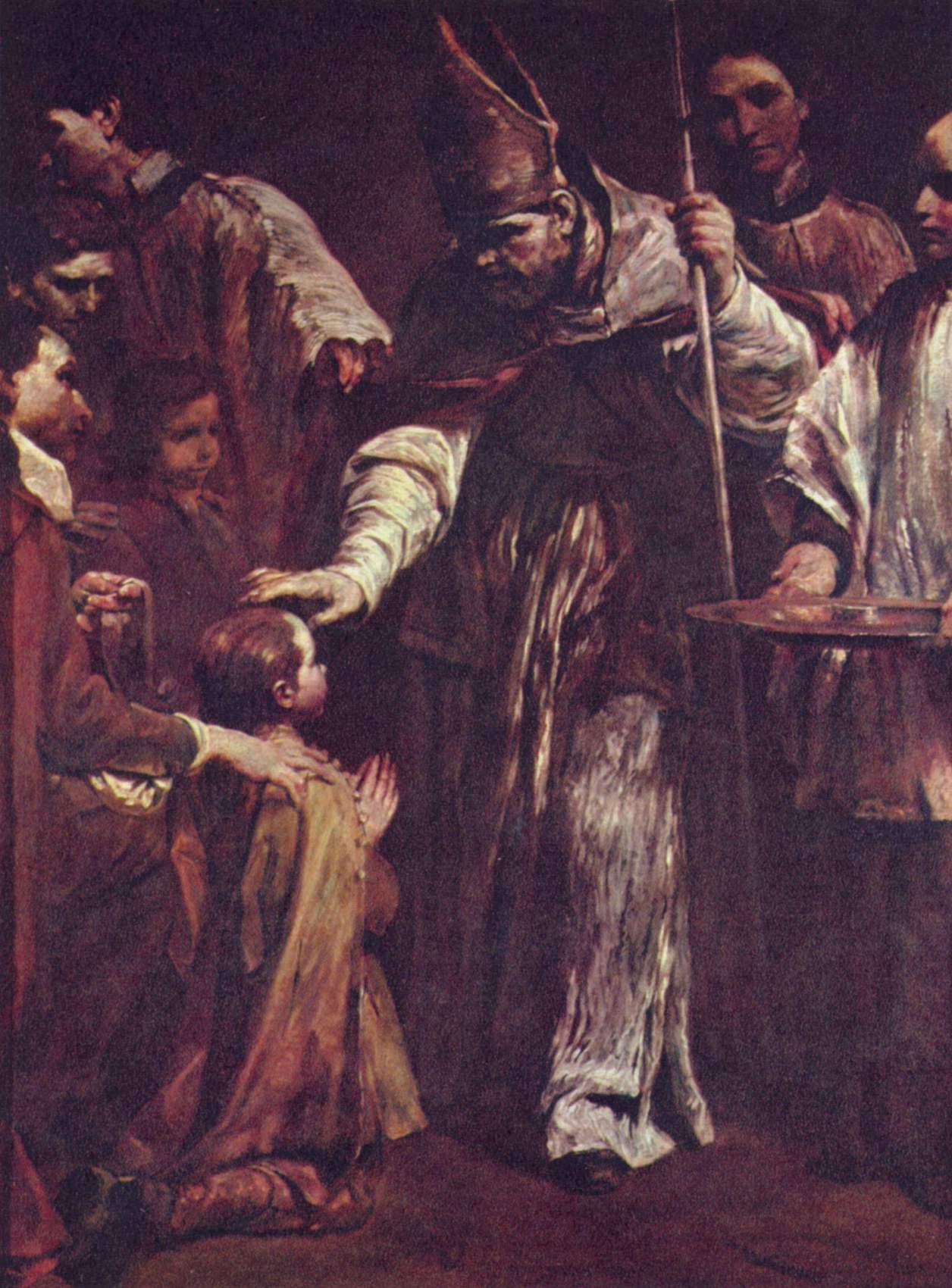
The Confirmation, from the Seven Sacraments series by Giuseppe Maria Crespi. Staatliche Kunstsammlungen, Dresden

Ottoboni was one of the great patrons of his generation. He resided in the Palazzo della Cancelleria, where he had begun to construct a theatre in 1689. The favourite of Cardinal Ottoboni, Andrea Adami, a castrato, was appointed master of the papal choir in the Sistine Chapel. Between 1709 and 1710, Filippo Juvarra entered the court and enlarged the theatre. Domenico Paradisi and Angelo de Rossi were responsible for the decoration of the palace suites.

Ottoboni supported Arcangelo Corelli, the finest violinist of his generation, at his Monday night concerts called "academies". When Corelli died in 1713, he left his estate, which included some valuable pictures, to the Cardinal, who distributed the sizable funds among Corelli's relations and erected a princely tomb for the musician in the Pantheon. Other protégés of the cardinal were Alessandro Scarlatti, Antonio Vivaldi and Antonio Caldara. As his father Antonio Ottoboni also did, Pietro Ottoboni wrote texts of cantatas and librettos for oratorios, such as for Scarlatti's La Giuditta of 1693. When opera was banned in Rome, performances withdrew to Ottoboni's Cancelleria. His triumphal return to Venice in 1726 was celebrated with musical festivities that included a serenata Andromeda liberata, with arias contributed by various Venetian masters, including Vivaldi.

The young Sicilian architect Giovanni Battista Vaccarini and painters Sebastiano Conca, Sebastiano Ricci and Francesco Trevisani, a resident of the court for almost four decades, also benefited from his patronage. One of his most important commissions was the Seven Sacraments executed in 1712 by Giuseppe Maria Crespi (now in the Museum of Dresden). In 1735 he donated his Roman sculptures and other antiquities to the Capitoline Museums. The last decade of Ottobini's life was his most active as a patron.

Upon the death of Pope Clement XII on 6 February 1740, Ottoboni was considered papabile, but left the conclave with a fever. He died three days later on 23 February 1740. His heirs took advantage of the vacant papacy and removed everything portable from the Cancelleria. There is a full description of the cardinal's paintings, which locates them by room. It presents a clear picture of his extensive acquisitions over a period of fifty years. Listed are almost 530 paintings, some inherited from his great-uncle: the most important painters are mentioned above. Others were Benedetto Luti, Guido Reni, Giovanni Batista Gaulli, Tintoretto, Pusini, Giuseppe Bartolomeo Chiari, Pietro da Cortona, Francesco Albani, Jacopo Bassano, Giovanni Baglione, Giacinto Brandi, Giuseppe Cesari, and Veronese. In Rome, Ottoboni had acquired a taste for Northern European paintings like those by Caspar van Wittel and Gerrit van Honthorst. The Ottoboni possessions were disposed of in four sales, and as a result, dispersed throughout the world. Final settlements of all accounts were made in 1752.

According to Charles Montesquieu, Pietro Ottoboni had between 60 and 70 children. Portraits of his mistresses as saints, like Margarita Pio Zeno of Savoy (1670–1725), decorated his bedroom.

== Debt and dispersal ==
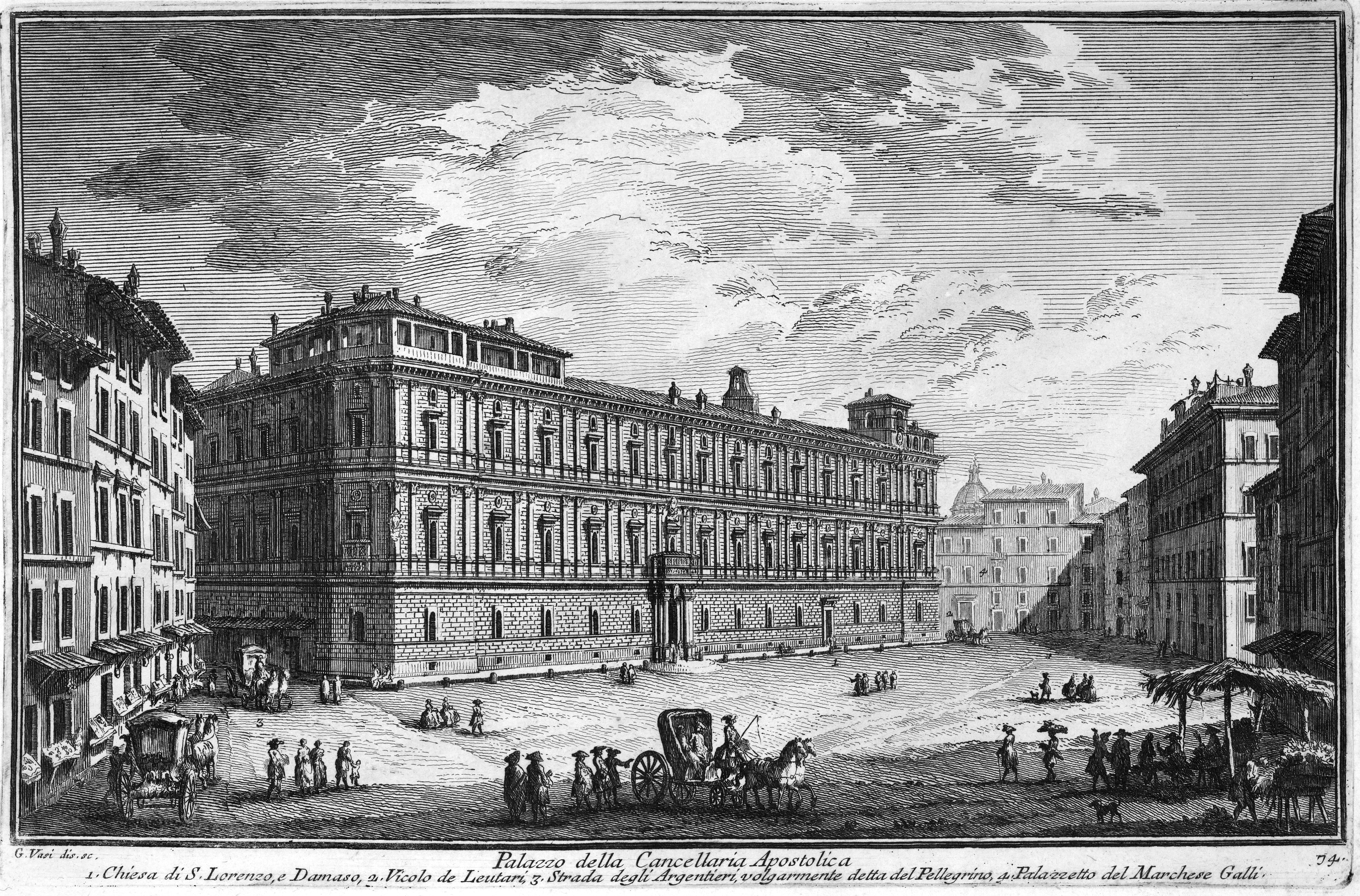
Palazzo della Cancelleria: the 18th-century engraving by Giuseppe Vasi exaggerates the depth of the Piazza della Cancelleria in front of the Palace.

Despite his numerous benefices, and his alliance with the French crown, the expenses of the cardinal were perpetually exceeding his income. Upon his death, his estate was subsequently liquidated to settle his debts.

Ottoboni's music library was dispersed after his death, but the so-called "Manchester Concerto Part-books" have survived with sets of separate parts for 95 compositions, mostly concertos. His manuscript scores came into the possession of Charles Jennens, the librettist for Handel’s Messiah. The diverse contents of the concerto collection suggest that Ottoboni’s musicians acquired and performed music from artistic centres elsewhere (notably Venice and Bologna) as well as works composed in Rome.

Ottoboni was a gifted opera and oratorio librettist and a member of the Academy of Arcadia. Pietro Metastasio, was his godchild.

== See also ==
- Codices Ottoboniani in the Vatican Library

== Sources ==
- Cardinal Pietro Ottoboni (1667-1740) And The Vatican Tomb Of Pope Alexander VIII Edward J. Olszewski (2004) DIANE Art & Art Instruction ISBN 0-87169-252-X
- The Inventory of Paintings of Cardinal Pietro Ottoboni (1667-1740) Edward J. Olszewski (2004) AUS, Series XX Fine Arts, Vol. 36. ISBN 0-8204-6373-6
- Michael Ranft (1769) Leben und Thaten aller in diesem XVIII Jahrhundert gelebten und theils noch lebenden Cardinäle der Römischen Kirche in III Theilen, p. 268-281.
