= Antonio Ottoboni =

Prince assistant to the papal throne and captain general of the Church from 1689 to 1691

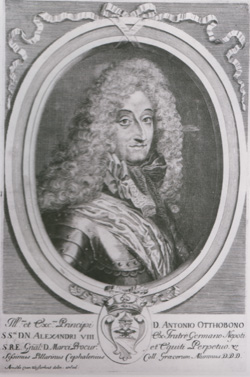
- An engraved painting of Antonio Ottoboni
- Born: 20 June 1646; Venice, Republic of Venice
- Died: 19 February 1720 (aged 73); Rome, Papal States
- Known for: Serving as prince assistant to the papal throne and captain general of the Church (1689–1691)
- Children: 1 (Cardinal Pietro Ottoboni)
- Relatives: Pope Alexander VIII (uncle)
- Family: Ottoboni

Antonio Innocenzo Ottoboni (20 June 1646 – 19 February 1720) was a Venetian nobleman who served as prince assistant to the papal throne and captain general of the Church between 1689 and 1691, under the papacy of his uncle, Alexander VIII. He was the father of Cardinal Pietro Ottoboni.

== Early life and marriage ==
Antonio Innocenzo Ottoboni was born in Venice on 20 June 1646 to Agostino di Marco and Candida Benzio. His family, the Ottoboni, bought the aggregation to the Venetian patriciate two months after Antonio was born. Agostino's brother, Pietro, was a cardinal at the time of Antonio's birth, and would later become Pope Alexander VIII. Antonio had a sister and, after his father's second marriage, two half siblings. According to his uncle Pietro's writings, Antonio grew up without money, abandoned to himself by his father, and was a guest of his other uncle, Marcantonio.

In December 1665, Antonio married Maria di Giovanni Moretti, who gave birth to their only son, Pietro, in 1667.

== Career ==
In 1670, Antonio became castellan of Bergamo. During this time, his uncle's agent described him as being heavily indebted. In 1674, thanks to his uncle Pietro's help, Antonio became podesta of Feltre.

After the death of his other uncle, Marcantonio, in 1672 and of his father in 1673, Antonio accumulated significant wealth. However, he lost much of it gambling. By becoming count of Zara, and appealing to the doge, Antonio escaped his debts. In 1682, Antonio became podesta and captain of Crema. During this time, he received financial help from his uncle Pietro to support himself.

In 1681, Antonio's son was brought to Rome by Antonio's uncle, who took care of his education.

In 1689, Antonio's uncle became pope, under the name Alexander VIII. In Venice, Antonio became knight and procurator of Saint Mark. When he arrived to Rome, he was nominated prince assistant to the papal throne and captain general of the Church. During this time, he was allowed access to large sums of money by his uncle. After the death of his uncle in 1691, Antonio lost his Roman titles. Once he returned to Venice, he was stripped of his Venetian titles, as Venetian noblemen could not accept money from foreign kings.

Ten years later, thanks to help from his son, Cardinal Pietro Ottoboni, Antonio reentered the Venetian political scene. However, In 1709, his son was given a role at the court of Louis XIV, and, as Venetian noblemen were prohibited from openly siding with a king, the Ottoboni family was stripped of their titles, and their properties were confiscated. Antonio was exiled from Venice and found refuge in Rome, where he died on 19 February 1720.

== Writings ==
Antonio wrote many poems, including some written in Venetian. However, most of his poetic writings were not published. In 1712, he published an essay titled "Lettera di un nobile cattolico repubblichista ad un suo figlio, che era presso un suo gran zio fuori della patria, con cui gli dà l’insegnamento di vivere per tutto il corso della sua vita" (A letter from a Catholic, republican nobleman to his son, who was staying with his great-uncle outside the country, in which he offers him guidance on how to live throughout his life), warning his son Pietro of the difficulties of being a new patrizio. He was one of the proponents of the Accademia dei Dodonei.
