= Cavalleggeri =

Cavalleggeri were an inferior category of cavalry during the classic period of feudal cavalry. This included knife-armed cavalry, lancers' pages and mounted crossbowmen. Later, cavalleggeri became a subsidiary arm of the gendarmerie.

In 1498, Louis XII of France gave this name (chevau-léger) to his mounted companies, forming a sort of mounted infantry, and this special body continued until 1570. In this era Henry IV of France formed a company of chevau-légers, well-educated and called ordinance since it was used as the king's guard.

Other Italian states and communal militias created cavalleggeri units. In the Florentine Republic it was established that 500 mounted crossbowmen would be regularly enlisted, with the option of arming 10% of them with lances. These were also known as drappelli and were formed into bands, each of which was made up of 50 cavalleggeri and commanded by a condotiere.

After 1600 this specialist cavalry was more and more streamlined and made more practical in the age of gunpowder. Such units were split up to increase numbers in heavy cavalry units, or turned into such units themselves. The cavalleggeri of this era were armed with carbines or pistols. In 1799, new cavalleggeri/chevau-légers units were created, and under Napoleon these were once again armed with lances.

== Bibliography ==
- Stato Maggiore Esercito - Ufficio Storico. Ezio Cecchini. Tecnologia ed arte militare . 1977, Roma
- Stato Maggiore Esercito - Ufficio Storico. Ezio Cecchini. Le istituzioni militari. 1986, Roma
- Stato Maggiore Esercito - Ufficio Storico. Rodolfo Puletti. L'esercito e i suoi corpi. Sintesi Storica. Volume I. 1971, Roma
- Rodolfo Puletti. Caricat 1973, Capital, Bologna
- Dario Temperino. Storia del Reggimento Cavalleggeri di Lodi (15°). 2001 www.cavalleriaitaliana.it
