= Pope Alexander VIII =

Head of the Catholic Church from 1689 to 1691

- Bishop of Rome
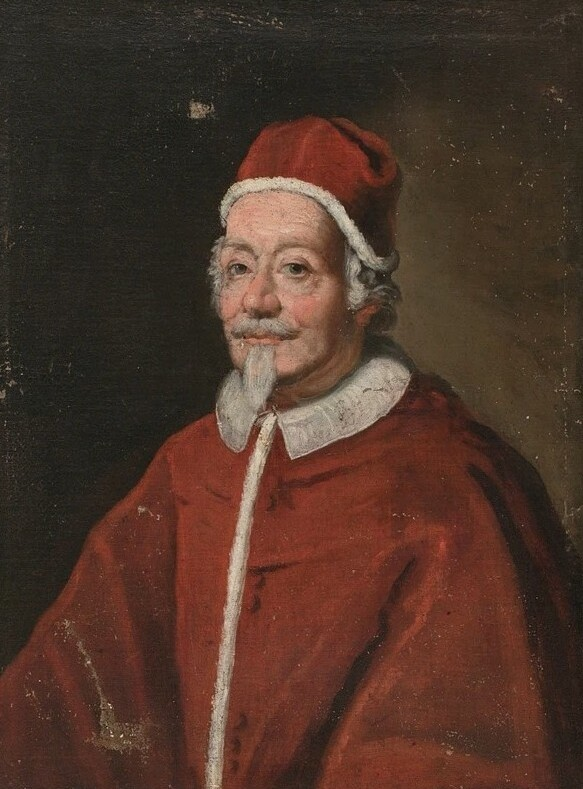
- Portrait, c. 1689–1691
- Church: Catholic Church
- Papacy began: 6 October 1689
- Papacy ended: 1 February 1691
- Predecessor: Innocent XI
- Successor: Innocent XII
- Previous posts: Cardinal-Bishop of Sabina (1681–1683); Cardinal-Bishop of Frascati (1683–1687); Bishop of Brescia (1654–1664); Cardinal-Bishop of Porto e Santa Rufina (1687–1689); Cardinal-Priest of San Salvatore in Lauro (1652–1660); Cardinal-Priest of San Marco (1660–1667); Cardinal-Priest of Santa Maria in Trastevere (1667–1680); Cardinal-Priest of Santa Prassede (1680–1681)

Orders
- Ordination: c. 1630
- Consecration: 27 December 1654 by Marcantonio Bragadin
- Created cardinal: 19 February 1652 by Innocent X

Personal details
- Born: Pietro Vito Ottoboni; 22 April 1610 Republic of Venice
- Died: 1 February 1691 (aged 80) Rome
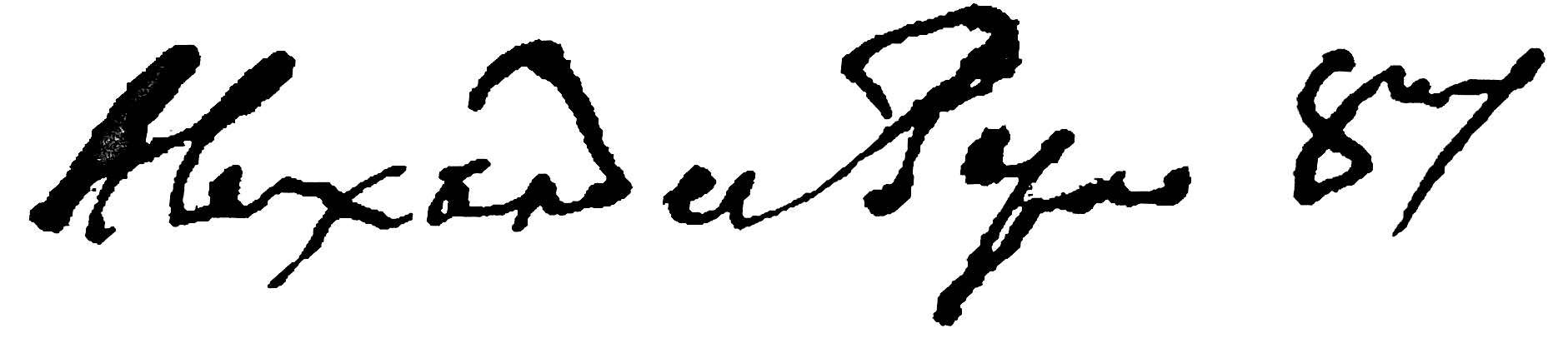
- Signature

- Coat of arms

Pope Alexander VIII (Italian: Alessandro VIII; 22 April 1610 – 1 February 1691), born Pietro Vito Ottoboni, was head of the Catholic Church and leader of the Papal States from 6 October 1689 to his death in February 1691. He is the most recent pope to take the pontifical name "Alexander".

Born in the Republic of Venice, Ottoboni earned a doctorate in canon and civil law from the University of Padua. He was made a cardinalate by Pope Innocent X, and Ottoboni was elected pope at the 1689 conclave, taking the name Alexander VIII. His papacy is known for having overturned many of the policies of his predecessor, Innocent XI. He indulged in nepotism to further enrich his family, which exhausted the papal treasury, later forcing his successor, Innocent XII, to implement austere measures to restore the papal coffers.

Despite his brief papacy, during which little of importance was undertaken, Alexander VIII is known for having condemned the doctrines of the so-called philosophical sin which was being taught in schools run by the Society of Jesus. Also during his papacy, King Louis XIV of France restored Avignon to the Holy See as a territory of the Papal States.

== Biography ==
=== Early life ===
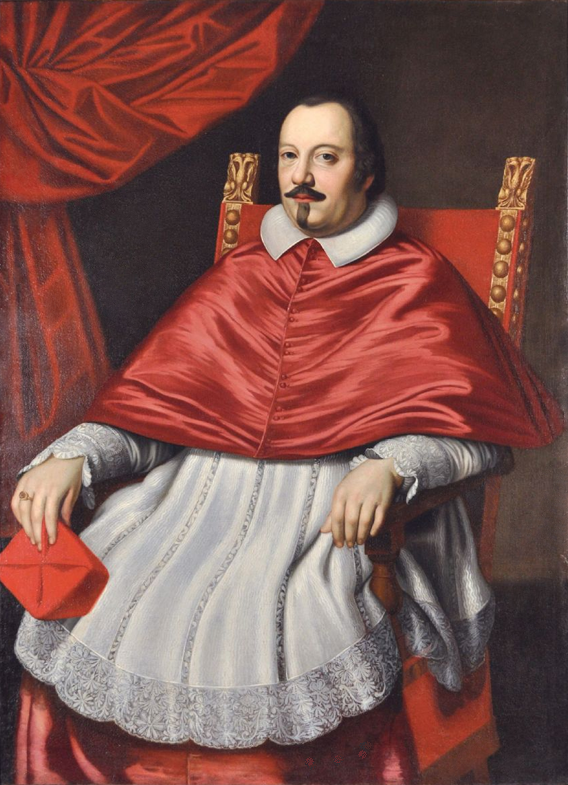
Cardinal Ottoboni before his election

Pietro Vito Ottoboni was born in 1610 of a noble Venetian family, and was the youngest of nine children of Marco Ottoboni (1554–1646), grand chancellor of the Republic of Venice, and wife (1594) Vittoria Tornielli (d. 6 November 1635), and paternal grandson of Marcantonio Ottoboni (d. 30 July 1576) and wife Dianora Besalù, Basalu or Bassalù (d. 1 December 1603). His brothers included Agostino Ottoboni (31 July 1608 - d. 2 August 1673), married firstly to Candida Benci (d. c. 31 December 1647) (parents of Vittoria Ottoboni (b. 1637), married to Luigi Priuli, with issue, and Antonio Ottoboni, married to Maria Moretti, parents of Cardinal Pietro Ottoboni) and married secondly in Venice on 22 April 1649 to Paolina Bernardo (parents of Chiara Ottoboni (b. 27 July 1651), married in 1670 to Francesco Zeno, with issue, and Marco Ottoboni, 1st Duke of Fiano). His sisters included Cristina Ottoboni, married to Giambattista Rubini, with issue, and Andriana Ottoboni, married as his first wife to her second cousin Marcantonio Padavino. The family was invited into the nobility of Venice as a result of the battle of Zonchio (1499) and later met the financial qualifications for nobility in the 17th century after amassing a fortune in the diplomatic service.

His early studies were made with marked brilliance at the University of Padua where, in 1627, he earned a doctorate in canon and civil law. Ottoboni went to Rome during the pontificate of Pope Urban VIII and served as the Referendary of the Apostolic Signatura, and later was the governor of the cities Terni, Rieti, Citta di Castello and Spoleto. He also served as the auditor of the Sacred Roman Rota.

=== Episcopate and cardinalate ===
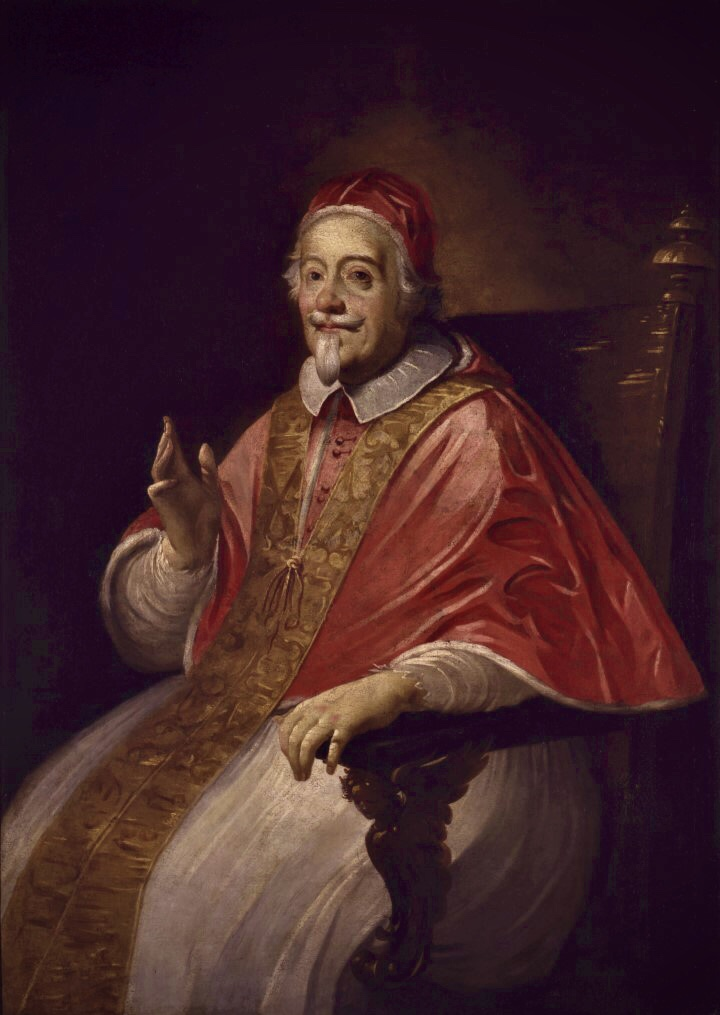
Portrait of Cardinal Pietro Ottoboni by Ludovico Dorigny (before 1689, Museo antoniano, Basilica of Saint Anthony of Padua)

Pope Innocent X appointed him to the cardinalate and in 1652 at the request of the Venetian government and he was made the Cardinal-Priest of San Salvatore in Lauro. He was appointed as Bishop of Brescia in 1654 and later received episcopal consecration in the church of San Marco in Rome. He would spend a quiet decade in his diocese. He opted to be Cardinal-Priest of San Marco in 1660 and resigned as Bishop of Brescia in 1664. Ottoboni also opted to become Cardinal-Priest of Santa Maria in Trastevere in 1677 and later as Cardinal-Priest of Santa Prassede in 1680. He later became the Cardinal-Bishop of Sabina in 1681 and then to Frascati in 1683. His last swap was that of Porto e Santa Rufina in 1687.

Ottoboni was also the Vice-Dean of the College of Cardinals from 1687 to his pontifical election.

== Pontificate ==
=== Papal election ===
Papal styles of Pope Alexander VIII
- Reference style: His Holiness
- Spoken style: Your Holiness
- Religious style: Holy Father
- Posthumous style: None

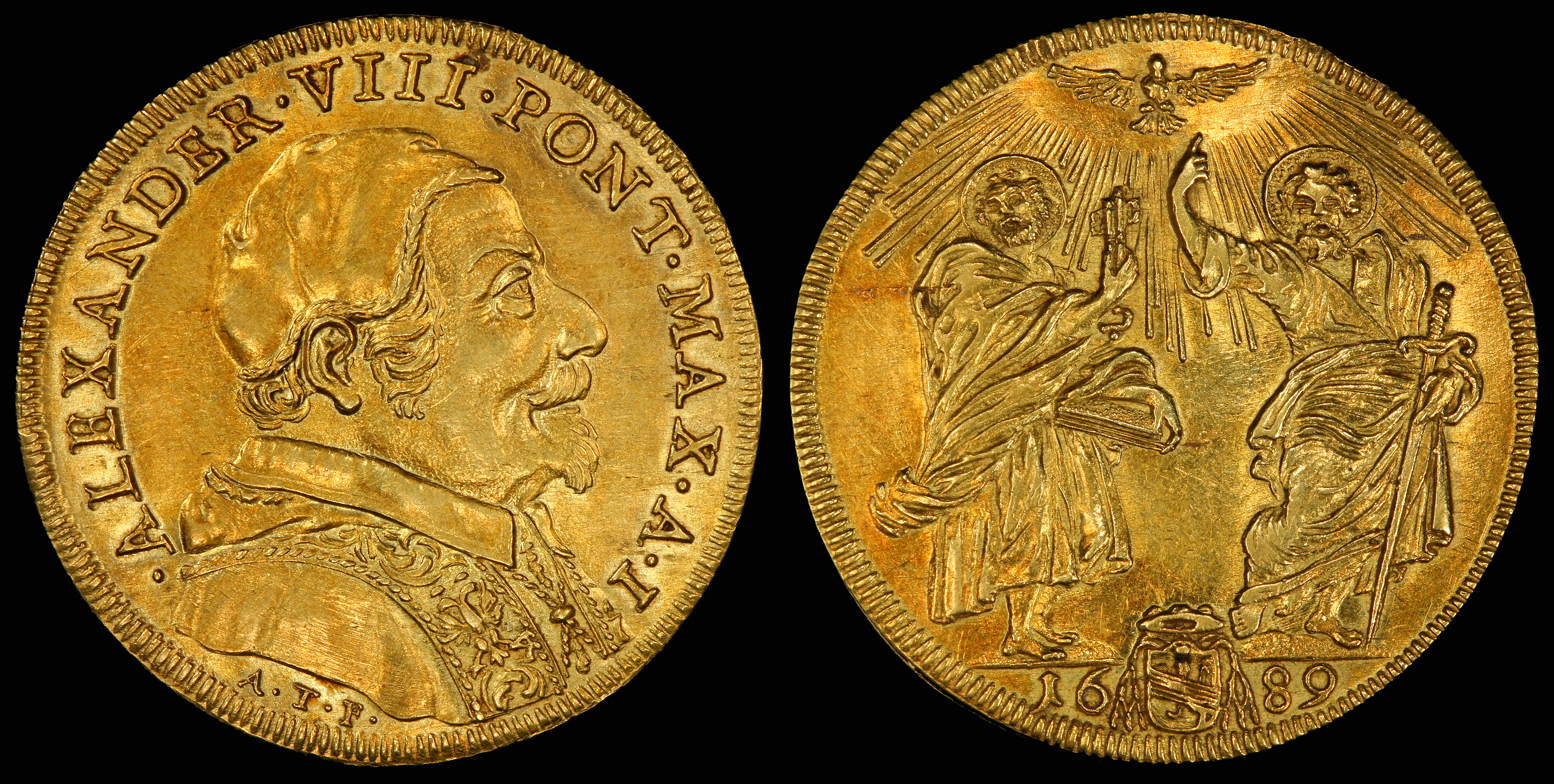
Pope Alexander VIII depicted on a gold quadruple Italian scudo from 1689. Saints Peter and Paul on the reverse. Engraved by Antonio Travani, a goldsmith and medalist in Rome.

The ambassador of King Louis XIV (1643–1715) succeeded in procuring his election on 6 October 1689, as the successor to Pope Innocent XI (1676–89); nevertheless, after months of negotiation Alexander VIII finally condemned the declaration made in 1682 by the French clergy concerning the liberties of the Gallican church.

He chose the pontifical name of "Alexander VIII" in gratitude to Cardinal Flavio Chigi, the nephew of Pope Alexander VII, who also had helped support his candidacy. Ottoboni was crowned as pontiff on 16 October 1689 by the protodeacon Cardinal Francesco Maidalchini and took possession of the Basilica of Saint John Lateran on 28 October 1689.

Originally, the allies of Cardinal Flavio Chigi proposed a Venetian in the form of Gregorio Barbarigo rather than their true choice of Ottoboni, hence, a case of misdirection to test whether or not the electors would consider the appointment of a Venetian to the papal throne. Though Barbarigo seemed to garner an exceptional number of votes which highlighted that a Venetian pontiff was indeed a tantalizing opportunity, Barbarigo could not garner any additional votes beyond what he already had accrued. However, many in the camp that wanted continuity with the policies of Innocent XI had caught on to the deception, which only served to create indignation within the conclave. However, since Chigi and his faction had not directly voted for Barbarigo in order to maintain the deception, the Ottoboni candidacy could go ahead and could remain unmarred since Chigi and his faction lied that they were waiting for the arrival of the French cardinals and did not wish to commit to any particular candidate. Though the Venetians indicated their support for Ottoboni, the republic had also managed to secure the support of Madrid and Vienna through their ambassadors, while Cardinal Medici made certain that the Imperial and Spanish factions would also support Ottoboni's candidacy. The determination to elect Ottoboni came conclusively when Ottoboni himself indicated that he was strongly in favor of reconciliation with the French, something that greatly appeased Louis XIV who had been in a more conciliatory mood of late.

Despite his age, Alexander VIII was said to be an able diplomat. During his brief pontificate, he managed to undo most of his predecessor's work. Money saved by Innocent XI was given to the Ottoboni family, and to a cardinal he said: "I have no time to lose; for me the day is almost done!" He held a profound compassion and attentiveness for the poor, which was often squandered and abused by his relatives whom he enriched.

Alexander VIII was almost an octogenarian when elected to the papacy, which lasted only sixteen months, during which time little of importance was done. Louis XIV, whose political situation was now critical, profited by the peaceful dispositions of the new pope, restored Avignon to him, and renounced the long-abused right of asylum for the French Embassy.

=== Reforms ===
On 29 November 1690, the pontiff established that no more than ten thousand ducats could be spent on the funeral of a pope. That same year, he also forbade that any furnishings of the conclave could not be stripped to be sold for profit.

On 30 March 1690, the pope established and confirmed the rights of the neophytes in Southeast Asia in the papal brief Animarum salutes.

Reversing the economic policies of his immediate predecessor, Alexander VIII attempted to reduce the tax burden on the populace as a means of providing financial assistance to the more disadvantaged peoples. However, this backfired due to the pope's focus on large-scale charity initiatives and his focus on the Great Turkish War against the Ottoman Empire, which quickly depleted papal funds which Innocent XI had been very careful to grow and safeguard.

=== Finance ===
Charities on a large scale and unbounded nepotism exhausted the papal treasury, reversing the policies of his predecessor. Among the various nominations, his 22-year-old grandnephew Pietro was made cardinal and vice-chancellor of the Church, nephew Marco, son of his brother Agostino, was made inspector of naval fortifications and Duke of Fiano, and nephew Antonio, another of Agostino's children, was made general of the church. His nephew Giambattista Rubini was made Cardinal Secretary of State and bishop of Vicenza. Out of compassion for the poor of the impoverished Papal States, he sought to help them by reducing taxes. But this same generous nature led him to bestow on his relations the riches they were eager to accumulate; on their behalf, and to the discredit of his pontificate, he revived sinecure offices which had been suppressed by Innocent XI. He bought the books and manuscripts of Queen Christina of Sweden for the Vatican Library. Alexander VIII assisted his native Venice by generous subsidies in the war against the Turks, as well as sending seven galleys and 2,000 infantry for the campaign in Albania. In 1690 he condemned the doctrines of the so-called philosophical sin, taught in the Jesuit schools. He also held three consistories that saw 14 new cardinals elevated.

=== Foreign policy ===
==== Venice ====
A Venetian himself, Alexander VIII largely supported the Republic of Venice in its military campaign against the Ottoman Empire for control of Peloponnese in Greece and the Aegean Sea, donating enough food to fill seven galleys while also sending infantry for their campaign in Albania.

==== France ====
Condemning the precepts of the Gallican proposals which had been ratified in 1682, the pope attempted to try and mend the despairing relationship between the Holy See and the French which had been largely strained by his predecessor. Despite this, the proposals were revoked in 1693 only after Alexander VIII had died, in exchange for papal recognition of the right of the crown to administer to vacant dioceses. At the time as Louis XIV found his own political situation to be precarious, the monarch profited from the pope's peaceful dispositions while Louis XIV decided to renounce the long-abused right of asylum for the French embassy.

=== Beatifications and canonizations ===
Alexander VIII confirmed the cultus of Kinga of Poland on 11 June 1690 which served as the beatification. On 16 October 1690, he canonized several saints: Ss. Pascal Baylon, Lorenzo Giustiniani, John of Sahagun, John of God and John of Capistrano.

=== Consistories ===
The pope created 14 cardinals in three consistories and elevated individuals such as his grandnephew Pietro Ottoboni in a restoration of nepotism that had not been seen in his predecessor's reign. Among those whom he named was Gianfrancesco Albani, the future Pope Clement XI.

The pontiff also named Toussaint de Forbin-Janson to the cardinalate in 1690 despite his immediate predecessor having firmly refused to do so. While Innocent XI had refused to name him as a cardinal due to Forbin-Janson's support for the Gallican proposals in 1682, Alexander VIII opted to name him a cardinal in an attempt to smooth over tense relations with King Louis XIV who had been on relatively poor terms with Innocent XI. As a further overture to the French monarch, Alexander VIII also named two more French cardinals, a move that largely irked Leopold I, Holy Roman Emperor and saw the emperor withdraw his ambassador to the Holy See. Moreover, the pontiff was less concerned with the emperor's actions primarily because the emperor had primarily been indifferent to defending against the Ottoman Empire in favor of hostility with the French.

== Death and burial ==
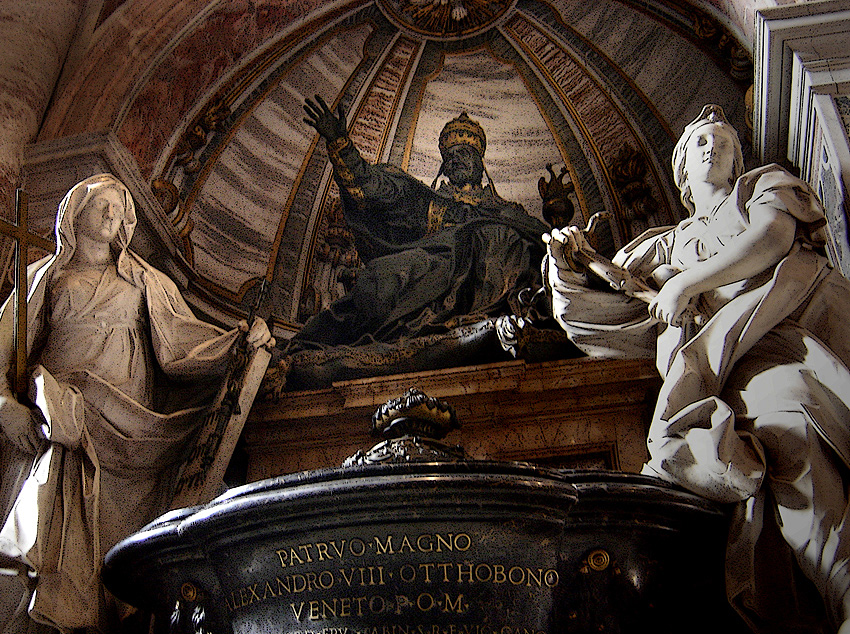
The tomb of Alexander VIII in Saint Peter's Basilica

On 16 October 1690, the day that he celebrated a canonization Mass, it was noticed that Alexander VIII appeared to look relatively sluggish and hence seemed like he had fallen ill. While it was hypothesized that he may have had a minor stroke, his doctors suggested that the pope rest but were unsure of what exactly had caused the pope to fall ill. On 20 January 1691, Cardinal Forbin Janson informed King Louis XIV that the pope was seriously ill, and on 22 January, that his condition had dramatically deteriorated and that his nephew was pessimistic about his uncle's chances. On 27 January, it was reported that gangrene had set in while Alexander VIII met with twelve cardinals on 30 January. Alexander VIII died at 4:00pm on 1 February 1691 while a plague from Naples had spread to Rome, infecting the pope and hastening his death.

His grandiose tomb in Saint Peter's was commissioned by his grandnephew, Cardinal Pietro Ottoboni, and designed by Count Arrigo di San Martino. The bas-relief at the base and the flanking figures (1704) were sculpted by Angelo de' Rossi, while the bronze statue of the pope was cast by Giuseppe Bertosi.

== Episcopal succession ==
Pope Alexander VIII was the principal consecrator of:

- Giuseppe Zandemaria, Bishop of Piacenza (1655);
- Carlo Cardinal Bonelli, Titular Archbishop of Corinthus (1656);
- Nicolaus Carpenia, Archbishop of Durrës (1657);
- Daniele Giustiniani, Bishop of Bergamo (1664);
- Bartolomeo Gradenigo, Bishop of Concordia (1667);
- Pietro Leoni (bishop), Bishop of Ceneda (1667);
- Sebastiano Pisani (iuniore), Bishop of Verona (1668); and
- Raimondo del Pozzo, Bishop of Vieste (1668).

== See also ==
- Cardinals created by Alexander VIII

Catholic Church titles
Preceded by Innocent XI	Pope; 6 October 1689 – 1 February 1691	Succeeded by Innocent XII
