= Toussaint de Forbin-Janson =

French cardinal and bishop (1631-1713)

- Cardinal-Priest of San Callisto
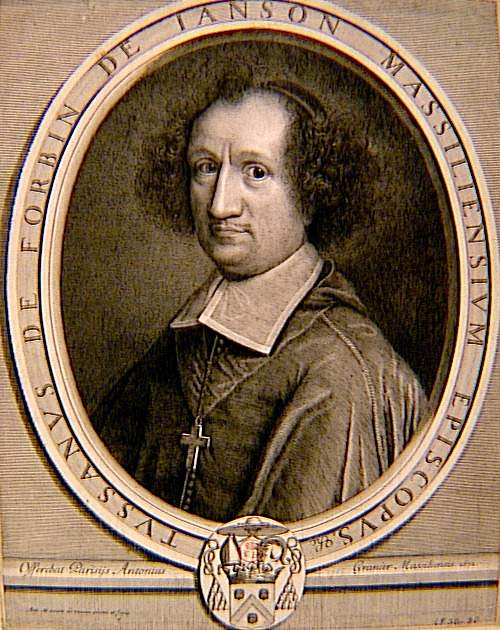
- Church: Catholic Church
- In office: 28 September 1693 – 24 March 1713
- Predecessor: Nicolò Acciaioli
- Successor: Gianantonio Davia
- Other post: Bishop of Beauvais (1679-1713)
- Previous posts: Cardinal-Priest of Sant'Agnese fuori le mura (1690-1693); Bishop of Marseille (1668-1679); Bishop of Digne (1664-1668); Titular Bishop of Philadelphia in Arabia (1655-1664); Coadjutor Bishop of Digne (1655-1664)

Orders
- Consecration: 14 May 1656 by Étienne de Puget
- Created cardinal: 13 February 1690 by Pope Alexander VIII

Personal details
- Born: 1 October 1631 Mane, Provence, Kingdom of France
- Died: 24 March 1713 (aged 81)

Toussaint de Forbin-Janson also known simply as Cardinal de Janson (1 October 1631, Mane – 24 March 1713) was a French Catholic Cardinal and Bishop of Beauvais.

== Early life ==
As a boy, Janson joined the Knights of Malta and then the army of the Kingdom of France (as was the custom). But he left the army in his late teens and went to study letters.

== Ecclesiastic career ==
Soon after, he was ordained and at the age of 21 was appointed coadjutor bishop in support of his uncle, the Bishop of Digne. He was appointed titular bishop of Filadelfia in 1655 and was forced to leave the Knights of Malta. He succeeded his uncle as Bishop of Digne in 1664 and in 1668 he transferred to become Bishop of Marseille. In 1679 he became Bishop of Beauvais.

In 1673, King Louis XIV sent Janson to Tuscany to repair his relationship with his cousin, Marguerite Louise d'Orléans, wife of Cosimo III de' Medici, Grand Duke of Tuscany. Thereafter he was appointed Ambassador Extraordinary of France to Poland and then to the Netherlands.

Janson announced his support for the Gallican proposals at the 1682 Assembly in Paris. As a result, Pope Innocent XI refused to elevate Janson to the cardinalate. Innocent XI died seven years later in 1689.

== Cardinalate ==
In February 1690, the newly elected Pope Alexander VIII elevated Janson to cardinal and appointed him cardinal-priest of the church of Sant'Agnese fuori le mura in July of that year. Upon his elevation Janson announced that he would be formally adopting the name Cardinal de Janson to differentiate himself from his brother, the Marquis du Forbin-Janson.

A number of cardinals still resented the position Janson had taken at the Paris assembly, but the Pope insisted Janson had been forgiven for past errors.

== Episcopal succession ==
Episcopal succession of Toussaint de Forbin-Janson

While bishop, he was the principal consecrator of:

- John Baptist Sleyne, Bishop of Cork and Cloyne (1693);
- François de Mailly, Archbishop of Arles (1698);
- Pier Secondo Radicati de Cocconato, Bishop of Casale Monferrato (1701);

and the principal co-consecrator of:

- Ignace Cotolendi, Titular Bishop of Metellopolis and Vicar Apostolic of Nanking (1660);
- Gilbert de Vény d'Arbouze, Bishop of Clermont (1664); and
- Jules Mascaron, Bishop of Tulle (1672).
