= War of Urbino =

Part of the Italian Wars

- Part of the Italian Wars
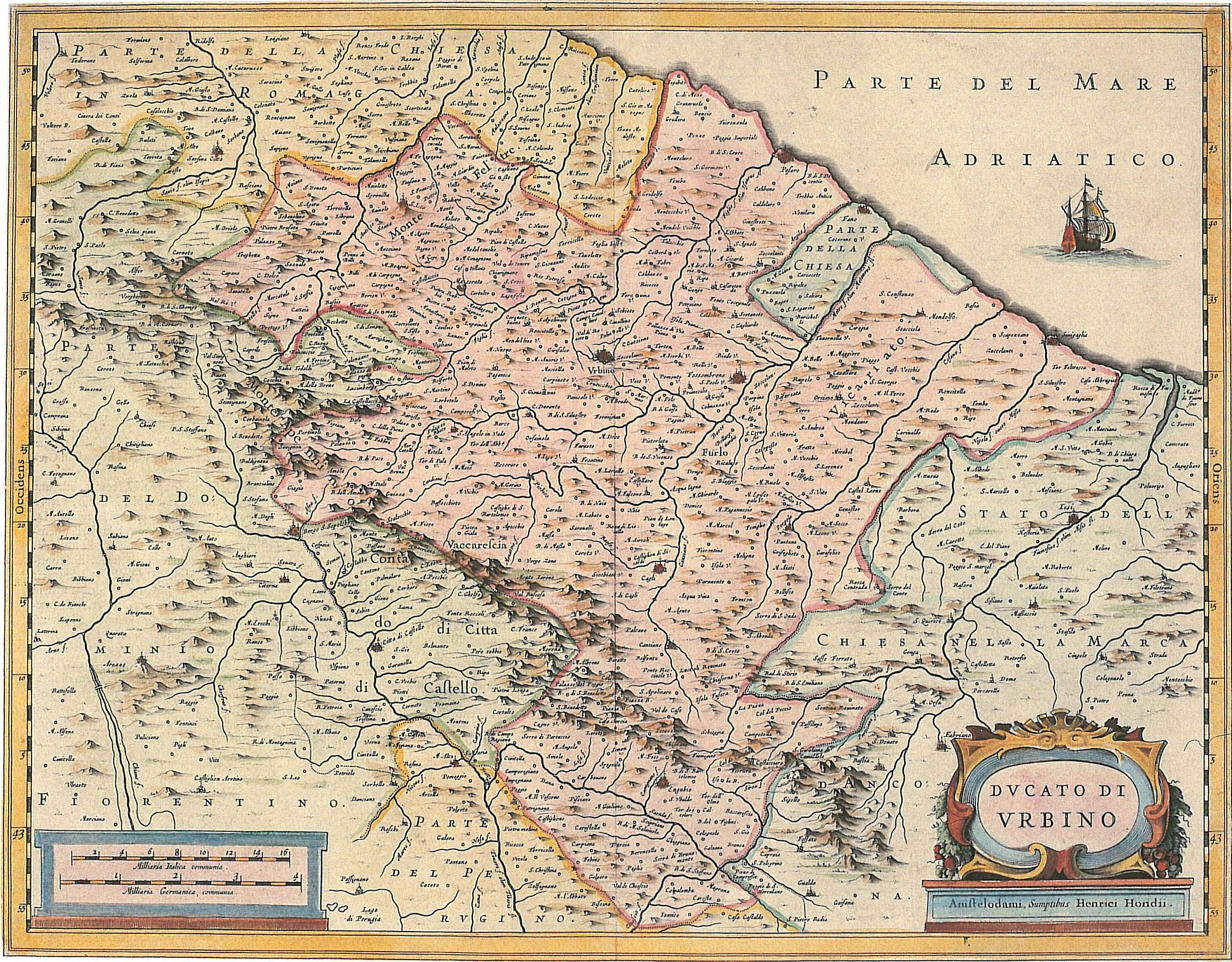
Date	January–September 1517
Location	Duchy of Urbino, Italy
Result	Negotiated peace

Belligerents
Duchy of Urbino; Republic of Venice	Papal States

Commanders and leaders
Francesco Maria I; Federico Gonzaga	Pope Leo X; Francesco del Monte; Lorenzo de' Medici; Renzo da Ceri

The War of Urbino (January–September 1517) was a secondary episode of the Italian Wars.

The conflict ensued after the end of the War of the League of Cambrai (1508–16), when Francesco Maria I della Rovere decided to take advantage of the situation to recover the Duchy of Urbino, from which he had been ousted in the previous year by troops of the Papal States.

In early 1517 he presented himself under the walls of Verona to hire the troops which had besieged the city, now to be returned to the Republic of Venice. Della Rovere set off with an army of some 5,000 infantry and 1,000 horses which he entrusted to Federico Gonzaga, lord of Bozzolo, reaching the walls of Urbino on 23 January 1517.

He defeated the Papal condottiero Francesco del Monte and entered the city hailed by the population.

Pope Leo X reacted by hastily hiring an army of 10,000 troops under Lorenzo II de' Medici, Renzo da Ceri, Giulio Vitelli, and Guido Rangoni and sent it against Urbino. Lorenzo was wounded by a bullet from an arquebus on April 4 during the siege of the Mondolfo castle, and returned to Tuscany. He was replaced by Cardinal Bibbiena. Cardinal Bibbiena, however, was unable to control the troops and suffered a defeat at Monte Imperiale with significant losses. Ultimately, he was forced to retreat to Pesaro.

The war was, however, ended by the lack of money of Francesco Maria della Rovere, who soon found himself unable to pay the troops hired at Verona. After some unfruitful ravages in Tuscany and Umbria, he began to seek for a diplomatic settlement with the pope. In September they signed a treaty by which della Rovere was relieved of all ecclesiastical censures and was left free to retreat to Mantua with all his artillery, as well as the rich library collected in Urbino by the former duke Federico III da Montefeltro.

The war saw the first appearance of Giovanni dalle Bande Nere on the battlefield.
