= Cardinals created by Gregory XI =

Catholic appointments from 1371 to 1375

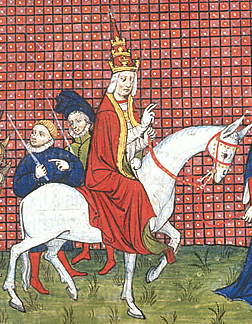
Pope Gregory XI (r. 1370–1378)

Pope Gregory XI (r. 1370–1378) created 21 cardinals in two consistories held during his pontificate. Two of the cardinals that he named became antipopes Clement VII and Benedict XIII.

== 30 May 1371 ==
- Pedro Gómez Barroso the younger
- Jean de Cros
- Bertrand de Cosnac Can. Reg. O.S.A.
- Bertrand Lagier O.F.M.
- Robert de Genève
- Guillaume de Chanac O.S.B.
- Jean Lefèvre
- Jean de la Tour O.S.B. Clun.
- Giacomo Orsini
- Pierre Flandrin
- Guillaume Noellet
- Pierre de la Vergne

== 20 December 1375 ==
- Pierre de la Jugié O.S.B. Clun.
- Simone Brossano
- Hugues de Montrelais
- Jean de Bussière O.Cist.
- Guy de Malsec
- Jean de la Grange O.S.B.
- Pierre de Sortenac
- Gérard du Puy O.S.B. Clun.
- Pedro Martínez de Luna y Pérez de Gotor

== Sources ==
- Miranda, Salvador. "Consistories for the creation of Cardinals 14th Century (1303-1404): Gregory XI (1370-1378)". The Cardinals of the Holy Roman Church. Florida International University. OCLC 53276621.
