= List of cardinal-nephews =

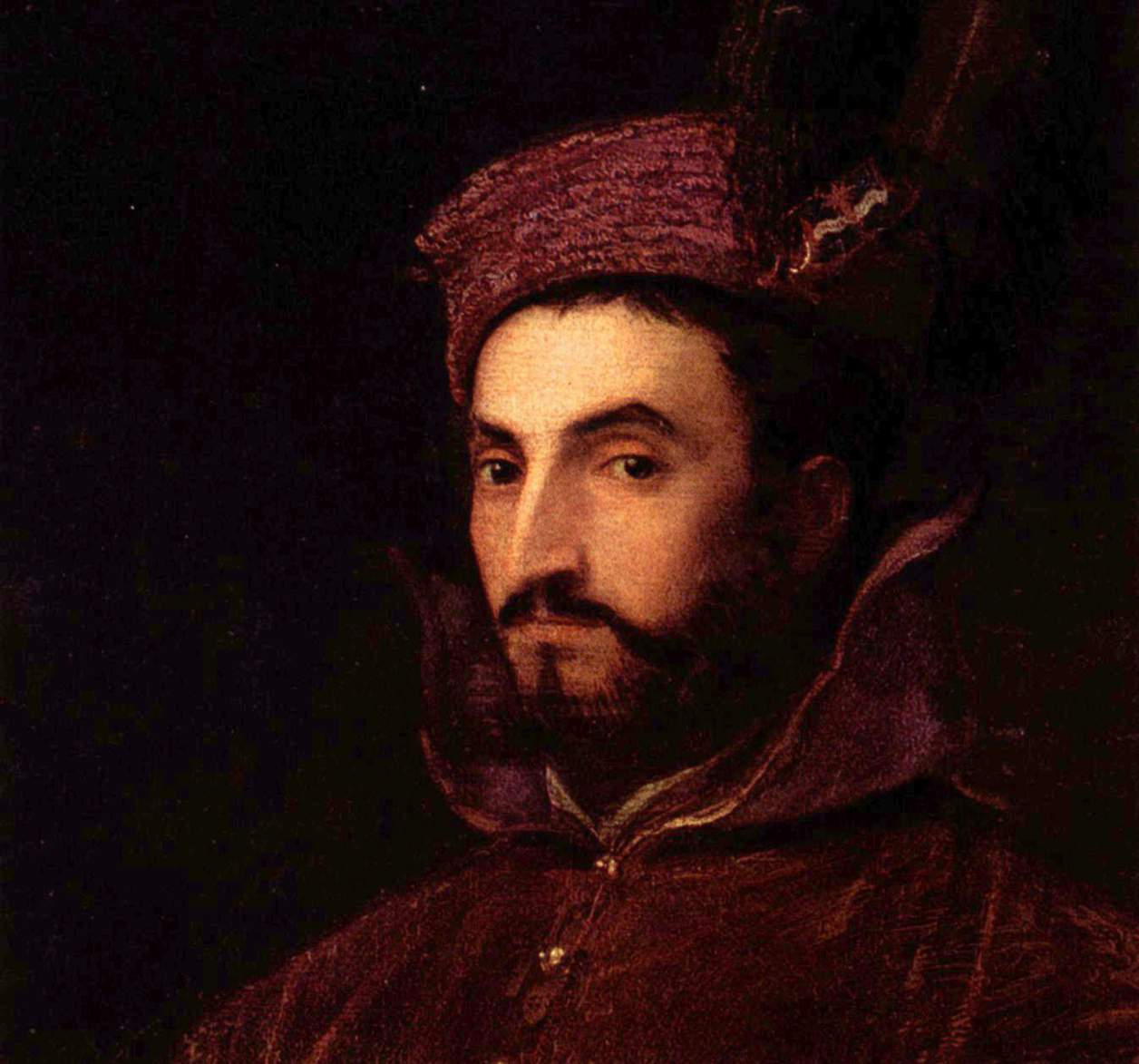
Ippolito de' Medici, a cardinal-nephew of Pope Clement VII and illegitimate son of Giuliano di Lorenzo de' Medici

A cardinal-nephew is a cardinal elevated by a pope who was his uncle, or more generally, his relative. The practice of creating cardinal-nephews originated in the Middle Ages, and reached its apex during the 16th and 17th centuries. From the Avignon Papacy (1309–1377) until Pope Innocent XII's anti-nepotism bull, Romanum decet pontificem (1692), nearly every pope who appointed cardinals appointed at least one relative to the College of Cardinals, (Note: Until Pope Innocent XII, the only exceptions were popes who did not appoint the cardinals at all (Pope Pius III, Pope Marcellus II, Pope Urban VII, Pope Leo XI) and Pope Adrian VI (who appointed only one cardinal).) including every Renaissance-era pope.

Although nephews were the most common relation to be elevated to the College, other family members included sons and grandsons (whether legitimate, illegitimate, or adopted), brothers, grandnephews, cousins and even uncles. At least 15, and possibly as many as 19 cardinal-nephews were later elected pope (Gregory IX, Alexander IV, Adrian V, Gregory XI, Boniface IX, Innocent VII, Eugene IV, Paul II, Alexander VI, Pius III, Julius II, Leo X, Clement VII, Benedict XIII, and Pius VII, perhaps also John XIX, Benedict IX, if they were really promoted cardinals, as well as Innocent III and Benedict XII, if in fact they were related to their elevators). One became antipope (John XXIII), and two or three were canonized (Charles Borromeo, Guarinus of Palestrina, and perhaps Anselm of Lucca, if in fact he was really elected cardinal). (Note: Miranda, citing older authors such as Alphonsus Ciacconius, says that Pope Anastasius IV (Corrado della Suburra) was probably a nephew of his elevator Honorius II; however, modern scholars are in agreement that Corrado was created by Paschalis II, and deny or do not mention his relationship with Honorius II.)

Similarly created cardinals include cardinal-nephews of antipopes and papal relatives made cardinals by other popes.

== Notes on symbols ==
Because statements concerning the familial ties of popes and cardinals prior to the 14th century are often of much later origin, some sources regard their factual accuracy as dubious. Thus, individuals are marked with:

- , when the existence of the familial relationship is disputed, or
- , when their promotion to the cardinalate is disputed.

Occupants of the curial office of the Cardinal Nephew are denoted with †.

== 11th century ==
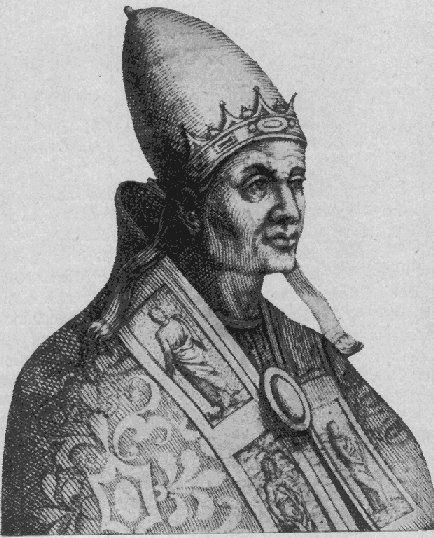
Pope Benedict VIII elevated his cousin, brother, and nephew to the cardinalate.

Elevating pope	Cardinal-nephew	Date of elevation	Relationship	Notes
Benedict VIII (1012–1024)	Lotario (or Loctarius), seniore	circa 1015	Cousin	
Benedict VIII (1012–1024)	Giovanni	, Unknown	Brother	Future Pope John XIX
Benedict VIII (1012–1024)	Teofilatto	, Unknown	Nephew (Note: Nephew to both Benedict VIII and John XIX)	Future Pope Benedict IX
John XIX (1024–1032)	Pietro	1024	Cousin	
Benedict IX (1032–1044, 1045, 1047–1048)	Giovanni	before April 1044	Nephew	
Alexander II (1061–1073)	St. Anselm of Lucca	Circa 1062	Brother or nephew	(Note: Several modern sources do not mention his cardinalate.)
Urban II (1088–1099)	Odon de Châtillon	Circa 1095	Nephew	(Note: The source for the statement that Odon was nephew of Urban II is Ferdinando Ughelli (1594–1670), considered reliable by Klewitz because he was able to verify Ughelli's other statements concerning that cardinal. Date of his promotion is given according to Hüls, who does not mention this relationship.)

== 12th century ==
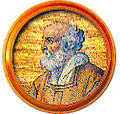
Pope John XIX, the first cardinal-nephew elected pope

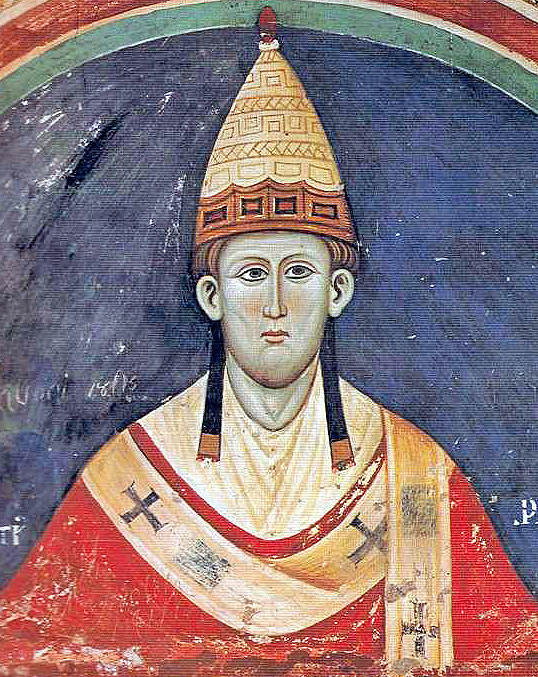
Pope Innocent III created an unprecedented four cardinal-nephews.

Elevating pope	Cardinal-nephew	Date of elevation	Relationship	Notes
Callixtus II (1119–1124)	Etienne de Bar	1120	Nephew	(Note: Etienne de Bar, who was nephew of Callixtus II and bishop of Metz 1120–1163, is commonly identified with cardinal Stephanus of S. Maria Cosmedin, who appears in the papal bulls between 1120–1128, but Ganzer considers it erroneous that de Bar was a cardinal. Hüls also reject this identification and adds that cardinal Stephanus of S. Maria in Cosmedin was probably brother of cardinal Giovanni of Crema.)
Innocent II (1130–1143)	Gregorio Papareschi	1134/1137	Nephew	(Note: Brixius and Zenker say nothing of his origins, including any relationship to Innocent II)
Innocent II (1130–1143)	Pietro Papareschi	17 September 1143	Brother	(Note: His relationship with Innocent II is not attested in the contemporary sources and nothing is known about his life except his first name (Petrus) and cardinalatial title (bishop of Albano).)
Lucius II (1144–1145)	Ubaldo	19 May 1144	Cousin or nephew	(Note: Others deny his relationship with Lucius II.)
Lucius II (1144–1145)	St. Guarinus of Palestrina	22 December 1144	Relative	(Note: There is a consensus that he was related to Lucius II, with the exception of Maleczek, who says that this is not attested in the contemporary sources.)
Adrian IV (1154–1159)	Boso Breakspeare	21 December 1156	Nephew	
Lucius III (1181–1185)	Uberto Allucingoli	Circa 1182	Nephew	(Note: Several sources doubt his promotion to the cardinalate indicating that he is confused with Cardinal Uberto Crivelli, future Pope Urban III, since they both are listed as cardinals of the title of S. Lorenzo in Damaso at the same time (1182–1185). Cardella affirms his cardinalate, but raises the possibility of confusion with Uberto Crivelli.)
Lucius III (1181–1185)	Gerardo	18 December 1182	Nephew	(Note: Both Maleczek and Miranda say that although many sources consider him a kinsman of Lucius III, this relationship is not proven.)
Clement III (1187–1191)	Lotario de' Conti	22 September 1190	Unknown	Future Pope Innocent III (Note: The tradition of identifying Innocent III as nephew of Clement III may result from an onomastic confusion. Maleczek does not mention a relationship.)
Clement III (1187–1191)	Niccolò Scolari	22 September 1190	Nephew	(Note: In older historiography, he is listed as Niccolò Boboni, nephew of Celestine III, created by this pope in 1191, but Kartusch and Maleczek cite two contemporary documents in which pope Celestine III explicitly calls him nephew of his predecessor Clement III.)
Celestine III (1191–1198)	Bobo	20 February 1193	Relative	
Celestine III (1191–1198)	Giovanni di San Paolo	20 February 1193	Nephew	(Note: Maleczek says that the theory that Giovanni di San Paolo was nephew of Celestine III is based on the very uncertain identification of the future cardinal with a papal subdeacon who served as legate in France ca. 1191 and is attested as nephew of Celestine III; therefore, the status of Giovanni di San Paolo as cardinal-nephew remains uncertain.)
Innocent III (1198–1216)	Ugolino dei Conti di Segni	19 December 1198	Cousin	Future Pope Gregory IX
Innocent III (1198–1216)	Giovanni dei Conti di Segni	3 June 1200	Cousin	
Innocent III (1198–1216)	Ottaviano dei Conti di Segni	27 May 1206	Cousin	
Innocent III (1198–1216)	Stefano Conti	5 March 1216	Unknown	

== 13th century ==
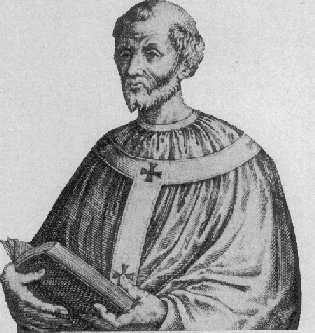
Pope Alexander IV, a cardinal-nephew of Gregory IX, himself a cardinal-nephew of Innocent III, who was a cardinal-nephew of Clement III

Elevating pope	Cardinal-nephew	Date of elevation	Relationship	Notes
Gregory IX (1227–1241)	Rinaldo Conti	18 September 1227	Unknown	Future Pope Alexander IV (Note: More recent genealogical research has cast the doubts on the tradition identifying him as nephew of Gregory IX. Maleczek indicates that he was "probably" a relative of Gregory IX.)
Gregory IX (1227–1241)	Niccolò dei Conti di Segni	December 1228	Nephew	(Note: Miranda adds that his promotion to the cardinalate is disputed. Paravicini Bagliani says that he was never promoted to the cardinalate.)
Gregory IX (1227–1241)	Riccardo Annibaldeschi di Molaria	1238	Unknown	
Innocent IV (1243–1254)	Guglielmo Fieschi	28 May 1244	Nephew	
Innocent IV (1243–1254)	Ottobono Fieschi	December 1251	Nephew	Future Pope Adrian V
Urban IV (1261–1264)	Anchero Pantaleone	22 May 1262	Nephew	
Gregory X (1271–1276)	Vicedomino de Vicedominis	3 June 1273	Unknown	It is a widely disseminated misconception that he was elected but died before proclamation.
Gregory X (1271–1276)	Giovanni Visconti	1275	Unknown	(Note: Miranda adds that his promotion is dubious. Eubel explicitly denies that he was ever a cardinal.)
Nicholas III (1277–1280)	Latino Malabranca Orsini	12 March 1278	Nephew	
Nicholas III (1277–1280)	Giordano Orsini	12 March 1278	Brother	
Honorius IV (1285–1287)	Giovanni Boccamazza	22 December 1285	Relative	
Nicholas IV (1288–1292)	Pietro Colonna	16 May 1288	Relative	(Note: Gihon and Miranda do not mention this relationship.)
Boniface VIII (1294–1303)	Benedetto II Caetani	between 23 January and 13 May 1295	Nephew	
Boniface VIII (1294–1303)	Giacomo Tomasi Caetani (Iacopo Tommasi)	17 December 1295	Unknown	
Boniface VIII (1294–1303)	Francesco Caetani	17 December 1295	Unknown	
Boniface VIII (1294–1303)	Leonardo Patrasso	2 March 1300	Uncle	

== 14th century ==
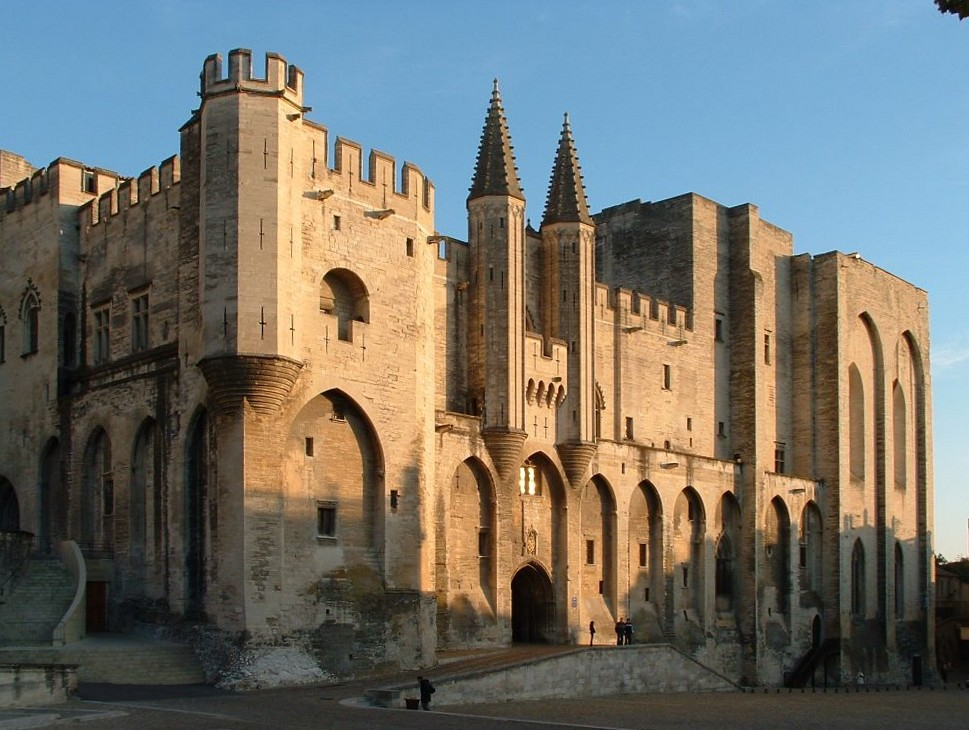
The Avignon Papacy (1309–1377) produced an unprecedented number of cardinal-nephews.

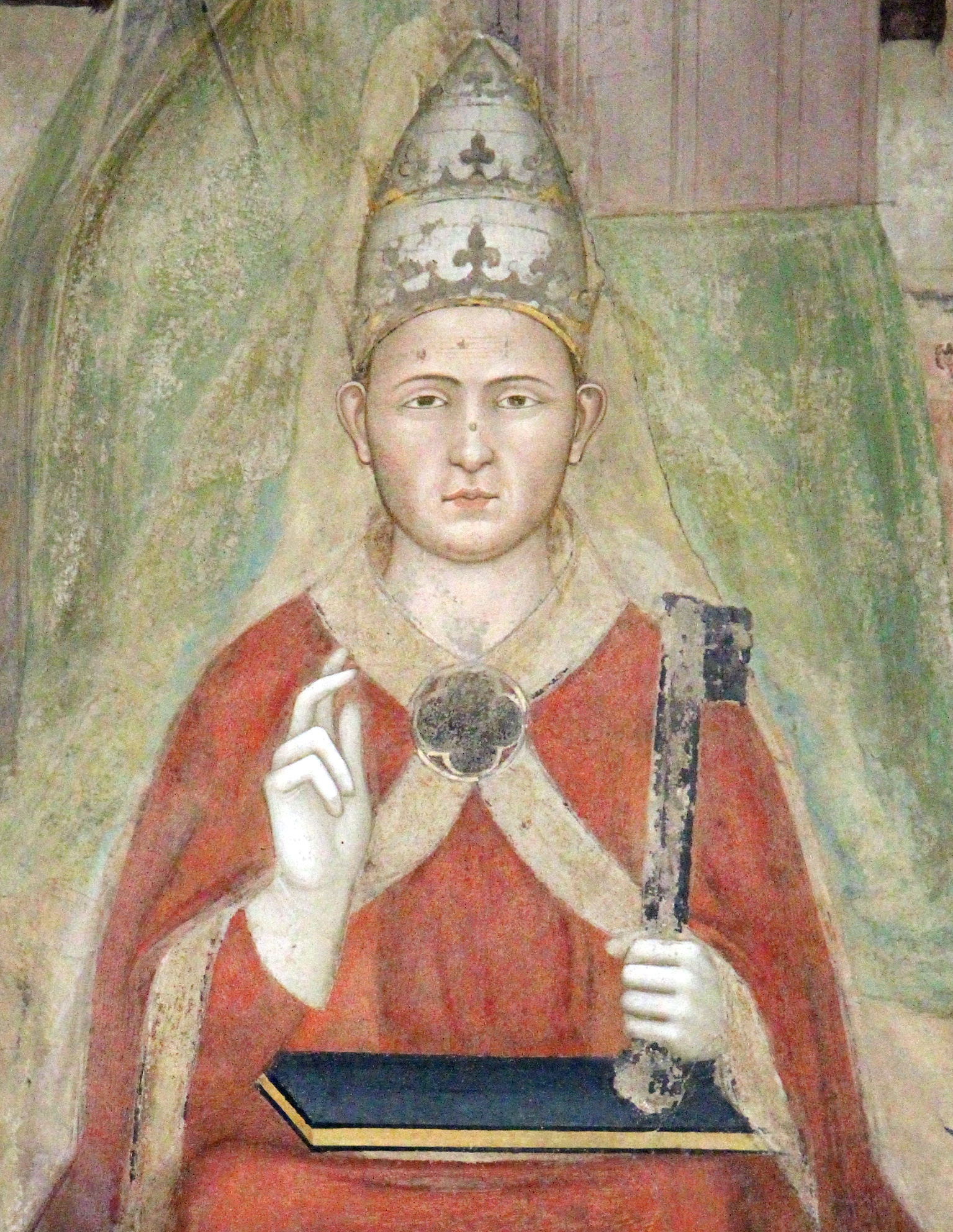
Pope Clement V, the first Avignon Pope, created an unprecedented four or five cardinal-nephews on the same day.

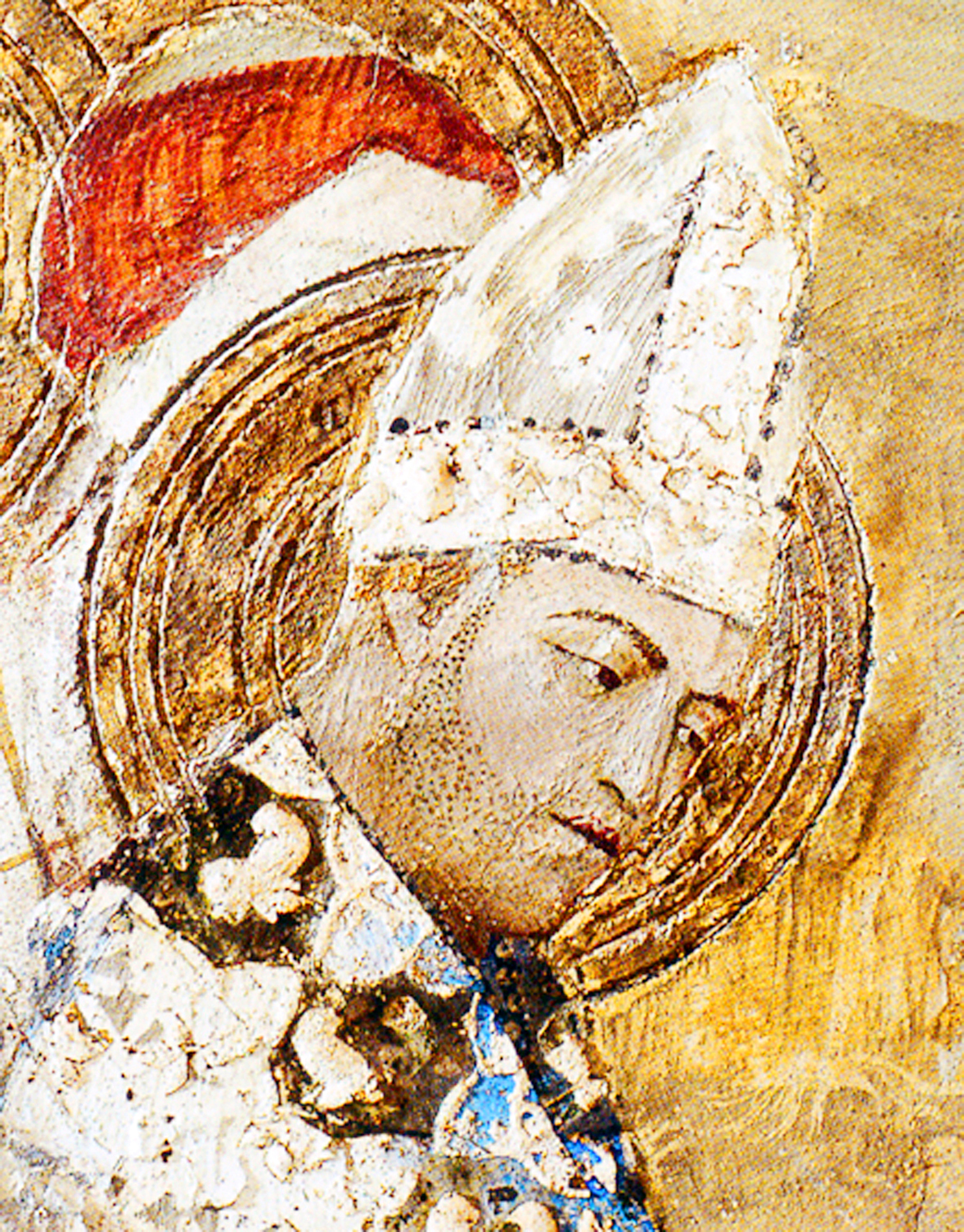
Pope Clement VI created more cardinal-nephews than any other pontiff.

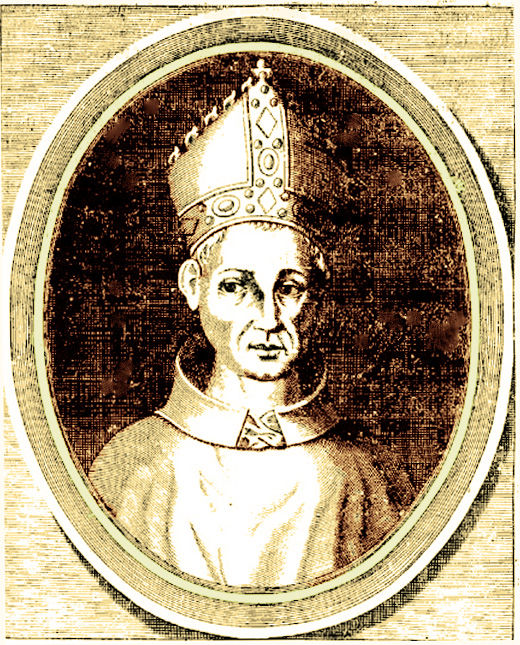
Jean de Murat de Cros

Elevating pope	Cardinal-nephew	Date of elevation	Relationship	Notes
Clement V (1305–1314)	Berengar Fredol the Elder	15 December 1305	Nephew, son of Guillaume de Frédol	
Clement V (1305–1314)	Arnaud Frangier de Chanteloup	15 December 1305	Close relative, possible nephew	
Clement V (1305–1314)	Arnaud de Pellegrue	15 December 1305	Relative, possible nephew	
Clement V (1305–1314)	Raymond de Got	15 December 1305	Nephew, son of Arnaud Garcie de Got	
Clement V (1305–1314)	Guillaume Arrufat	15 December 1305	Relative, possible nephew	
Clement V (1305–1314)	Raymond Guillaume des Forges	19 December 1310	Nephew, son of Marquise de Got	
Clement V (1305–1314)	Bernard Jarre (or Garve)	19 December 1310	Relative	
Clement V (1305–1314)	Arnaud d'Aux	23 December 1312	Relative	
Clement V (1305–1314)	Berengar Fredol the Younger	23 December 1312	Grandnephew	
John XXII (1316–1334)	Jacques de Via	17 December (or 18), 1316	Nephew, son of Marie Duese	
John XXII (1316–1334)	Gauscelin Jean d'Euse	17 December (or 18), 1316	Relative	
John XXII (1316–1334)	Bertrand du Pouget	17 December (or 18), 1316	Relative, possible nephew	
John XXII (1316–1334)	Arnaud de Via	20 June 1317	Nephew, son of Marie Duese	
John XXII (1316–1334)	Raymond Le Roux	19 December (or 20), 1320	Close relative, possible nephew	
John XXII (1316–1334)	Jacques Fournier	18 December 1327	Unknown relative	Future Pope Benedict XII)
John XXII (1316–1334)	Imbert Dupuis	18 December 1327	Relative, possible nephew	
Benedict XII (1334–1342)	Guillaume Court	18 December 1338	Relative, mother's side	
Clement VI (1342–1352)
Clement VI (1342–1352)	Aymeric de Chalus	20 September 1342	Cousin	
Clement VI (1342–1352)	Hugues Roger	20 September 1342	Brother	
Clement VI (1342–1352)	Adhémar Robert	20 September 1342	Cousin or nephew	
Clement VI (1342–1352)	Gérard Lagarde (or Domar)	20 September 1342	Cousin	
Clement VI (1342–1352)	Bernard de la Tour	20 September 1342	Nephew	
Clement VI (1342–1352)	Guillaume de la Jugié (Guillaume II Roger)	20 September 1342	Nephew, son of Guillaumette Rogier	
Clement VI (1342–1352)	Nicolas de Besse	19 May 1344	Nephew, son of Dauphine Roger	
Clement VI (1342–1352)	Pierre-Roger de Beaufort	28 May (or 29), 1348	Nephew	Future Pope Gregory XI
Clement VI (1342–1352)	Raymond de Canillac	17 December 1350	Nephew	
Clement VI (1342–1352)	Guillaume d'Aigrefeuille, seniore	17 December 1350	Cousin	
Clement VI (1342–1352)	Pierre du Cros	17 December 1350	Nephew or cousin	
Innocent VI (1352–1362)	Andouin Aubert	15 February 1353	Nephew, son of Guy Aubert	
Innocent VI (1352–1362)	Pierre de Salvete Monteruc	23 December 1356	Nephew of mother's side	
Innocent VI (1352–1362)	Etienne Aubert, iuniore	17 September 1361	Grandnephew	
Urban V (1362–1370)	Angelic de Grimoard	18 September 1366	Brother	
Urban V (1362–1370)	Pierre d'Estaing	7 June 1370	Relative	
Gregory XI (1370–1378)	Jean de Murat de Cros	30 May 1371	Nephew or cousin	
Gregory XI (1370–1378)	Jean de la Tour	30 May 1371	Brother-in-law of niece	
Gregory XI (1370–1378)	Pierre de la Jugié (or Jugée)	20 December 1375	Cousin	
Gregory XI (1370–1378)	Gui de Maillesec	20 December 1375	Nephew on mother's side	
Gregory XI (1370–1378)	Gérard du Puy	20 December 1375	Cousin or nephew	
Urban VI (1378–1389)	Francesco Moricotti Prignani	18 September 1378	Nephew	
Urban VI (1378–1389)	Filippo Carafa della Serra	18 September 1378	Relative	
Urban VI (1378–1389)	Francesco Renzio	21 December 1381	Distant relative	
Urban VI (1378–1389)	Pietro Tomacelli	21 December 1381	Distant relative	Future Pope Boniface IX
Urban VI (1378–1389)	Tommaso Orsini	ca.1383	Relative	
Urban VI (1378–1389)	Rinaldo Brancaccio	17 December 1384	Relative	
Urban VI (1378–1389)	Marino Bulcani	17 December 1384	Distant relative, nephew of cardinal Francesco Renzio	
Boniface IX (1389–1404)	Enrico Minutoli	18 December 1389	Distant relative	
Boniface IX (1389–1404)	Cosimo Migliorati	18 December 1389	Distant relative	Future Pope Innocent VII (1404–1406)
Boniface IX (1389–1404)	Baldassare Cossa	27 February 1402	Relative	Future Antipope John XXIII

== 15th century ==
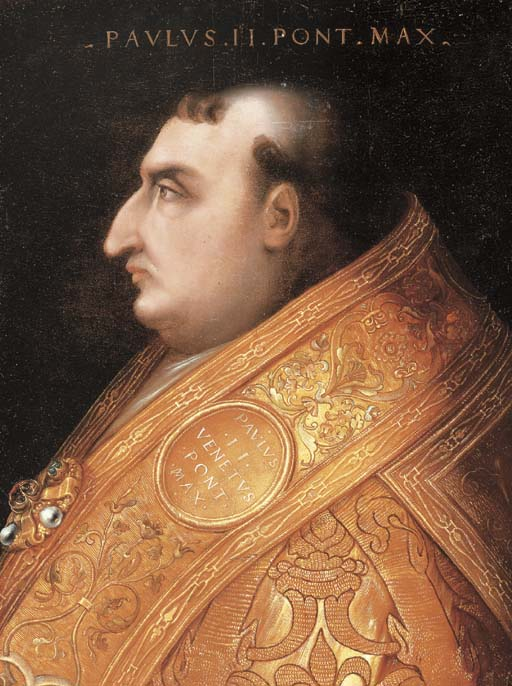
Paul II, cardinal-nephew of Eugene IV, who was cardinal-nephew of Gregory XII

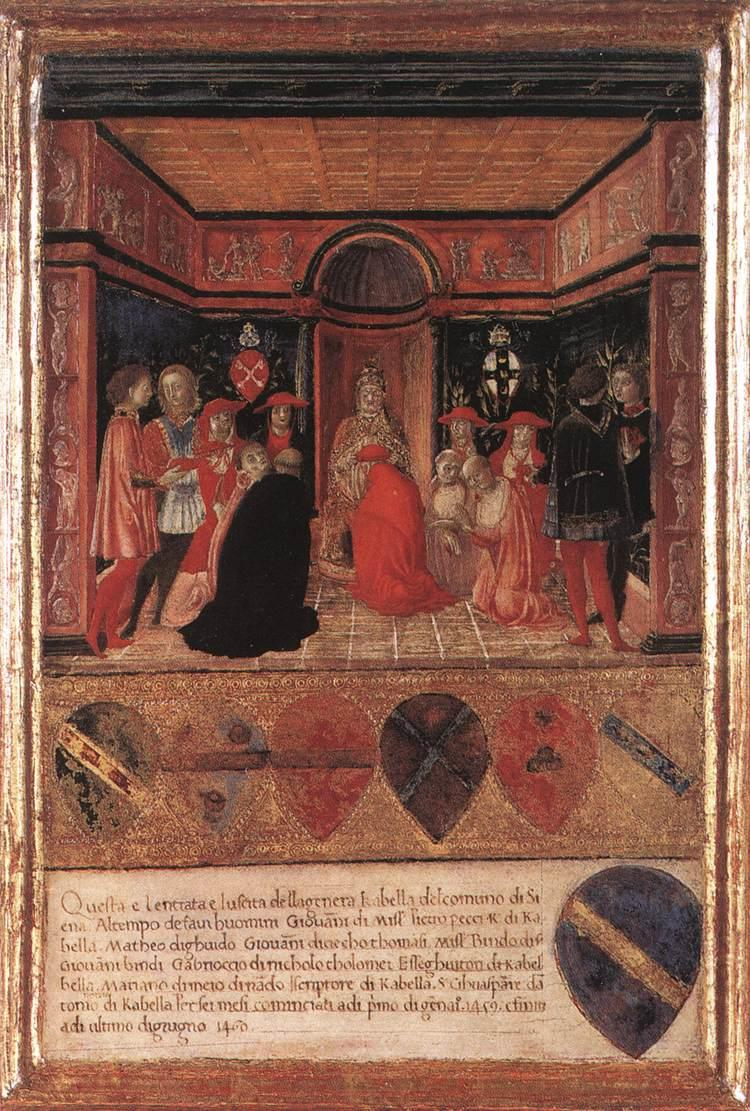
Pope Pius II names his nephew Francesco Piccolomini (future Pope Pius III) cardinal.

Elevating pope	Cardinal-nephew	Date of elevation	Relationship	Notes
Innocent VII (1404–1406)	Giovanni Migliorati	12 June 1405	Nephew	
Gregory XII (1406–1415)	Antonio Correr	9 May 1408	Nephew, son of Filippo Correr	
Gregory XII (1406–1415)	Gabriele Condulmer	9 May 1408	Nephew, son of Beriola Correr	Future Pope Eugene IV
Gregory XII (1406–1415)	Angelo Barbarigo	19 September 1408	Nephew, son of Caterina Correr	
Martin V (1417–1431)	Prospero Colonna	24 May 1426 published 8 November 1430	Nephew, son of Lorenzo Onofrio Colonna	
Eugene IV (1431–1447)	Francesco Condulmer	19 September 1431	Nephew	
Eugene IV (1431–1447)	Pietro Barbo	1 July 1440	Nephew, son of Polissena Condulmer	Future Pope Paul II
Nicholas V (1447–1455)	Filippo Calandrini	20 December 1448	Half-brother	
Callixtus III (1455–1458)	Luis Juan del Mila y Borja	20 February 1456 published 17 September 1456	Nephew	
Callixtus III (1455–1458)	Rodrigo Borja	20 February 1456 published 17 September 1456	Nephew	Future Pope Alexander VI
Pius II (1458–1464)	Francesco Piccolomini	5 March 1460	Nephew	Future Pope Pius III
Pius II (1458–1464)	Niccolò Fortiguerra	5 March 1460	Relative on mother's side	
Pius II (1458–1464)	Giacomo Ammannati-Piccolomini	18 December 1461	Adopted	
Paul II (1464–1471)	Marco Barbo	18 September 1467	Unknown	
Paul II (1464–1471)	Giovanni Battista Zeno	21 November 1468	Unknown	
Paul II (1464–1471)	Giovanni Michiel	21 November 1468	Unknown	
Sixtus IV (1471–1484)	Pietro Riario	16 December 1471	Unknown	
Sixtus IV (1471–1484)	Giuliano della Rovere	16 December 1471	Unknown	Future Pope Julius II
Sixtus IV (1471–1484)	Girolamo Basso della Rovere	10 December 1477	Unknown	
Sixtus IV (1471–1484)	Raffaele Riario	10 December 1477	Unknown	
Sixtus IV (1471–1484)	Cristoforo della Rovere	10 December 1477	Unknown	
Sixtus IV (1471–1484)	Domenico della Rovere	10 February 1478	Unknown	
Innocent VIII (1484–1492)	Lorenzo Cybo de Mari	9 March 1489	Unknown	
Innocent VIII (1484–1492)	Giovanni de' Medici	9 March 1489	Relative	Future Pope Leo X
Innocent VIII (1484–1492)	Pantaleone Cybo	9 March 1489; Never published	Nephew	
Innocent VIII (1484–1492)	Niccolò Cybo	9 March 1489; Never published	Nephew	
Alexander VI (1492–1503)	Juan de Borja Lanzol de Romaní, el mayor	31 August 1492	Son of cousin	
Alexander VI (1492–1503)	Cesare Borgia	20 September 1493	Son	Resigned 18 August 1498
Alexander VI (1492–1503)	Giuliano Cesarini, iuniore	20 September 1493	Brother-in-law of daughter, Gerolama Borgia	
Alexander VI (1492–1503)	Juan de Borja Lanzol de Romaní, el menor	19 February 1496	Grandnephew	
Alexander VI (1492–1503)	Amanieu d'Albret	20 March 1500	Brother-in-law of Cesare Borgia	
Alexander VI (1492–1503)	Pedro Luis de Borja Lanzol de Romaní	20 March 1500	Grandnephew	
Alexander VI (1492–1503)	Francisco de Borja	28 September 1500	Disputed relationship	
Alexander VI (1492–1503)	Juan de Vera	28 September 1500	Relative	
Alexander VI (1492–1503)	Juan Castellar y de Borja	31 May 1503	Cousin of Juan de Borja Lanzol de Romaní, el mayor	
Alexander VI (1492–1503)	Francisco Lloris y de Borja	31 May 1503	Grandnephew	

== 16th century ==
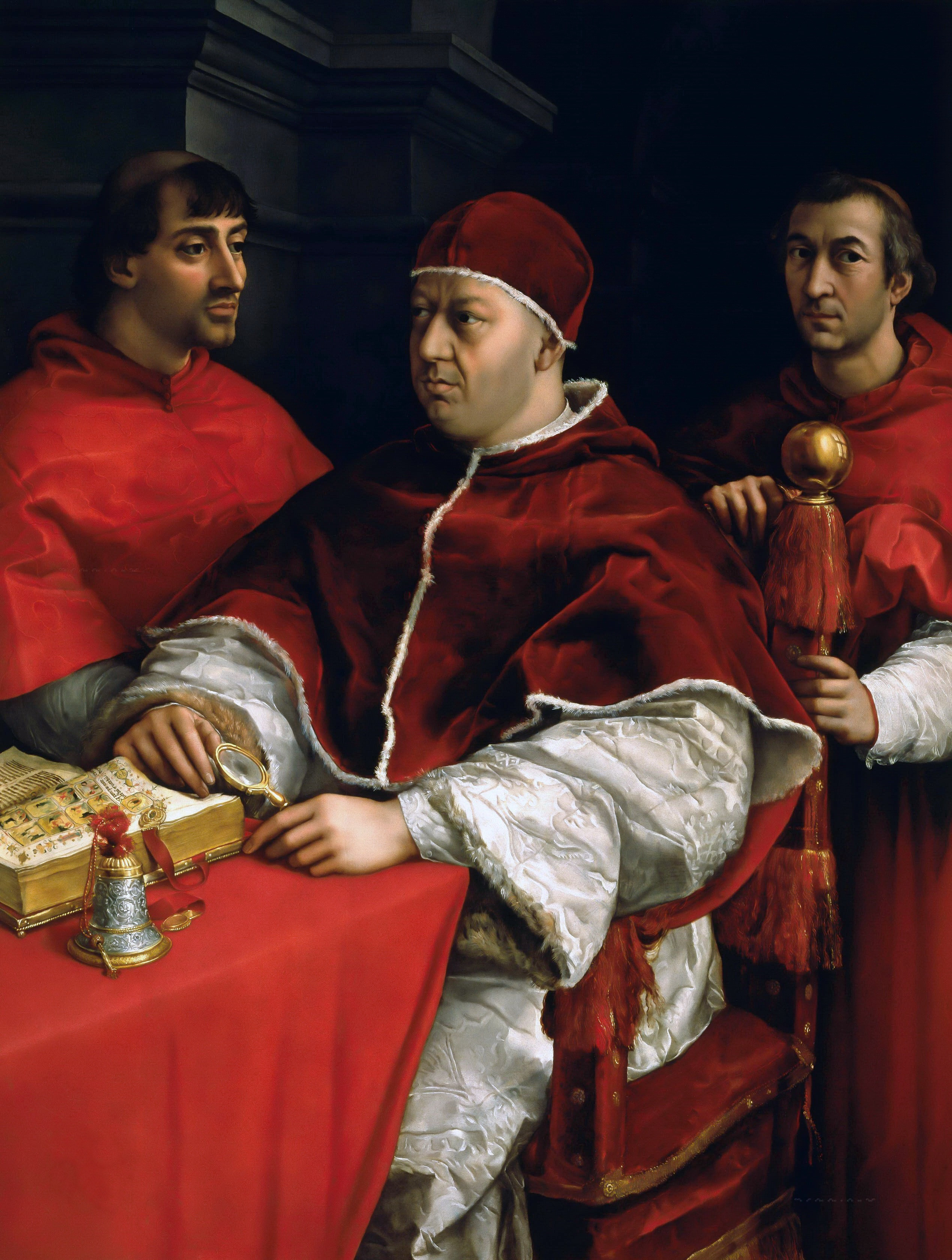
Pope Leo X with his cousins Giulio de' Medici (left, future Pope Clement VII) and Luigi de' Rossi (right), whom he appointed as cardinals

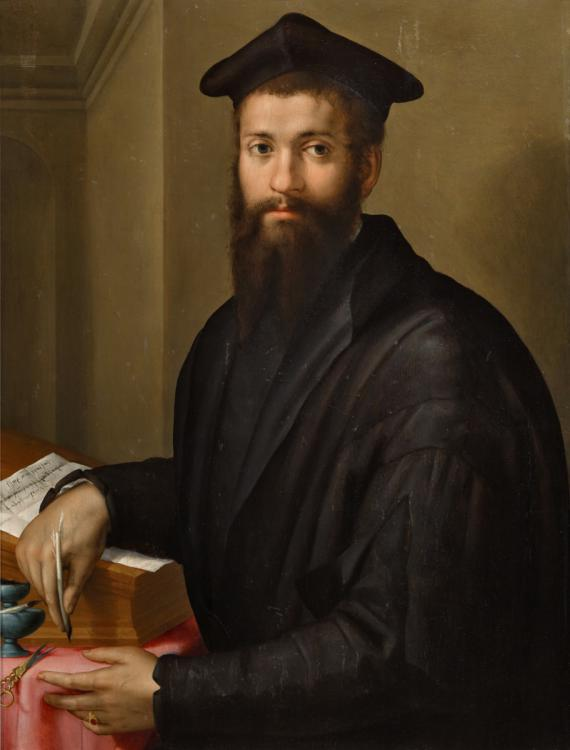
Giovanni Salviati

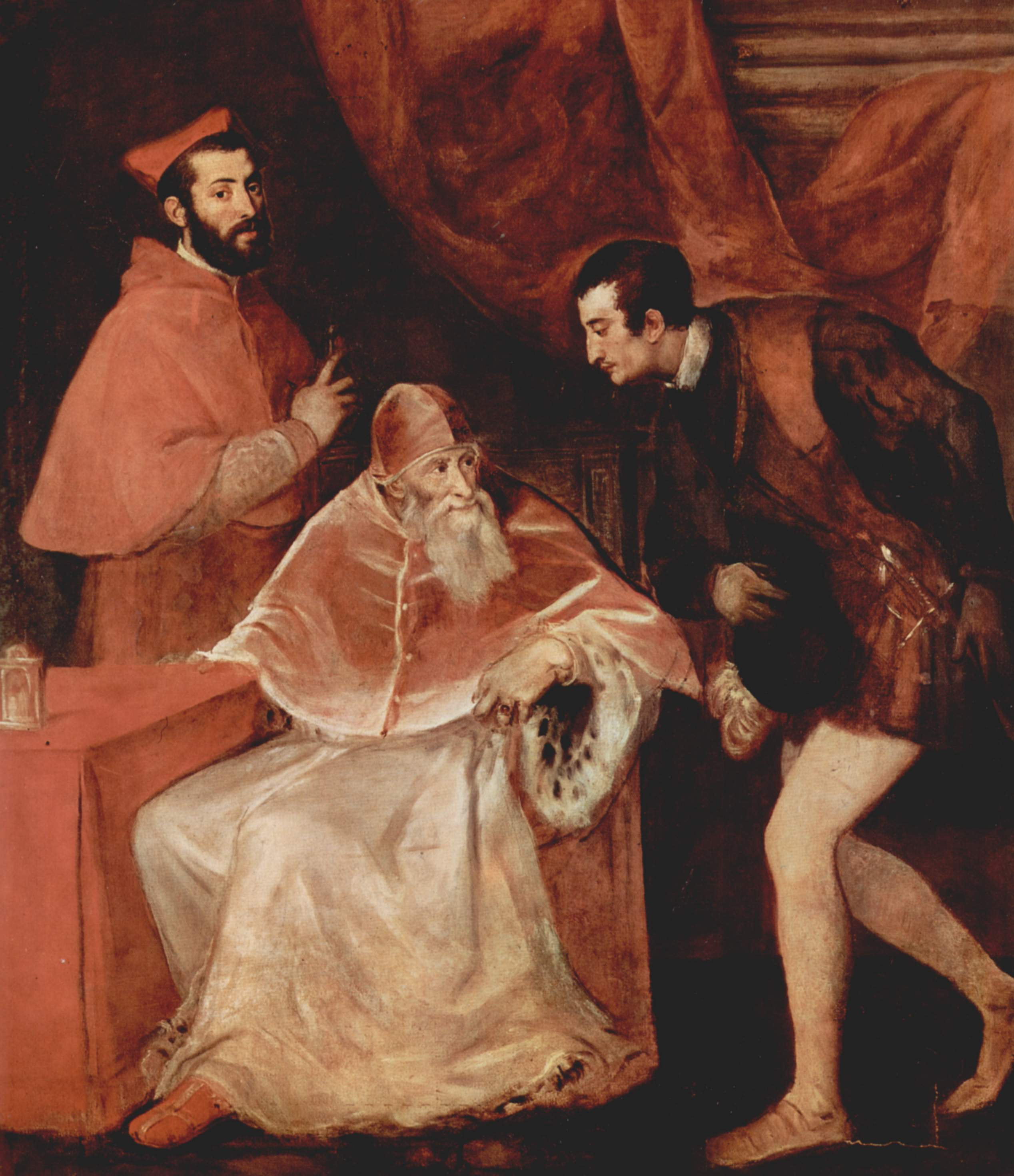
Pope Paul III with his cardinal-nephew Cardinal Alessandro Farnese (left) and his other grandson (right), Ottavio Farnese, Duke of Parma

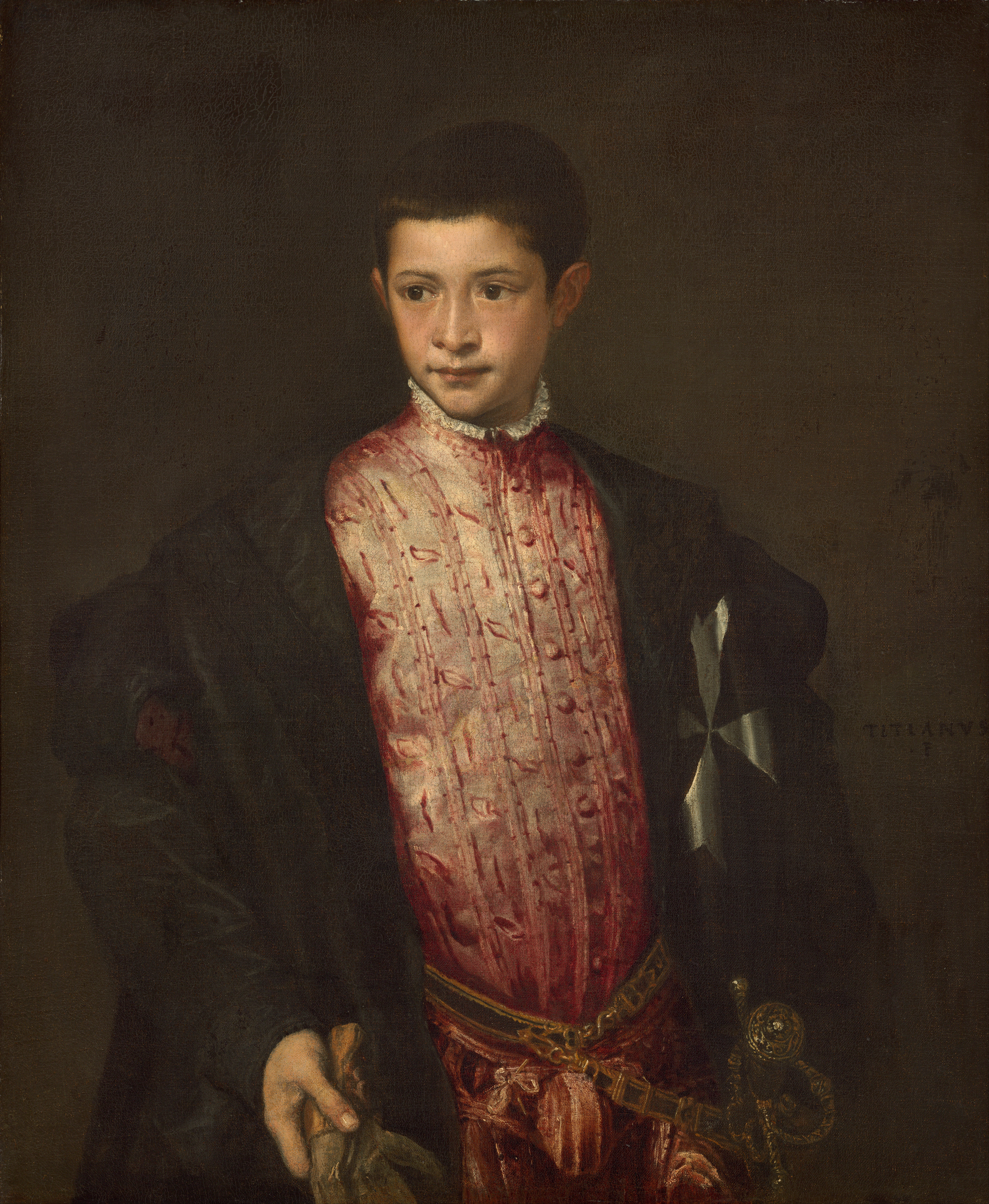
Ranuccio Farnese was made cardinal by Paul III at the age of 15.

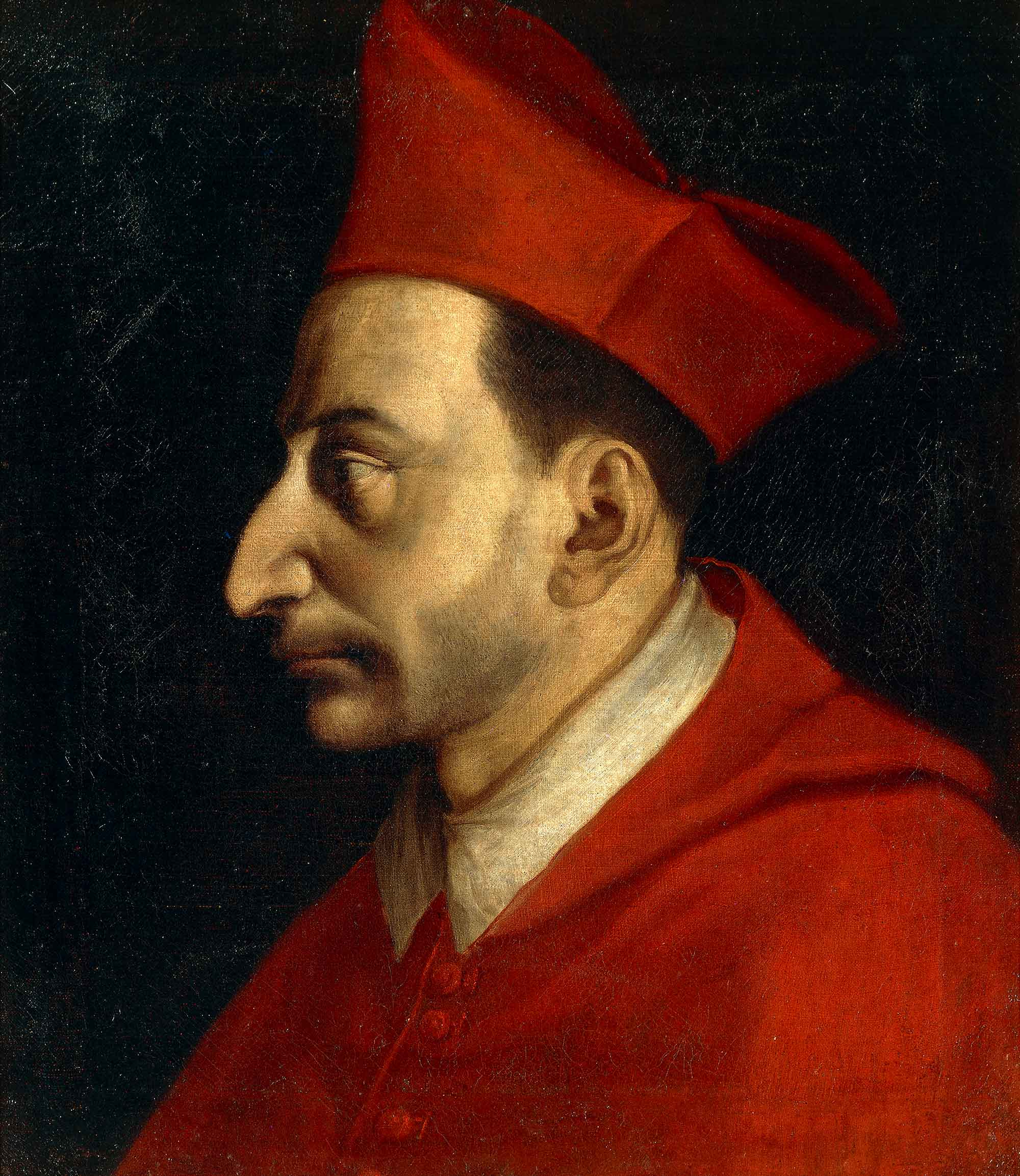
Charles Borromeo, one of the few canonized cardinal-nephews

Elevating pope	Cardinal-nephew	Date of elevation	Cardinal's relationship	Notes
Julius II (1503–1513)	Clemente Grosso della Rovere	29 November 1503	Unknown	
Julius II (1503–1513)	Galeotto Franciotti della Rovere	29 November 1503	Unknown	
Julius II (1503–1513)	Marco Vigerio della Rovere	1 December 1505	Distant relative	
Julius II (1503–1513)	Leonardo Grosso della Rovere	1 December 1505	Cousin	
Julius II (1503–1513)	Sisto Gara della Rovere	11 September 1507	Unknown	
Leo X (1513–1521)	Giulio de' Medici	23 September 1513	Cousin	Future Pope Clement VII
Leo X (1513–1521)	Innocenzo Cybo	23 September 1513	Son of pope's sister Maddalena de' Medici	
Leo X (1513–1521)	Luigi de' Rossi	1 July 1517	Cousin	
Leo X (1513–1521)	Francesco Armellini Pantalassi de' Medici	1 July 1517	Adopted as son	
Leo X (1513–1521)	Franciotto Orsini	1 July 1517	Nephew of pope's mother, Clarice Orsini	
Leo X (1513–1521)	Giovanni Salviati	1 July 1517	Son of pope's sister Lucrezia de' Medici	
Leo X (1513–1521)	Niccolò Ridolfi	1 July 1517	Son of pope's sister Contessina de' Medici	
Clement VII (1523–1534)	Niccolò Gaddi	3 May 1527	Related through Catherine de' Medici, daughter of pope's first cousin	
Clement VII (1523–1534)	Ippolito de' Medici	10 January 1529	Illegitimate son of pope's brother Giuliano de' Medici	
Paul III (1534–1549)	Alessandro Farnese	18 December 1534	Grandson	
Paul III (1534–1549)	Guido Ascanio Sforza di Santa Fiora	18 December 1534	Grandson	
Paul III (1534–1549)	Niccolò Caetani	22 December 1536 published 13 March 1538	Son of cousin	
Paul III (1534–1549)	Tiberio Crispo	19 December 1544	Brother, on his mother's side, of pope's daughter Costanza Farnese, possibly natural son of Paul III	
Paul III (1534–1549)	Ranuccio Farnese	16 December 1545	Grandson	
Paul III (1534–1549)	Giulio Feltre della Rovere	27 July 1547	Relative	
Julius III (1550–1555)	Innocenzo Ciocchi Del Monte	30 May 1550	Adopted	
Julius III (1550–1555)	Cristoforo Guidalotti Ciocchi del Monte	20 November 1551	Cousin	
Julius III (1550–1555)	Fulvio della Corgna	20 November 1551	Nephew on his mother's side	
Julius III (1550–1555)	Roberto de Nobili	22 December 1553	Grandnephew	
Julius III (1550–1555)	Girolamo Simoncelli	22 December 1553	Grandnephew	
Paul IV (1555–1559)	Carlo Carafa	7 June 1555	Unknown	
Paul IV (1555–1559)	Diomede Carafa	20 December 1555	Relative	
Paul IV (1555–1559)	Alfonso Carafa	15 March 1557	Grandnephew	
Pius IV (1559–1565)	St. Charles Borromeo	31 January 1560	Nephew	
Pius IV (1559–1565)	Giovanni Antonio Serbelloni	31 January 1560	Cousin of Charles Borromeo	
Pius IV (1559–1565)	Mark Sittich von Hohenems (or Marco Sittico d'Altemps	26 February 1561	Nephew	
Pius IV (1559–1565)	Alfonso Gesualdo	26 February 1561	Brother-in-law of Charles Borromeo	
Pius IV (1559–1565)	Gianfrancesco Gàmbara	26 February 1561	Stepbrother of Charles Borromeo	
Pius IV (1559–1565)	Francesco Alciati	12 March 1565	Relative	
Pius IV (1559–1565)	Guido Luca Ferrero	12 March 1565	Cousin of Charles Borromeo	
Pius IV (1559–1565)	Gianfrancesco Commendone	12 March 1565	Relative	
Pius V (1566–1572)	Michele Bonelli†	6 March 1566	Grandnephew	
Pius V (1566–1572)	Girolamo Rusticucci	17 May 1570	Relative	
Gregory XIII (1572–1585)	Filippo Boncompagni†	2 June 1572	Unknown	
Gregory XIII (1572–1585)	Filippo Guastavillani	5 July 1574	Unknown	
Gregory XIII (1572–1585)	Francesco Sforza di Santa Fiora	12 December 1583	Relative through his sister Costanza, wife of pope's son	
Sixtus V (1585–1590)	Alessandro Peretti di Montalto†	13 May 1585	Unknown	
Gregory XIV (1590–1591)	Paolo Emilio Sfondrati†	19 December 1590	Unknown	
Gregory XIV (1590–1591)	Flaminio Piatti	6 March 1591	Relative	
Innocent IX (1591)	Giovanni Antonio Facchinetti de Nuce†	18 December 1591	Grandnephew	
Clement VIII (1592–1605)	Pietro Aldobrandini†	17 September 1593	Nephew	
Clement VIII (1592–1605)	Cinzio Passeri Aldobrandini†	17 September 1593	Nephew	
Clement VIII (1592–1605)	Silvestro Aldobrandini	17 September 1603	Grandnephew	
Clement VIII (1592–1605)	Giovanni Battista Deti	3 March 1599	Relative	
Clement VIII (1592–1605)	Bonifazio Bevilacqua Aldobrandini	3 March 1599	Adopted while already a cardinal on 3 April 1601	

== 17th century ==
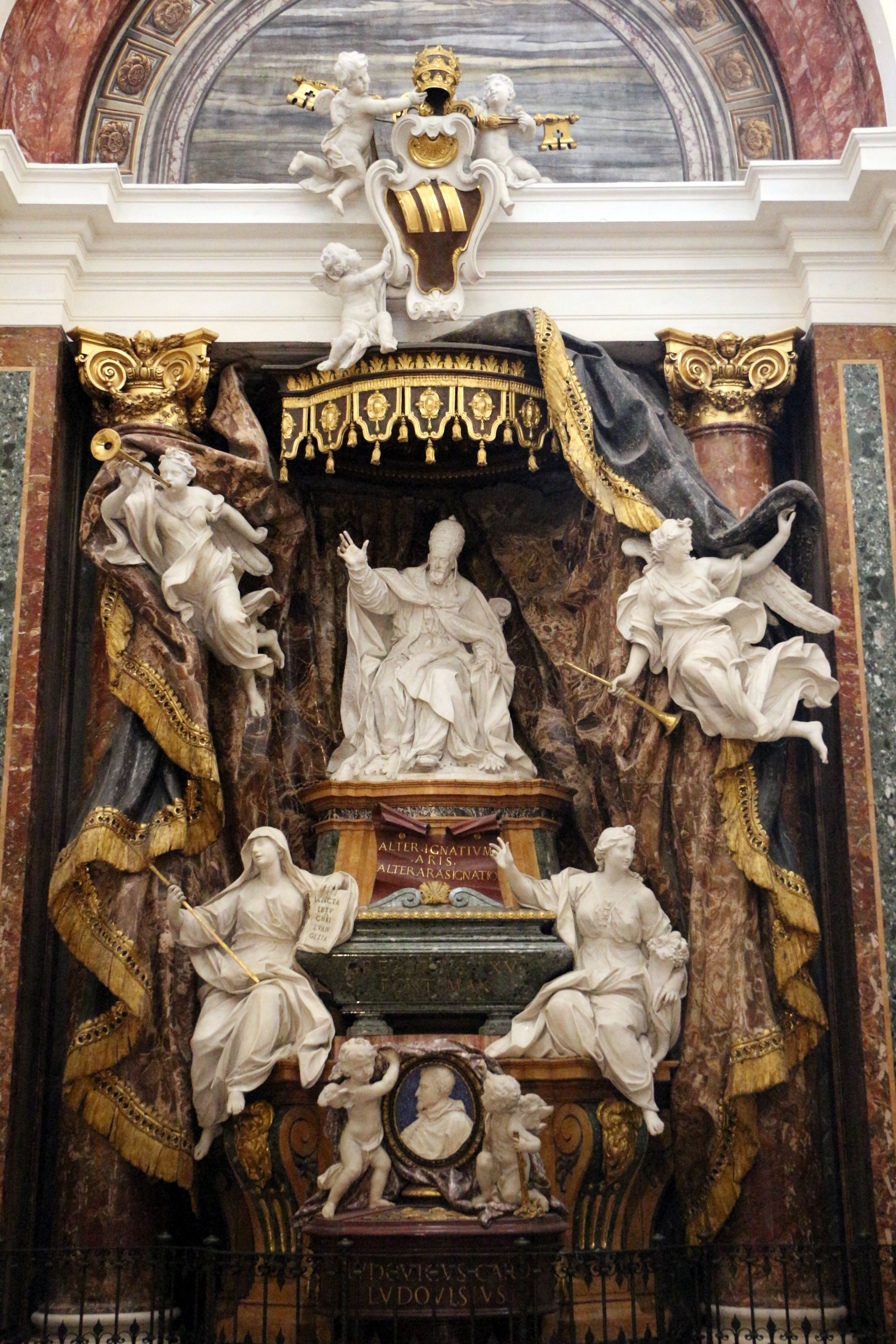
The tomb of Pope Gregory XV and his cardinal-nephew Ludovico Ludovisi

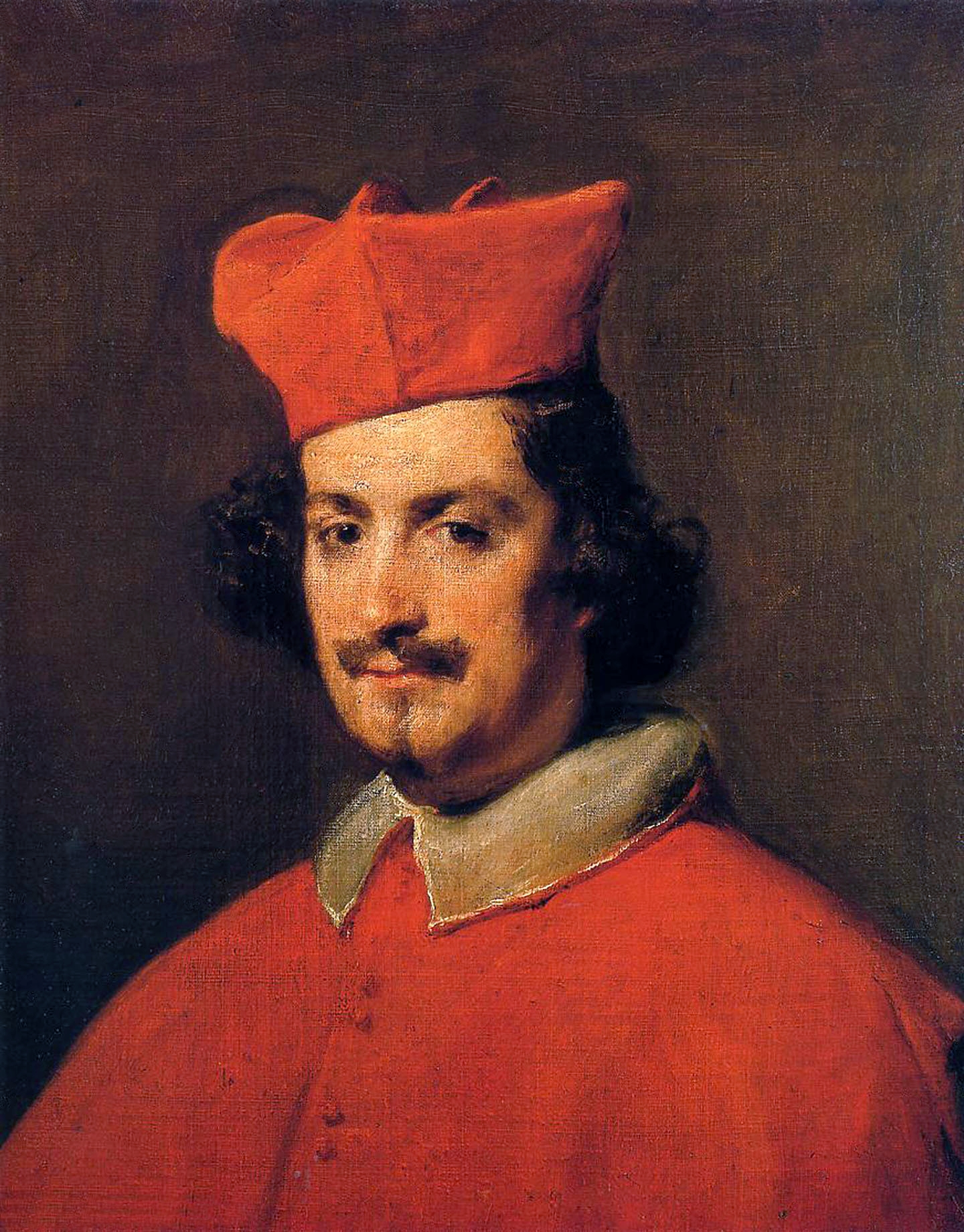
Camillo Astalli-Pamphili, painted by Velasquez

Elevating pope	Cardinal-nephew	Date of elevation	Relationship	Notes
Paul V (1605–1621)	Scipione Borghese Caffarelli†	18 July 1605	Nephew	
Paul V (1605–1621)	Giambattista Leni	24 November 1608	Distant relative	
Paul V (1605–1621)	Tiberio Muti	2 December 1615	Unknown	
Gregory XV (1621–1623)	Ludovico Ludovisi†	15 February 1621	Nephew	
Gregory XV (1621–1623)	Marcantonio Gozzadini	21 July 1621	Cousin	
Urban VIII (1623–1644)	Francesco Barberini†	2 October 1623	Nephew	
Urban VIII (1623–1644)	Lorenzo Magalotti	7 October 1624	Brother-in-law of Brother	
Urban VIII (1623–1644)	Antonio Marcello Barberini	7 October 1624	Brother	
Urban VIII (1623–1644)	Antonio Barberini	30 August 1627	Nephew	
Urban VIII (1623–1644)	Francesco Maria Macchiavelli	6 December 1641	Relative	
Innocent X (1644–1655)	Camillo Francesco Maria Pamphili†	14 November 1644	Son of Innocent X's sister-in-law Olimpia Maidalchini	Resigned 21 January 1647
Innocent X (1644–1655)	Francesco Maidalchini†	7 October 1647	Nephew of Olimpia Maidalchini	
Innocent X (1644–1655)	Camillo Astalli†	19 September 1650	Cousin of Olimpia Maidalchini	Deprived of the title of nipote in February 1654
Alexander VII (1655–1667)	Flavio Chigi†	9 April 1657	Nephew	
Alexander VII (1655–1667)	Antonio Bichi	9 April 1657	Unknown	
Clement IX (1667–1669)	Giacomo Rospigliosi†	12 December 1667	Nephew	
Clement X (1670–1676)	Paluzzo Paluzzi Altieri degli Albertoni†	24 January 1664 (by Pope Alexander VII)	Adopted while already a cardinal	
Clement X (1670–1676)	Vincenzo Maria Orsini	22 February 1672	Relative	Future Pope Benedict XIII
Innocent XI (1676–1689)	Carlo Stefano Anastasio Ciceri	2 September 1686	Distant relative	
Alexander VIII (1689–1691)	Pietro Ottoboni†	7 November 1689	Grandnephew	
Alexander VIII (1689–1691)	Giovanni Battista Rubini	13 February 1690	Unknown	

== 18th century ==
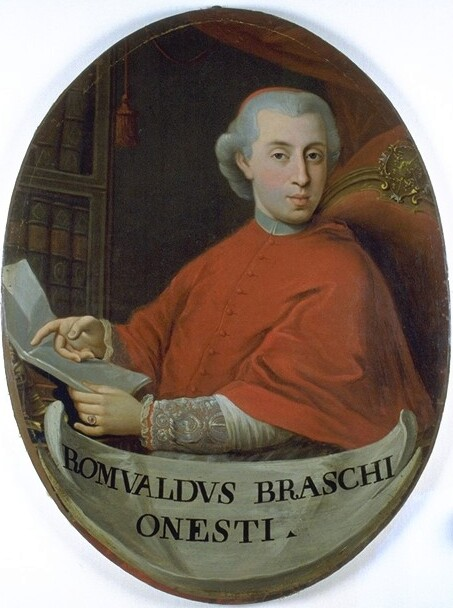
Romualdo Braschi-Onesti

Elevating pope	Cardinal-nephew	Date of elevation	Relationship	Notes
Clement XI (1700–1721)	Annibale Albani	23 December 1711	Unknown	
Clement XI (1700–1721)	Fabio Olivieri	6 May 1715	Cousin	
Innocent XIII (1721–1724)	Bernardo Maria Conti	16 June 1721	Brother	
Clement XII (1730–1740)	Neri Maria Corsini	14 August 1730	Nephew	
Clement XII (1730–1740)	Giovanni Antonio Guadagni	24 September 1731	Nephew on mother's side, son of Maddalena Corsini	
Clement XIII (1758–1769)	Carlo Rezzonico	11 September 1758	Nephew	
Pius VI (1775–1799)	Giovanni Carlo Bandi	29 May 1775	Uncle	
Pius VI (1775–1799)	Barnaba Chiaramonti	14 February 1785	Relative on his mother's side	Future Pope Pius VII
Pius VI (1775–1799)	Romualdo Braschi-Onesti	18 December 1786	Nephew	

== 19th century ==
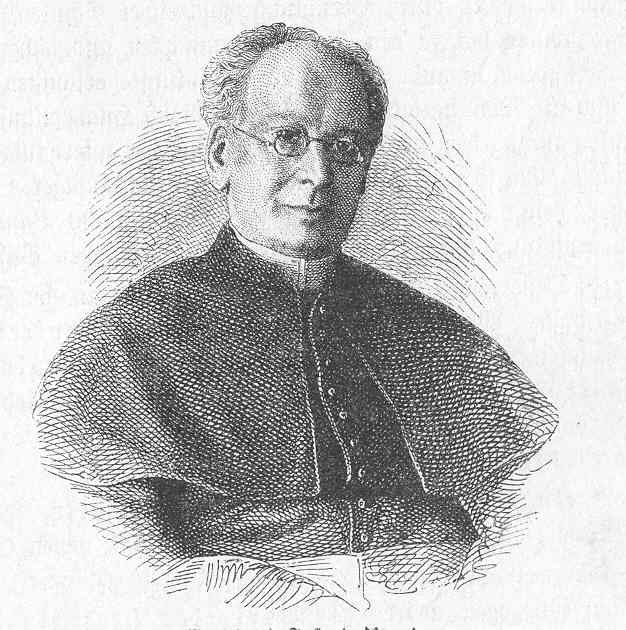
Giuseppe Pecci

Elevating pope	Cardinal-nephew	Date of elevation	Relationship	Notes
Leo XIII (1878–1903)	Giuseppe Pecci	12 May 1879	Brother	
