= 1378 conclave =

Election of Pope Urban VI

Papal conclave April 1378

Dates and location
- 7–9 April 1378; Old St. Peter's Basilica, Papal States

Key officials
- Dean: Ange de Grimoard
- Sub-dean: Pietro Corsini
- Protodeacon: Hugues de Saint-Martial

Elected pope
- Bartolomeo Prignano; Name taken: Urban VI
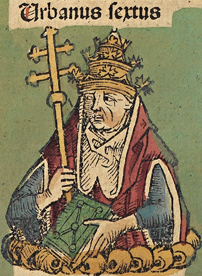

The 1378 papal conclave, held from 7–9 April 1378, was the papal conclave which was the immediate cause of the Western Schism in the Catholic Church. The conclave was one of the shortest in the history of the Catholic Church. The conclave was also the first held in the Vatican and in Old St. Peter's Basilica since 1159 (the elections and conclaves in Rome prior to the Avignon Papacy having been held mostly in the Basilica of St. John Lateran).

Pope Gregory XI died on 26 March 1378, in Rome, having returned from Avignon to pursue his territorial interests in the Papal States during the War of the Eight Saints. Although the French cardinals constituted a majority of the College of Cardinals due to the preceding Avignon Papacy, they succumbed to the will of the Roman mob, which demanded the election of an Italian pontiff. They elected Bishop Bartolommeo Prignano, who took the name Pope Urban VI. This is the most recent time a non-cardinal has been elected pope.

== Proceedings ==
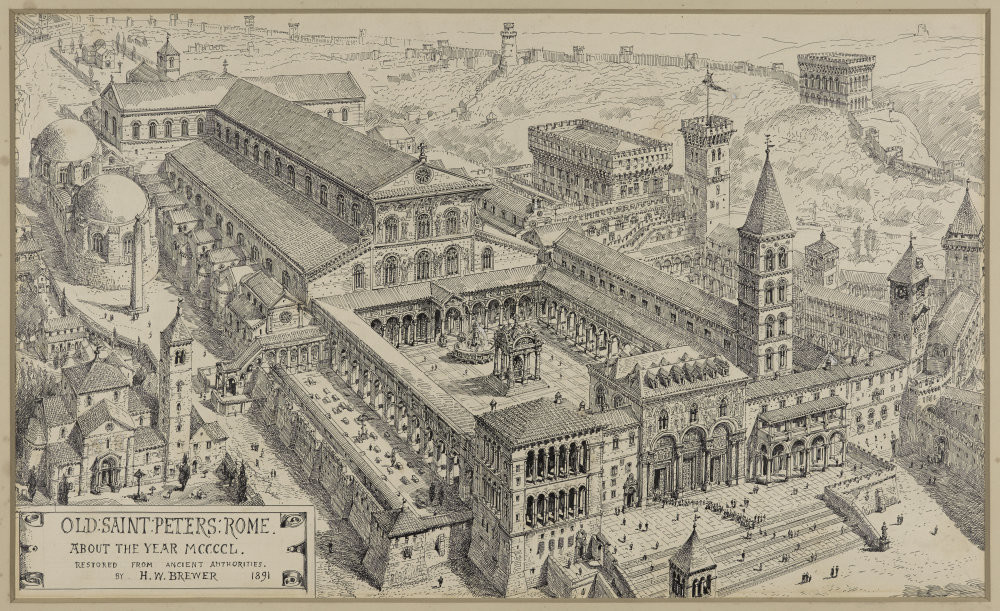
The conclave was the first held in Old St. Peter's Basilica.

Before his death, Gregory XI substantially loosened the laws of the conclave: he instructed the cardinals to begin immediately after his death (rather than waiting the nine days prescribed by the Ordo Romanis) to prevent "factional coercion", he gave the cardinals permission to hold the conclave outside of Rome and move it as many times as necessary, and also seemingly suspended the two-thirds requirement, replacing it with "the greater part" (an ambiguous statement, in the original).

The cardinals were divided into three factions: the first constituting the four Italian cardinals (two Romans, one Florentine, and one Milanese), the second constituting the seven "Limoges" cardinals (referred to individually as "Limousins"), and the third constituting the five remaining French cardinals. The conclave was delayed one day because of a violent storm, and thereafter the seven Limoges cardinals wishing to leave Rome as Gregory XI had authorized them to were persuaded by the others that such an act would place the college in even more danger. It was midnight on the second day before the servants of the cardinals succeeded in clearing the Old Basilica of those not permitted to remain in the conclave.

According to the Catholic Encyclopedia, even Robert of Geneva (future Antipope Clement VII) and Pedro Martínez de Luna y Gotor (future Antipope Benedict XIII)—the two claimants of the Avignon line during the ensuing Schism—were among those who voted for Prignano. Prignano had previously lived in France, which may have softened the blow of his election to many of his French electors. The selection was supposedly "unanimous", with the exception of Giacomo Orsini, who claimed that he was not "free" enough to vote.

Prignano was accompanied by several other prelates (to conceal the identity of the selected candidate) to the Vatican to accept his election. To further the confusion, Orsini gave the Habemus Papam without identifying Prignano. Upon the conclusion of the election, the Roman mob entered the site of the conclave, under the impression that an aged Roman cardinal Tebaldeschi (who had been left in possession of the papal insignia) had been elected, an impression that the remaining cardinals did not disabuse them of as they fled to their personal quarters. The remaining cardinal informed the crowd of the election of Prignano who was hiding in the "most secret room" until his election could be announced.

== Cardinal electors ==
Sixteen of the twenty-three active cardinals took part in the conclave. Two possible other cardinals—Piero Tornaquinci and Pietro Tartaro—were not accepted into the ranks of the college for the election. Six more cardinals remained in Avignon, and Jean de la Grange was absent as well.

Elector	Nationality	Cardinalatial order and title	Elevated	Elevator	Other ecclesiastical titles	Notes
Pietro Corsini	Florentine	Cardinal-bishop of Porto e Santa Rufina	1370, 7 June	Urban V	Sub-dean of the Sacred College of Cardinals	
Jean du Cros	French	Cardinal-bishop of Palestrina	1371, 30 May	Gregory XI	Grand penitentiary	Cardinal-nephew
Guillaume d'Aigrefeuille, iuniore, O.S.B.	French	Cardinal-priest of S. Stefano al Monte Celio	1367, 12 May	Urban V	Camerlengo of the College of Cardinals	
Francesco Tebaldeschi	Roman	Cardinal-priest of S. Sabina	1368, 22 September	Urban V		
Bertrand Lagier, O.F.M.	French	Cardinal-priest of S. Cecilia	1371, 30 May	Gregory XI		
Robert de Genève	French	Cardinal-priest of Ss. XII Apostoli	1371, 30 May	Gregory XI		Future Antipope Clement VII
Simone Brossano	Milanese	Cardinal-priest of Ss. Giovanni e Paolo	1375, 20 December	Gregory XI		
Hugues de Montelais, le jeune	French	Cardinal-priest of Ss. IV Coronati	1375, 20 December	Gregory XI		
Gui de Maillesec	French	Cardinal-priest of S. Croce in Gerusalemme	1375, 20 December	Gregory XI		Cardinal-nephew
Pierre de Sortenac	French	Cardinal-priest of S. Lorenzo in Lucina	1375, 20 December	Gregory XI		
Gérard du Puy, O.S.B.	French	Cardinal-priest of S. Clemente	1375, 20 December	Gregory XI		Cardinal-nephew
Giacomo Orsini	Roman	Cardinal-deacon of S. Giorgio in Velabro	1371, 30 May	Gregory XI		
Pierre Flandrin	French	Cardinal-deacon of S. Eustachio	1371, 30 May	Gregory XI	Vicar of Rome	
Guillaume Noellet	French	Cardinal-deacon of S. Angelo in Pescheria	1371, 30 May	Gregory XI		
Pierre de la Vergne	French	Cardinal-deacon of S. Maria in Via Lata	1371, 30 May	Gregory XI		
Pedro Martínez de Luna y Gotor	Aragonese	Cardinal-deacon of S. Maria in Cosmedin	1375, 20 December	Gregory XI		Future Antipope Benedict XIII

=== Absentee cardinals ===
Elector	Nationality	Cardinalatial order and title	Elevated	Elevator	Other ecclesiastical titles	Notes
Pierre de Monteruc	French	Cardinal-priest of S. Anastasia	1356, 23 December	Innocent VI	Vice-Chancellor of the Holy Roman Church; protopriest	Remained in Avignon; Cardinal-nephew
Jean de Blandiac	French	Cardinal-bishop of Sabina	1361, 17 September	Innocent VI		Remained in Avignon
Gilles Aycelin de Montaigu	French	Cardinal-bishop of Frascati	1361, 17 September	Innocent VI		Remained in Avignon
Hugues de Saint-Martial	French	Cardinal-deacon of S. Maria in Portico	1361, 17 September	Innocent VI	Protodeacon; archpriest of the Vatican Basilica	Remained in Avignon
Ange de Grimoard, C.R.S.A.	French	Cardinal-bishop of Albano	1366, 18 September	Urban V	Dean of the College of Cardinals; archpriest of the Lateran Basilica	Remained in Avignon; Cardinal-nephew
Guillaume de Chanac, O.S.B.	French	Cardinal-priest of S. Vitale	1371, 30 May	Gregory XI		Remained in Avignon
Jean de la Grange, O.S.B.	French	Cardinal-priest of S. Marcello	1375, 20 December	Gregory XI		Papal legate in Tuscany

== Aftermath ==
Map showing support for Avignon (red) and Rome (blue) during the Western Schism; this breakdown is accurate until the Council of Pisa (1409), which created a third line of claimants. Caution: this map is highly inaccurate in some regions and borders, see its talk page.

The following September, the French cardinals reunited in Avignon, moved to Fondi, and elected Antipope Clement VII, who gained the support of all thirteen of his electors (at the time the entire College numbered twenty-two due to the death of Francesco Tebaldeschi).

== Sources ==
Inquisitor Nicholas Eymerich witnessed the conclave, and then went on to write one of the first tracts against Urban VI, Tractatus de potestate papali (1383), which argued in favor of the legitimacy of the Avignon line of papal claimants. Several other eyewitnesses recorded the chant of the Roman crowd: "We want a Roman or at least an Italian" (Italian: Romano lo volemo, o al manco Italiano). The contemporary curial document Factum Urbani attested to the general atmosphere of confusion, fear, and panic. For example, canonist Gilles Bellemère recounted removing his clerical garb for fear of the mob and the constant ringing of bells.

Pro-Urban sources—such as Alfonso de Jaén, the confessor of Bridget of Sweden, her daughter Catharine, and Dietrich of Nieheim—claim that the situation in Rome was less restless. The marked discrepancy between the classes of sources can be explained by the fact that the alleged duress of the mob became the primary argument in favor of the legitimacy of the Avignon claimants.
