= Arnaud Aubert =

French Catholic archbishop (d. 1371)

Arnaud Aubert (died 11 June 1371) was nephew of Pope Innocent VI, who appointed him Bishop of Agde (1354), then Bishop of Carcassonne (1354–57) and finally Archbishop of Auch (from January 1357 until his death). He was Camerlengo of the Holy Roman Church from March 1361 and exercised that post during a sede vacante in 1362 and 1370. He was later vicar and administrator of the see of Avignon 1366–1367. He died at Avignon.

Catholic Church titles
Preceded by Stefano Aldebrandi Cambaruti	Chamberlain of the Apostolic Camera; 1361–1371	Succeeded by Pierre de Cros
Preceded by Guillaume de Flavacourt	Archbishop of Auch; 1357–1371	Succeeded by Jean Roger
