= Pierre de Murat de Cros =

French monk and cardinal of aristocratic origins

Pierre de Murat de Cros, O.S.B., (c. 1320 – 1388) was a French monk of aristocratic origins who became a cardinal of the Avignon Obedience during the Great Schism, as well as the Archbishop of Arles and the Chamberlain of the Apostolic Camera (Latin: Camerarius Apostolicus). Refusing from the day of his election to support Bartolomeo Prignano (Pope Urban VI, the former head of the rival Apostolic Chancellery) after the Papal Conclave of 1378, de Cros played a critical role in delivering a considerable portion of the Roman Curia to the rival claimant Robert of Geneva, who took the name Clement VII. Historian Daniel Williman calls Murat de Cros's actions a "counter-coup".

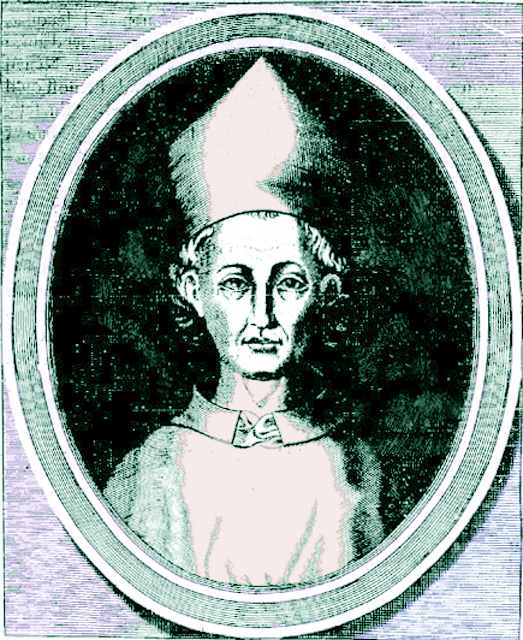
Pierre de Murat de Cros, was a French monk.

== Early life ==
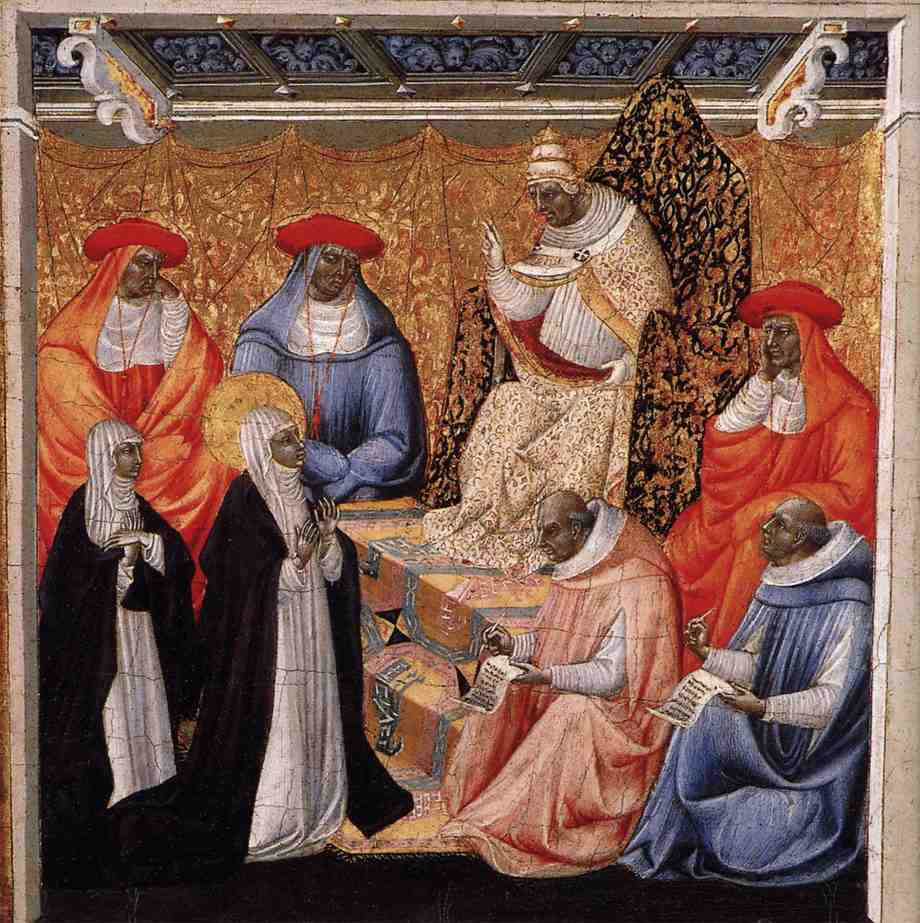
De Cros was the cousin of Pope Gregory XI (shown here blessing St. Catherine of Siena, who repeatedly importuned him to move the seat of the papacy back to Rome), and was the brother of cardinal-nephew Jean de Murat de Cros. Both are possibly depicted here.

Pierre was born in La Chaul in the ancient Province of Limousin. He was the son of Aymar de Murat de Cros, a nobleman of Auvergnat extraction, and of Marie de Montclar. He entered the Order of Saint Benedict in his youth, and after living in several French monasteries became Bishop of Saint-Papoul in July 1362. On 9 June 1370 he was transferred to the Metropolitan See of Bourges.

Pierre was the brother of Jean de Murat de Cros, who became the Bishop of Limoges, and both were cousins of Pope Gregory XI and thus favored by him in the administration of the Curia, after his election in 1370. Jean was named a cardinal-nephew and one of the first cardinals of Gregory XI upon his ascension to the papacy. Pierre, already the Bishop of Bourges and a staff member of the Camera, was named Papal Chamberlain that same year, succeeding the deceased Arnaud Aubert (d. 1371). In 1374, he was given the wealthy Archbishopric of Arles.

== Chamberlain of the Camera ==
=== Under Gregory XI ===
Pierre de Cros was the "most important and powerful courtier" of the pope, and their bedchambers were joined by a secret staircase. According to Williman, "it is no exaggeration to say that his powers and functions combined those of a minister of finance, a chief justice and a secretary of state, as well as major-domo of the papal household". He accompanied Gregory XI in the last year of his reign to Anagni from 16 May to 7 November 1377, when the pope relied on him for his "most important correspondence" rather than the Chancellery. De Cros grew suspicious of the intrigues of Bartolommeo Prignano, the acting-head of the Chancellery, hearing that he was attending the meetings of the bandaresi. Senator Gui de Prohins, named as military governor of Rome by Gregory XI, was not a party to their intrigues, being loyal to the Pope.

Pierre de Cros also controlled the Apostolic Camera (established 1361), the judicial wing of the Camera, which had "absolute and final" jurisdiction over any case affecting the interests of the Camera, even if already pending in front of other ecclesiastical courts, and even if they involved issues of theology. This court was not burdened by the ordo iudiciarius, the slow and formalistic rules of the papal courts, but rather gave expedited and summary rulings.

It was in no small part due to the unwillingness of Murat to coerce the extreme taxation ordered by Gregory XI, that the pontiff found himself bankrupt by his wars against the Visconti and ultimately by the War of the Eight Saints, fought against a coalition of Italy city states led by the Republic of Florence, which instigated rebellion in the Papal States. While Gregory XI was forced to borrow from the Duke of Anjou, Murat excelled at diplomacy, convincing Bologna to relent in exchange for a lifting of the interdict.

De Cros drafted and persuaded his cousin Gregory XI to adopt Futuris peculis on 19 March, modifying the laws of the papal conclave. He also persuaded Gregory XI to make Pierre Rostaing, the castellan of Castel Sant'Angelo to swear not to turn over the fortress to any papal claimant without the assent of the six cardinals remaining in the Comtat Venaissin. Fearing for his own life, he moved into the fortress and prepared it for a long siege. Rather than guarding the conclave personally (as he would later do at Fondi), Murat de Cros deputized the Bishop of Valence and Die to perform the task.

=== During the Western Schism ===
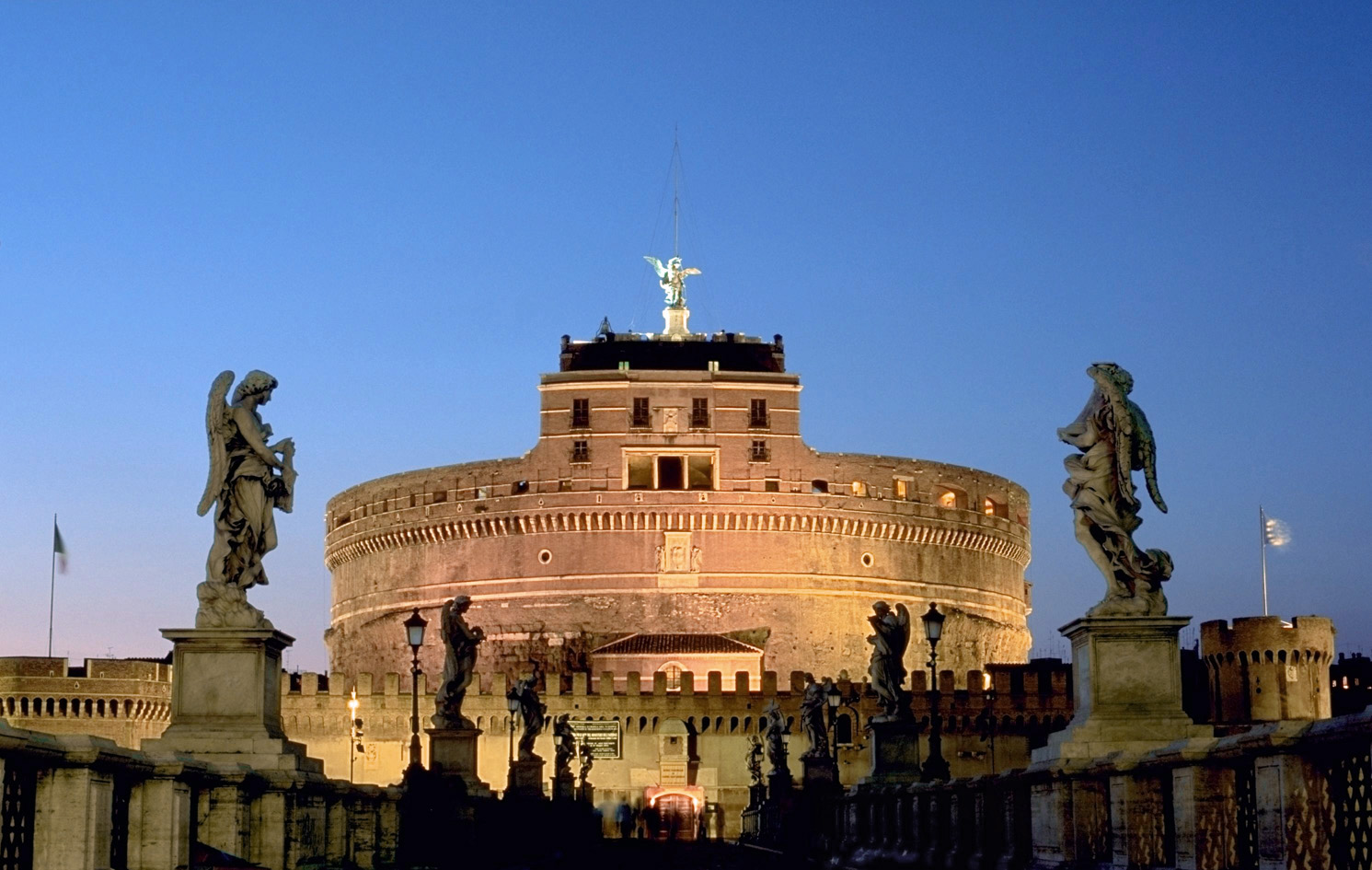
Murat de Cros remained in the fortified Castel Sant'Angelo during the Papal Conclave of 1378.

De Cros did not accept the election of Prignano as Urban VI, and sheltered in Castel Sant'Angelo a group of like-minded cardinals, which included his brother. He met the bardaresi, carrying a battleaxe and followed by a heavily armed entourage, refusing to allow him to escort the cardinals back for a papal coronation ("That fool thinks he’s pope? I surely don’t consider him pope"). Later in the day Murat de Cros and the other cardinals went to pay homage to Urban VI although he feigned illness to avoid the coronation. He carried on his duties as chamberlain as if Gregory XI were still in power and Urban VI did not exist, refusing to date his letters according to the latter's election.

As Chamberlain of the Camera (Camerlengo), de Cros held a curial office which was one of the few that did not expire during a sede vacante, as established by the bull Ubi periculum (1274). He persuaded the entire College of Cardinals to convene in Anagni, himself leaving Castel Sant'Angelo between 25 June and 1 July. He issued a formal summons to Prignano to appear before a cameral tribunal in Anagni, and sometime before 10 July declared him excommunicated and deprived of his Archbishopric of Bari. Also under the judicial power of the Apostolic Camera, Murat de Cros received the cardinals on 2 August, and after hearing accounts of the conclave, declared it null and void and the church to continue in sede vacante. This meeting was neither a consistory or a conclave but a tribunal with Murat de Cros presiding as an ordinary judge.

De Cros worked to arrange a meeting of the College of Cardinals at Fondi on 20 September 1378 which elected Robert of Geneva as Clement VII. According to Williman, "de Cros used his huge discretionary powers to make himself virtually a regent or protector, a keeper of the papal power sede vacante". It was at this point that Murat de Cros appointed a new procurator and registrar for the Camera, and assisted Clement VII in turning out copious amounts of official-looking documents.

== Cardinal ==
On 23 December 1383 Clement VII of the Avignon Obedience named him cardinal-priest of the Basilica of Santi Nereo e Achilleo. On the following day he resigned as Camerlengo, but retained the Archbishopric of Arles until January 1388. From that time he was known as Cardinalis Arelatensis, the "Cardinal of Arles". In April 1385 he was legate of Clement VII to Queen Maria of Naples in Villeneuve-lès-Avignon. He died at Avignon on 16 November 1388.

== Sources ==
Dee Cros recounted his version of the outbreak of the Schism in Avignon to the ambassadors of John I of Castile on 30 May 1380. His deposition was edited and published by J. M. H. Albanes in his Gallia christiana novissima (1669).

== Legacy ==
According to Williman, de Cros was instrumental in beginning the Western Schism, and creating a true split in the Western Church without precedent among the antipopes of preceding centuries, who had wielded little popular or international support:

"The Western Schism had its roots within the papal Curia. Even before there were two international obediences, or two popes, even before two legal opinions began to be argued about the validity of the April election, and before the ultramontane cardinals and Urban VI had gone to their separate summer refuges of Anagni and Tivoli, the nucleus of the Curia was split in interest and policy between two ministers, the heads of the Chancery and of the Camera, Bartolomeo Prignano and Pierre de Cros."

== Bibliography ==
- Konrad Eubel, Hierarchia Catholica Medii Aevi, I, Münster, 1913.
- Daniel Williman, ed., The Letters of Pierre de Cros, Chamberlain to Pope Gregory XI, 1371–1378, Arizona Center for Medieval and Renaissance Studies, 2009.

Catholic Church titles
Preceded by Pierre d'Estaing	Archbishop of Bourges; 1370–1374	Succeeded by Bertrand de Chenac
Preceded by Arnaud Aubert	Chamberlain of the Apostolic Camera; 1371–1383	Succeeded by François de Conzie
Preceded by Guillaume de La Garde	Archbishop of Arles; 1374–1388	Succeeded by François de Conzié
