= List of papal relatives created cardinal =

This is a list of papal relatives created cardinal by a pope other than their relative. These creates are similar to cardinal-nephews but this list does not include cardinals included in the list of cardinal-nephews.

== List ==
Cardinal	"Nephew" of	Elevator	Elevated	Notes
Giovanni Aniceo (relative)	Gregory I	Pelagius II	circa 580	
Pope Paul I (brother)	Stephen II	Pope Zachary	Before 750	Future Pope Paul I
Romano Marin	Pope Marinus I	Pope Nicholas I	cira 867	
Cristoforo (relative)	Leo V	Sergius III	circa 904-911	
Leone (brother)	Pope Leo VI	Pope John XI	circa 931-936	Future Pope Leo VII
Pietro Ruffino (nephew)	Paschalis II	Callixtus II	9 March 1118	
Gregorio della Suburra (nephew)	Anastasius IV	Innocent II	1 March 1140	His relationship with Anastasius IV is not explicitly confirmed in the contemporary sources
Giovanni Paparoni	Pope Innocent II	Pope Celestine II	17 December 1143	
Giovanni Caccianemici (nephew)	Lucius II	Celestine II	17 December 1143	
Cinzio Papareschi	Pope Innocent II	Pope Adrian IV	14 March 1158	Credibility of the evidence for his relationship with Innocent II is uncertain
Graziano da Pisa (nephew)	Eugenius III	Alexander III	4 March 1178	
Bobo (relative)	Celestine III	Lucius III	18 December 1182	
Ottaviano di Paoli (or Conti) (relative)	Innocent III	Lucius III	18 December 1182	Cardinal's nephew married the niece of Innocent III
Bobo (relative)	Celestine III	Clement III	12 March 1188	
Alessio Capocci (nephew)	Anastasius IV	Clement III	12 March 1188	His relationship with Anastasius IV is unconfirmed
Gregorio Bobone (nephew)	Celestine III	Clement III	22 September 1190	
Guido Papareschi (relative)	Innocent II	Clement III	22 September 1190	
Pietro di Morra (relative)	Gregory VIII	Innocent III	18 December 1204	His relationship with Gregory VIII and the surname de Morra are not proven
Tommaso da Capua	Pope Honorius IV	Pope Innocent III	5 March 1216	
Aldobrandino Orsini	Pope Celestine III	Pope Honorius III	December 1216	
Goffredo da Castiglione	Pope Urban III	Pope Gregory IX	18 September 1227	future Pope Celestine IV; his relationship with Urban III is disputed
Pietro Capocci	Pope Honorius III	Pope Innocent IV	28 May 1244	
Matteo Orsini Rosso	Pope Nicholas III	Pope Urban IV	22 May 1262	Not to be confused with Senator Matteo Rosso Orsini
Napoleone Orsini Frangipani	Pope Nicholas III	Pope Nicholas IV	16 May 1288	
Francesco Napoleone Orsini	Pope Nicholas III	Pope Boniface VIII	12 December 1295	
Luca Fieschi	Pope Adrian V	Pope Boniface VIII	2 March 1300	
Giovanni Gaetano Orsini	Pope Nicholas III	Pope John XXII	17 December 1316	
Gaillard de la Mothe	Pope Clement V	Pope John XXII	17 December (or 18), 1316	
Jean de Carmin	Pope John XXII	Pope Clement VI	17 December 1350	
Gilles Aycelin de Montaigu	Pope Clement VI	Pope Innocent VI	17 September 1361	
Guillaume d'Aigrefeuille	Pope Clement VI	Pope Urban V	12 May 1367	
Francesco Carbone Tomacelli	Boniface IX	Urban VI	17 December 1384	Cardinal Carbone's mother married a brother of Pope Boniface IX in second nuptials, after the death of the cardinal's father
Giovanni Domenico de Cupis	Pope Julius II	Pope Leo X	1 July 1517	the son of the mother of Julius II's illegitimate daughter, Felice della Rovere
Agostino Spinola (grandnephew)	Pope Sixtus IV	Pope Clement VII	3 May 1527	
Alessandro Sforza	Pope Paul III	Pope Pius IV	12 March 1565	
Giovanni Aldobrandini (brother)	Pope Clement VIII	Pope Pius V	17 May 1570	
Roberto Ubaldini	Pope Leo XI	Pope Paul V	2 December 1615	
Francesco Boncompagni	Pope Gregory XIII	Pope Gregory XV	19 April 1621	Grandson of Gregory XIII
Ippolito Aldobrandini (grandnephew)	Pope Clement VIII	Pope Gregory XV	19 April 1621	
Carlo Barberini	Pope Urban VIII	Pope Innocent X	23 June 1653	Grand-nephew of Pope Urban VIII, son of Taddeo Barberini
Felice Rospigliosi	Pope Clement IX	Pope Clement X	16 January 1673	
Benedetto Pamphili (grandnephew)	Pope Innocent X	Pope Innocent XI	1 September 1681	
Francesco Pignatelli	Pope Innocent XII	Pope Clement XI	17 December 1703	
Alessandro Albani (cousin)	Pope Clement XI	Pope Innocent XIII	16 July 1721	
Domenico Orsini d'Aragona	Pope Benedict XIII	Pope Benedict XIV	9 September 1743	
Andrea Corsini (grandnephew)	Pope Clement XII	Pope Clement XIII	24 September 1759	
Gabriele della Genga Sermattei	Pope Leo XII	Pope Gregory XVI	1 February 1836	
