= Sachsenspiegel =

Medieval German Law Book

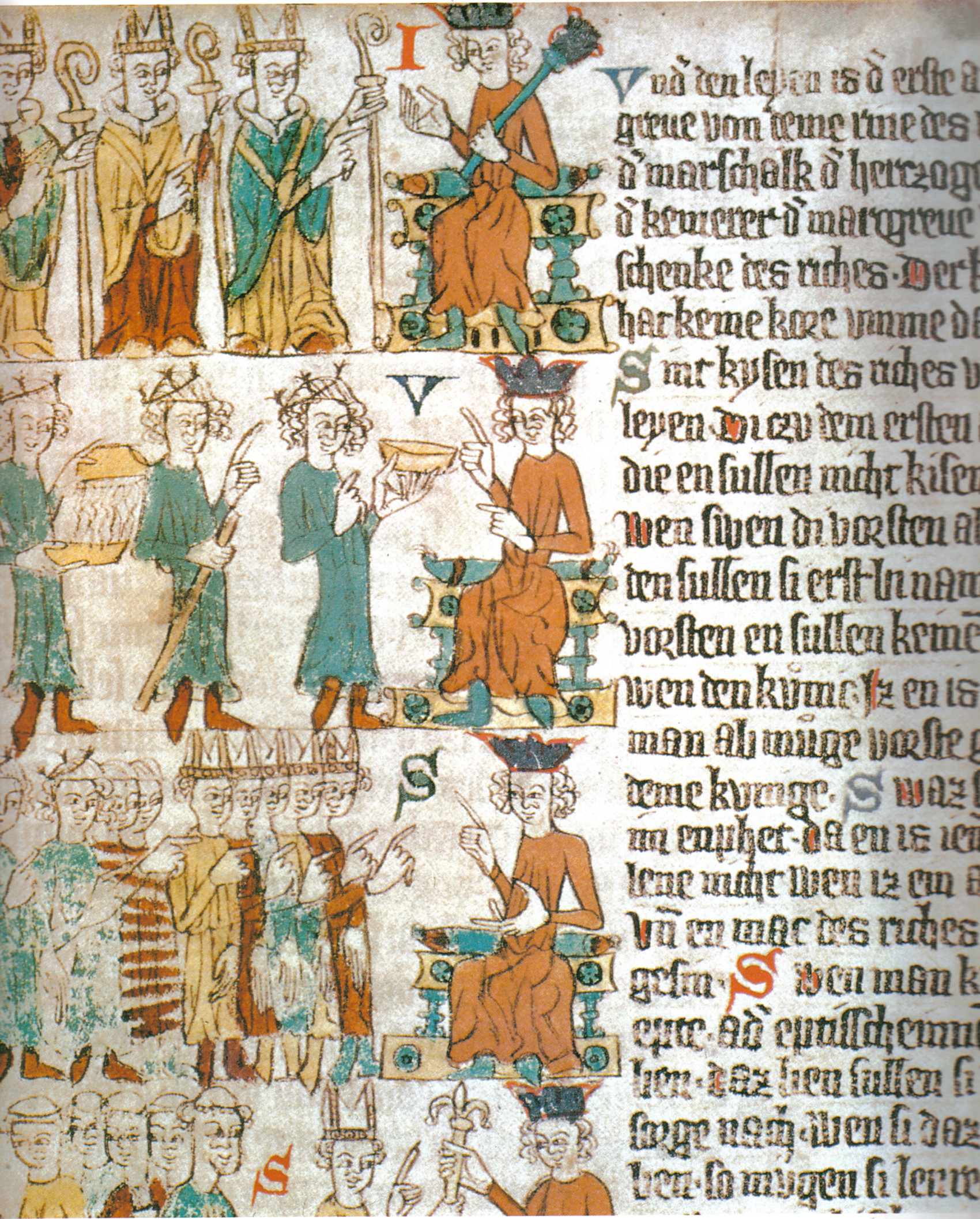
Choosing the king. Top: the three ecclesiastical princes choosing the king, pointing at him. Middle: the Count Palatine of the Rhine hands over a golden bowl, acting as a servant. Behind him, the Duke of Saxony with his marshall's staff and the Margrave of Brandenburg bringing a bowl of warm water, as a valet. Below, the new king in front of the great men of the empire (Heidelberg Sachsenspiegel, around 1300)

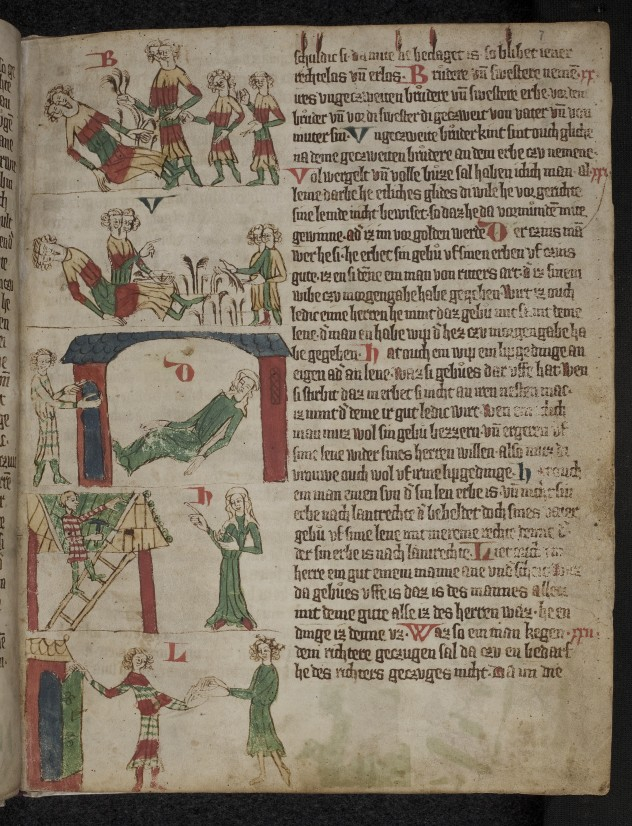
Page in Sachsenspiegel about succession (Heidelberg edition)

The Sachsenspiegel (German: [ˈzaksn̩ˌʃpiːɡl̩]; Middle Low German: Sassen Speyghel; modern Low German: Sassenspegel; all literally "Saxon Mirror") is one of the most important law books and custumals compiled during the Holy Roman Empire. Originating between 1220 and 1235 as a record of local customary law and rulings, it was used in places until as late as 1900. Some legal principles recorded in the Sachsenspiegel continued to apply into recent time laws. It is important not only for its lasting effect on later German and Dutch law but also as an early example of written prose in a Low German language. The Sachsenspiegel is the first comprehensive law book not in Latin, but in Middle Low German. A Latin edition is known to have existed, but only fragmented chapters remain.

== History ==
The Sachsenspiegel was one of the first prose works written in the Middle Low German language. The original title is Sassen Speyghel, Sachsenspiegel being a later German translation. It is believed to have been compiled and translated from Latin by the Saxon administrator Eike of Repgow at the behest of his liege lord Count Hoyer of Falkenstein in the years 1220 to 1235. Where the original was compiled is unclear. It was thought to have been written at Burg Falkenstein, but in 2007 Peter Landau, an expert in medieval canon law, suggested that it may have been written at the monastery of Altzelle (now Altzella).

== Opposition from the church ==
During the 14th century, Augustinian friar Johannes Klenkok of lower Saxony opposed the Sachsenspiegel in a pamphlet known as Decadicon because he considered ten articles or principles to contradict the Christian gospel and decisions of the church of Rome, collected as Corpus Juris Canonici. Klenkok presents criticisms on Sachsenspiegel's views of ecclesiastical and secular authorities, court procedure and private law. His position was that papal authority outrules every discussion of matters as legitimate procedure, the limitations of hereditary rights, the extent of testamentary power, the rights of novices and monks to family property, and the authority that determines superior and inferior legal norms and court decisions. So Klenkok's position was fundamentally a simple one: Papal authority supersedes every other political and legal authority.

The work sparked broad societal embitterment and irritation; the counselors of the city of Magdeburg, for instance, wrote warning letters to 400 or more cities, princes and lords that an Augustinian brother was trying to weaken Saxon law. Following a written debate, Klenkok did expand his Decadicon to twenty-one propositions of Saxon law and turned to his former disciple, French canonist, and cardinal of the Curia in Avignon, Pierre de la Vergne. In the end, Pope Gregory XI condemned 14 articles with his papal bull Salvator Humani Generis that was issued in 1374, but this did not reduce the success of the Sachsenspiegel. This controversy must be placed in the context of heavy papal inquisition campaigns against citizens opposing opinions of the church.

== Influence ==
The rules, laws, court decisions and principles compiled in the Sachsenspiegel have been influenced by much older (provincial) Roman law principles.

The Sachsenspiegel served as a model for law books in German (Middle High German) like the Augsburger Sachsenspiegel, the Deutschenspiegel, and the Schwabenspiegel. The Duchy of Saxony covered most of what nowadays is the northwestern part of Germany and eastern part of the Netherlands, but the rules spread more widely. The state of Utrecht, for instance, in 1632 knew the rule "Who comes first, grinds first", as published in the Placaatboek, a collection of decisions, rulings and local laws. The rule that married women stood under the custody of their husband, meaning that they could legally not act and had no say in juridical or childraising matters, was a rule of law in the Netherlands until 1956, in Belgium until 1958.

In Prussia, the Sachsenspiegel was used until the introduction of the Allgemeines Landrecht für die preußischen Staaten [General Land Law for the Prussian States] in 1794. In Saxony, it was used until the introduction of the Saxon Civil Code in 1865. In Anhalt and Thuringia, the Sachsenspiegel was not replaced until the introduction of the German Civil Code in 1900. Its precedents continued to be cited as pertinent case law as recently as 1932 by the Reichsgericht (Supreme Court of the Reich) (RGZ 137, 373).

The influence of the Sachsenspiegel, or at least parallels with it, can still be found in modern German and Dutch law, for instance in inheritance law, the law of neighborly relations (Nachbarrecht; e.g., nuisance, party walls, etc.) or usufructuary rights. The Sachsenspiegel is also important because, for the first time in history, the institution of slavery itself is condemned, because it is a violation of man's likeness to God.

The Sachsenspiegel contains two branches of law: common law and feudal law.

== Saxon custom ==
Saxon customary law, or Landrecht, was the law of free people including the peasant sokemanry. It contains important rules and regulations concerning property rights, inheritance, marriage, the delivery of goods, and certain torts (e.g. trespass, nuisance). It also treats criminal law and the composition of courts. In other words, it deals with criminal and civil law. The customs of the people were not a stand-alone pack of laws but influenced by older law systems like Roman law.

== Feudal law ==
Feudal law, or Lehnrecht, determined the relationship between different states and rulers, for example the election of emperors and kings, feudal rights, etc. Though it has no modern equivalent, it encompasses what one would call today public law.

The Sachsenspiegel acquired special significance through its exposition of the seven Heerschilde or "shields of knighthood":

1. King
2. Ecclesiastical princes
3. Lay princes
4. Free lords (freie Herren)
5. Schöffenbarfreie, vassals (Lehnsmänner) of free lords, ministeriales
6. Vassals of Schöffenbarfreie etc.
7. Unnamed

Manorial tenants and burgesses (inhabitants of a borough) were not mentioned.

== Extant copies ==
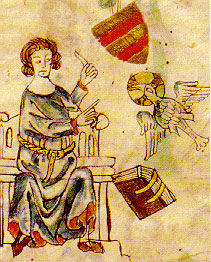
Eike of Repgow, from the Oldenburg Sachsenspiegel

Four (of the original seven) illuminated manuscripts copies are still extant. They are named after their present locations: Heidelberg (Cod. Pal. germ. 164), Oldenburg (Cim I 410), Dresden (Mscr.Dresd.M.32), and Wolfenbüttel (Cod. Guelf. 3.1 Aug. 2°), and date from 1295 to 1371. In total, over 400 versions of the manuscript exist today.

The Dresden manuscript has been described as the "most artistically valuable" by the World Digital Library. It is located in the collection of the Saxon State Library and was created between 1295 and 1363 around Meissen, Germany. This version has 924 illustrations on 92 pages. The illustrations depict about 4,000 people. It suffered water damage after the Bombing of Dresden in World War II and underwent restoration in the 1990s.

An early printed edition of the Sachsenspiegel was produced by Anna Rügerin in Augsburg, dated 22 June 1484. It is the first documented evidence of a woman working as a typographer.

== Proverbs ==
Some German and Dutch proverbs date from the Sachsenspiegel:

- German: Wer zuerst kommt, mahlt zuerst, Dutch: Wie het eerst komt, (die) het eerst maalt (First come, first served, literally: "Who comes first, grinds first"), which is a rule for the order for grinding of corn by a miller and still is being used as a rule of habit at for instance a bakery or box office in Germany and the Netherlands.
- German: Wo der Esel sich wälzt, da muss er Haare lassen, lit. 'Where the donkey rolls, there it sheds hair'. This is a rule for the jurisdiction of courts that still is one of the principles in private international law.

== See also ==
- Germanic tribal laws
- Pleading in English Act 1362, English law mandating use of English instead of French in oral argument in court
- Ordinance of Villers-Cotterêts, 1539, French legislation mandating use of French in law, in place of Latin
- Proceedings in Courts of Justice Act 1730, British law mandating use of English instead of Latin in court writing
