= Giacomo Orsini (cardinal) =

Roman prelate

Giacomo Orsini (c. 1350 – 15 August 1379), also spelled Jacopo Orsini (Latin: Jacobus de Ursinis), was a Roman prelate, the cardinal deacon of San Giorgio in Velabro from 1371 until his death shortly after the start of the Western Schism.

== Early life and education ==
A member of the Orsini family, Giacomo was born around 1350. His mother was Isabella Savelli. His father, Orso Orsini, count of Tagliacozzo and lord of Vicovaro, died in 1360. His brother Rinaldo became count of Tagliacozzo. His uncle, Cardinal Rinaldo Orsini, played a role in Giacomo's upbringing. Pope Urban V gave the young Orsini a canonry in the diocese of Padua in November 1362 and in 1367 appointed him a protonotary apostolic.

Orsini studied canon law at the University of Bologna. He was examined by Giovanni da Legnano and Uguccione da Thiene on 24 May 1371. On 30 May, Pope Gregory XI named him cardinal deacon of San Giorgio in Velabro. The new cardinal received his doctorate in a public ceremony on 2 June.

== Cardinal at Avignon ==
Over the years, Orsini acquired numerous ecclesiastical benefices throughout Europe, including canonries in Elne (1371), Kraków (1371), Utrecht (1374) and York (1374); the archpriestship of Chiusi (1372); the archdeaconries of Leicester (1372), Ely (1373) and Durham (1374); and the deanery of Salisbury (1374). In September 1374, he was named protector of the hospital of Santo Spirito in Sassia in Rome. By September 1376, he was also collector of tithes for England and Sardinia.

Orsini was a cardinal during the last years of the Avignon Papacy. In a consistory on 7 February 1375, he defended the decision of Gregory XI to return to Rome against the arguments of Duke Louis I of Anjou. In July 1376, he was sent ahead to Rome to notify the city of the planned return. He then accompanied Gregory XI from Marseille to Rome in 1376–1377, having made out his will on 20 September 1376 in advance of the journey by sea.

== Conclave of 1378 and the beginning of the Great Schism ==
On the death of Gregory XI, Orsini was a papal candidate, but he was strongly opposed by Cardinal Jean de Cros on account of his youth. Witnesses later claimed that a crowd of onlookers, spurred by members of the Orsini family, was chanting his name at the conclave of 1378. In the end, he was the only cardinal to refuse to vote for Urban VI, but he performed the role of cardinal protodeacon during the papal coronation on 18 April. He placed the tiara on Urban's head because the bishop of Ostia, Pierre d'Estaing, had recently died.

Orsini, with Francesco Tebaldeschi, Pietro Corsini and Simone da Brossano, was part of an Italian faction among the cardinals. When the non-Italian cardinals broke with Urban, claiming they had elected him under pressure from a Roman mob, Urban sent the Italians to negotiate a reconciliation. On 26 July, the Italian cardinals drew up a report (casus) on the election, which was revised by Orsini shortly afterwards. Orsini's draft became the basis for the schismatic cardinals' manifesto of 2 August. During these early negotiations, the Italian cardinals stayed at Vicovaro, aloof from both parties.

Orsini sought legal advice concerning the validity of Urban's election from Giovanni da Legnano, Baldo degli Ubaldi and Bartolomeo da Saliceto, to whom he forwarded his casus. The responses of all three strongly defended Urban VI. Orsini and the other Italians withdrew to Naples, where they were received by Queen Joan I on 30 July. Although present, they did not take part in the counter-conclave at Fondi that elected Antipope Clement VII on 20 September. After this, he withdrew with Cardinals Corsini and Borsano to Tagliacozzo.

Urban VI called Orsini an idiot (sotus). Catherine of Siena also had a low opinion of Orsini. In a letter, she castigates the Italian cardinals in 1378. Already in 1377, when seeking Orsini's intervention to bring an end to the War of the Eight Saints, she had labelled him a "stinking flower" in the church's garden. In the estimation of a modern Jesuit researcher, Marc Dykmans, however, Orsini was "one of the very few who did not lie" in the depositions taken down in 1378 for the monarchs of Spain and recorded in the Libri de Schismate.

Orsini advocated a general council to resolve the burgeoning schism. He died in Tagliacozzo on 15 August 1379 of an ailment of the liver.

== Bibliography ==
- Beattie, Blake (2012). "Catherine of Siena and the Papacy". In Carolyn Muessig; George Ferzoco; Beverly Kienzle (eds.). A Companion to Catherine of Siena. Brill. pp. 73–98.
- Cocks, Terence (1993). "The Archdeacons of Leicester, 1092–1992" (PDF). Transactions of the Leicestershire Archaeological and Historical Society. 67: 27–46. Archived from the original (PDF) on 20 April 2019.
- Dykmans, Marc (1977). "La troisième élection du pape Urbain VI". Archivum Historiae Pontificiae. 15: 217–264. JSTOR 23563814.
- Pio, Berardo (2013). "Orsini, Giacomo". Dizionario Biografico degli Italiani, Volume 79: Nursio–Ottolini Visconti (in Italian). Rome: Istituto dell'Enciclopedia Italiana. ISBN 978-8-81200032-6.
- Rollo-Koster, Joëlle (2009). "Civil Violence and the Initiation of the Schism". In Joëlle Rollo-Koster; Thomas M. Izbicki (eds.). A Companion to the Great Western Schism (1378–1417). Brill. pp. 9–65.
- Thibault, Paul R. (1986). Pope Gregory XI: The Failure of Tradition. University Press of America.
- Ullmann, Walter (1948). The Origins of the Great Schism: A Study in Fourteenth-Century Ecclesiastical History. Burns, Oates & Washbourne.
