= Schwabenspiegel =

13th-century German legal code

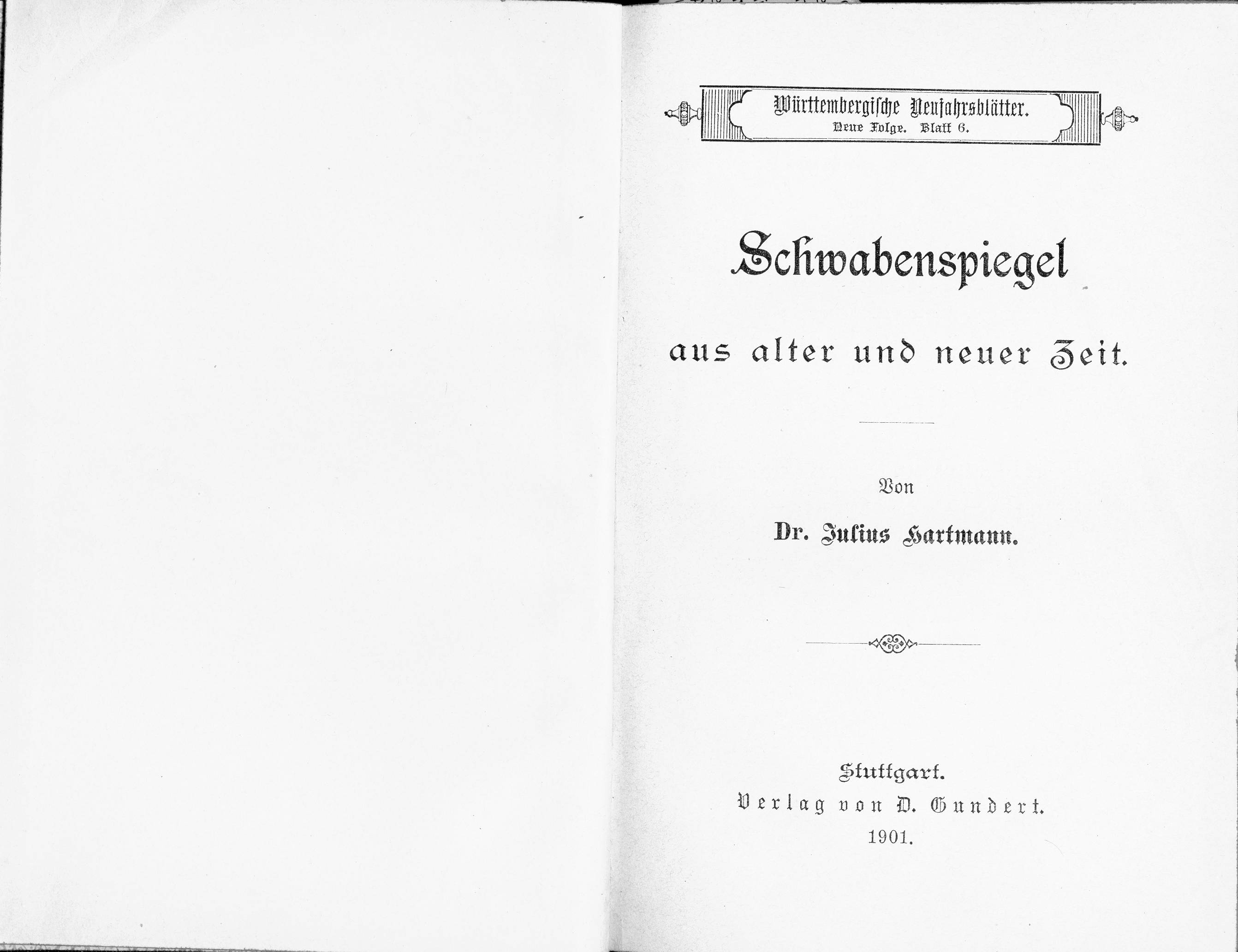
Title page of a 1901 printing

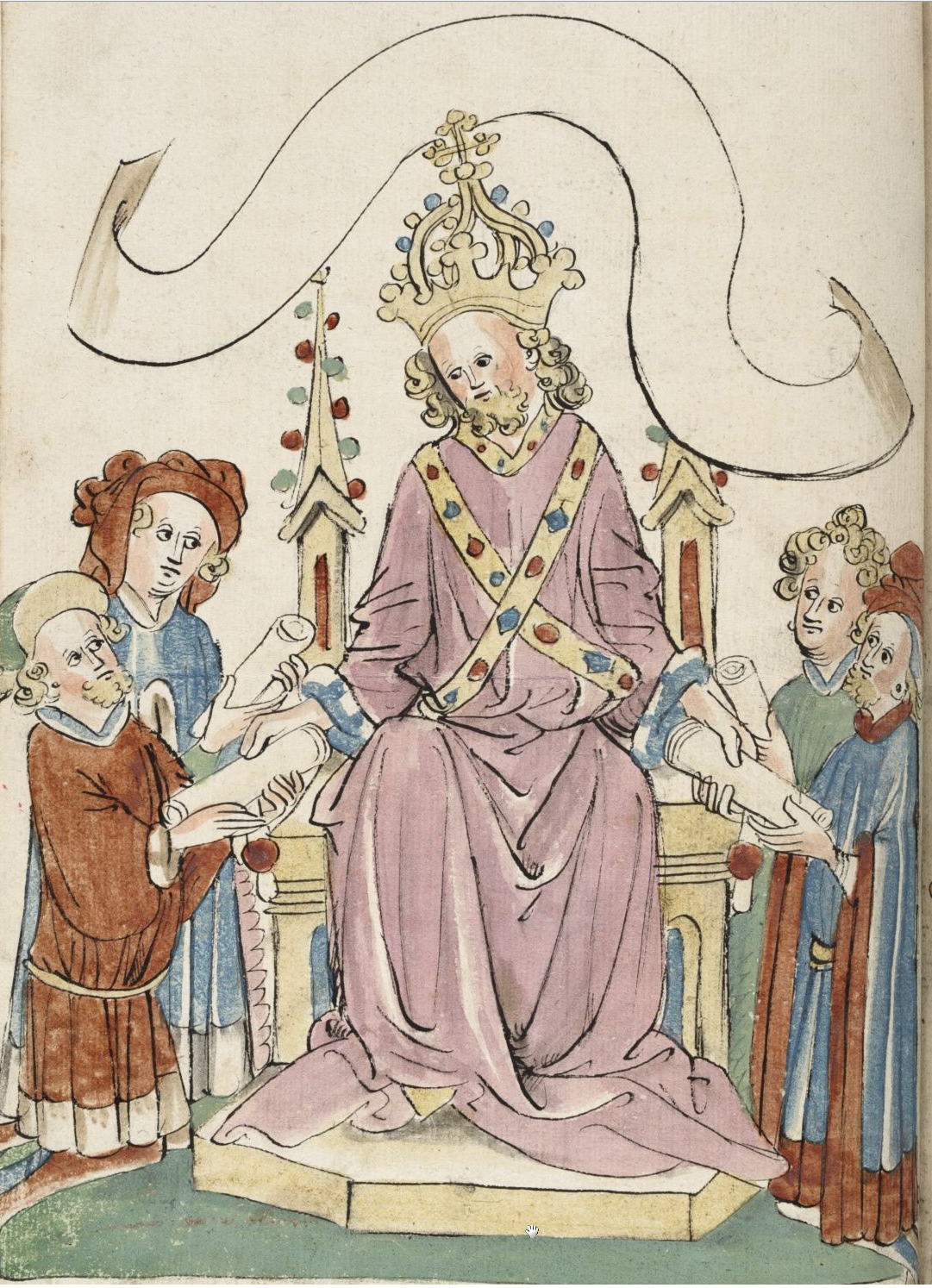
Charlemagne depicted in a 15th-century manuscript of the Schwabenspiegel

The Schwabenspiegel is a legal code, written in ca. 1275 by a Franciscan friar in Augsburg. It deals mainly with questions of land ownership and fiefdom, and it is based on the Pentateuch, Roman law as well as Canon law. Written in Middle High German, it draws on the early 13th century Sachsenspiegel, and is immediately dependent on the Deutschenspiegel code.

The name "mirror of the Swabians" is also taken from the Sachsenspiegel ("mirror of the Saxons"), both metaphorically compared to a mirror in which to perceive right and wrong. Since the code is not prescriptive but descriptive, i.e. it records current legal practice, it does not impose any new laws.

Whereas the Sachsenspiegel recalled Jews as not bearing arms due to being mentioned in the King's peace, the Schwabenspiegel says they were mentioned in the peace due to them not bearing arms.
