= Johannes Klenkok =

German Augustinian friar

Johannes Klenkok (or Klenke) (c. 1310 – 15 June 1374) was a German Augustinian friar, known as a theologian and disciple of Gregory of Rimini.

== Life ==
Klenkok was born in the County of Hoya, part of what is now Lower Saxony, son of a castellan in Thedinghausen. He studied philosophy and theology in Germany with the Augustinians, then took a bachelor's degree at the University of Paris. He was in Bologna from 1342 to 1346.

At the University of Oxford for about four years, from the first half of 1357, Klenkok transmitted the views of Gregory of Rimini. His intention was to oppose the positions of Uthred of Bolton. He was incepted in theology there, in 1359.

== Views and background ==
Klenkok is now known as a critic of aspects of the feudal law and common law traditions. He opposed the Sachsenspiegel, a civil law code applied in parts of Germany in his time. He debated it with Rudolf Block. His work the Decadicon from 1368 to 1369 was an attack on it. Later Klenkok looked for support from the French canonist Pierre de la Vergne, who became a cardinal in 1371. In 1374 Pope Gregory XI issued a bull and condemned 14 articles of the Sachsenspiegel.

Others like Klenkok who put forth a revised version of the views of Gregory of Rimini included Hugolin of Orvieto, Johann Hiltalinger, Angelinus Dobelinus, and Johannes Zacharie. Of these, Dobelinus considered Klenkok his personal teacher. As a commentator at Paris he was in the company of John of Ripa, Facinus de Ast, Michael Aiguani and Andrew of Neufchateau. These writers stood rather apart from the trend of the moderni.

== Editions ==
As of 1999, a modern scholarly edition of his works was lacking.
