= Lefèvre family =

There were various members of the Lefèvre family engaged in tapestry weaving, in Europe of the 17th and 18th centuries. Notable members included Lancelot Lefebvre (Brussels and Antwerp, 1655) and Pierre le Fevre (Paris, 1630).

== Pierre le Fevre ==
In 1647, Pierre was attracted by some offers made him on the part of Henry IV of France, and left Florence for Paris. There he received considerable emoluments, was styled Tapissier to the King, and provided with a workshop in the Garden of the Tuileries. He is known to have gone back to Florence in 1650, but to have returned to Paris five years later; he probably lived in Florence for about ten years, returning there for the last short period of his life. His son Jean, who came with him, does not appear to have ever quit France, and he had the single honour, on the establishment of the Gobelin factory, of directing with Jean Jans the high warp looms. Jans was a Flemish weaver, but had come to Paris to work in the royal buildings in 1654, and he had charge of the largest workshop of the new factory, giving employment to sixty-seven weavers, exclusive of apprentices.

Pierre died in 1669, leaving a son Philip, who was working in Florence in 1677.

== Jean Lefèvre ==
The second workshop, which was erected in the Garden of the Tuileries, was the one conducted by Jean Lefèvre, and he appears to have had full charge of it until 1770, and to have earned for the Government a very large sum of money. The fine tapestry titled "The Toilet of a Princess", which was in the Spitzer collection, was the work of Jean Lefèvre, and three other pieces, representing Bacchanalia, bear his name on their selvedge. One of his major works was titled "The Toilet of Flora", a sheet of tapestry now preserved at the Garde-meuble. Cardinal Mazarin possessed one of his hangings titled "The History of St. Paul", and he was probably largely responsible for the two series titled "The History of Louis XIV", and "The History of Alexander".
