= Jean de la Tour =

French cardinal

Jean of La Tour
- Priest of San Lorenzo in Lucina
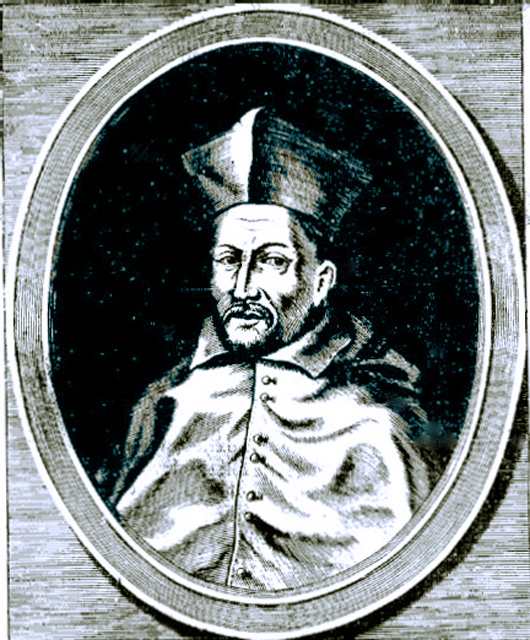
- Previous post: Abbot of Fleury

Orders
- Created cardinal: 30th of May 1371 by Gregory XI

Personal details
- Died: 15th of April 1374 Avignon
- Parents: Bertrand III, Lord of La Tour Isabelle de Lévis

Jean of la Tour (died 15 April 1374) was a French cardinal.

== Life ==
He was the son of Bertrand III, lord of La Tour, and Isabelle de Lévis.

He was the abbot of the Fleury Abbey and was later elected cardinal and priest of San Lorenzo in Lucina on the consistory of the 30th of May 1371 by pope Gregory XI.

He died on the 15th of April 1374 in Avignon.
