= Gérard du Puy =

French cardinal

Gérard du Puy (died 14 February 1389) was a French cardinal of the Roman Catholic Church and cardinal-nephew of Pope Gregory XI.

== Papal legate ==
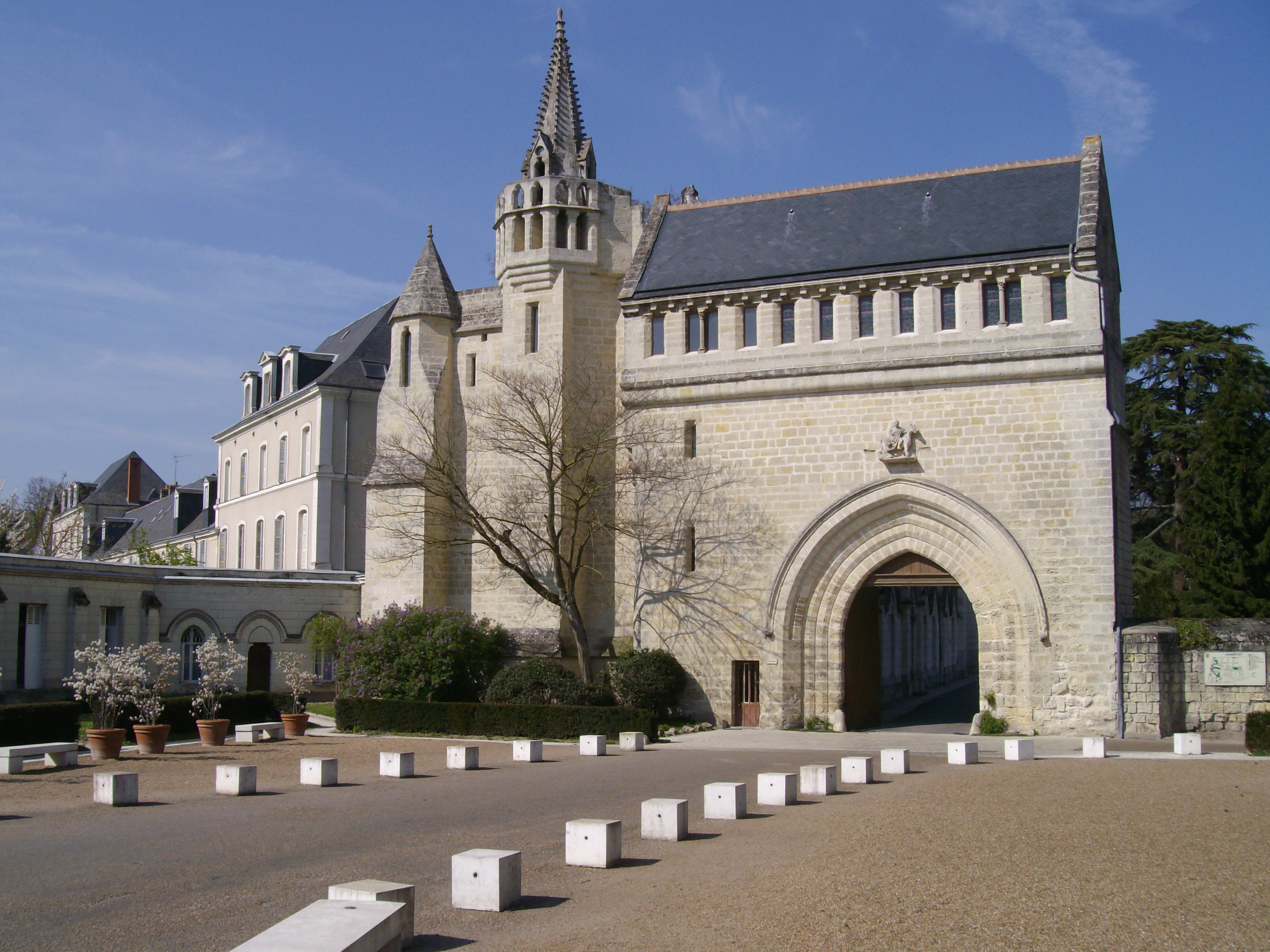
Marmoutier Abbey

In 1372, du Puy, already abbot of Marmoutier (Italian: abate di Monmaggiore) with the diocese of Tours, France, was named Governor of Perugia and Apostolic Nuncio to Tuscany.

Immediately after these appointments, du Puy corresponded with Catharine of Siena on behalf of Gregory XI, and perhaps under the name of Gregory XI. As nuncio, du Puy came into conflict with Florence for supporting the claims of the Salimbeni nobles in Siena. du Puy's support of the Salimbeni also caused hostility toward Perugians in Siena.

== War of the Eight Saints ==
Gregory XI made him cardinal-priest on 20 December 1375, with the title of S. Clemente. Du Puy was the fifth and last relative that Gregory XI created cardinal, after Jean de Murat de Cros (elevated 30 May 1371) and Pierre de la Jugié (elevated 20 December 1375).

He was the abbot of Mormoutier and the papal governor of Perugia during the War of the Eight Saints. He crushed a peasant uprising in 1371 and constructed a citadel on Sole Hill described by contemporary chroniclers as "the finest fortress in Italy", which took three and a half years to build. Circa 1373, du Puy destroyed the three papal tombs in the Perugia Cathedral (of Pope Innocent III, Pope Urban IV, and Pope Martin IV). As governor, du Puy also looted the construction site of the new Duomo, demolished the ancient campanile and the chapel of St. John the Baptist, all for construction material for his Fortezza di Porte Sole linked to the Palazzo dei Priori.

He was expelled by a popular uprising in 1375, and his fortification of Porta Sole was razed to the ground. He had been forced to retreat to the citadel (guarded by Bernard de La Salle) along with his military entourage led by William Gold, who had been sent ahead by condottiere John Hawkwood, after crowds gathered in the town chanting "death to the abbot and the pastors of the church."

Hawkwood waited outside Perugia and camped across the Ponte di San Giovanni with 300 lances while the citizens of Perugia plowed up the roads leading to the citadel and bombarded it with a trebuchet, built by Florentine craftsman Domenico Bonintende, nicknamed cacciaprete (the "priest chaser"), which was said to throw fifteen hundred pound stones, according to local sources, as well as excrement and live animals. Du Puy surrendered on 22 December 1375 and was handed over to Hawkwood's custody on the day after Christmas, only to be escourted to Cesena as prisoner where he was left in the custody of Galeotto I Malatesta, the lord of Rimini. Hawkwood leveraged du Puy to receive 130,000 florins in backpay from the pope.

== Later life ==
After the death of his uncle, Gregory XI, on 26 March 1378, du Puy participated in the papal conclave from 7–9 April 1378 that elected Pope Urban VI, but was among the cardinals—mostly French, but also some Italian—who left the court of Urban VI for Anagni, then Fondi, and then on 20 September 1378, elected Robert of Geneva as Clement VII. Du Puy remained in the allegiance of Avignon Pope Clement VII until his death on 14 February 1389.
