= Pierre de la Vergne =

Pierre de la Vergne, a.k.a. Pierre de Veruche, Pierre Verneyo, Pierre Veruco, Pierre Verrujo or Pierre Veroche, Latin Petrus de Vernio (died 6 October 1403 in Avignon) was a French cardinal.

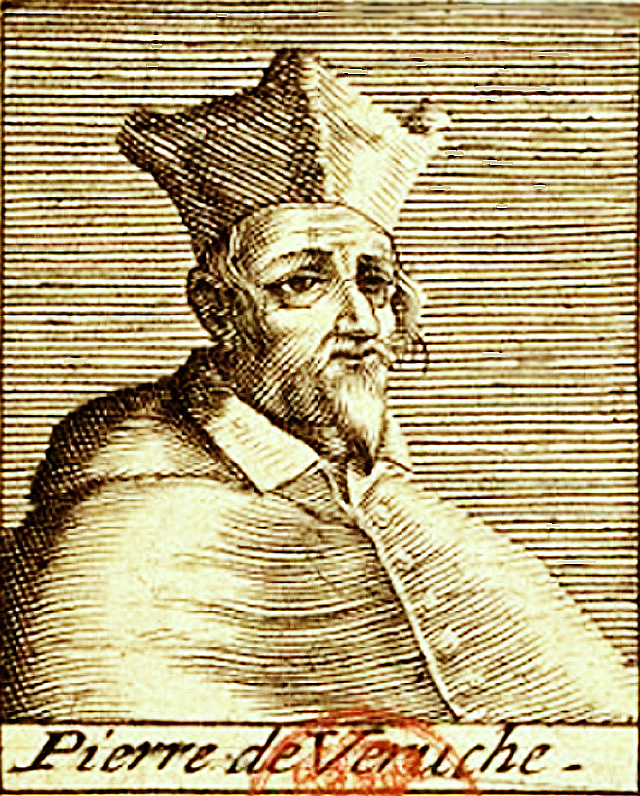
Engraving of de la Vergne

== Life ==
Pierre de la Vergne studied Canon law at the University of Montpellier. He was a disciple of Johannes Klenkok and was appointed cardinal deacon by Pope Gregory XI in 1371 taking the titular church Santa Maria in Via Lata.

During the conflict about the Sachsenspiegel law book he handed the Decadicon - a written attack by Johannes Klenkok on the Sachsenspiegel - to Pope Gregory XI. Gregory considered the attack and later issued the papal bull Salvator humani generis condemning 14 articles of the Sachsenspiegel on 8 April 1374.

De la Vergne participated in the papal conclave 1378 during which Pope Urban VI was elected and later in 1378 in the papal conclave that elected Antipope Clement VII. In 1379 he joined the Roman Obedience together with the other French cardinals.

== Bibliography ==
- André Duchesne, Histoire de tous les cardinaux françois, II, pp. 633–634
- Lars Rentmeister: Das Verhältnis zwischen Staat und Kirche im späten Mittelalter am Beispiel der Diskussion um den Sachsenspiegel. Freie Universität Berlin, Berlin 2016, Dissertation FU Berlin 2016, 473 pages Volltext online PDF, 59,63 MB), pp. 265 ff.
