= Jean de Murat de Cros =

French cardinal

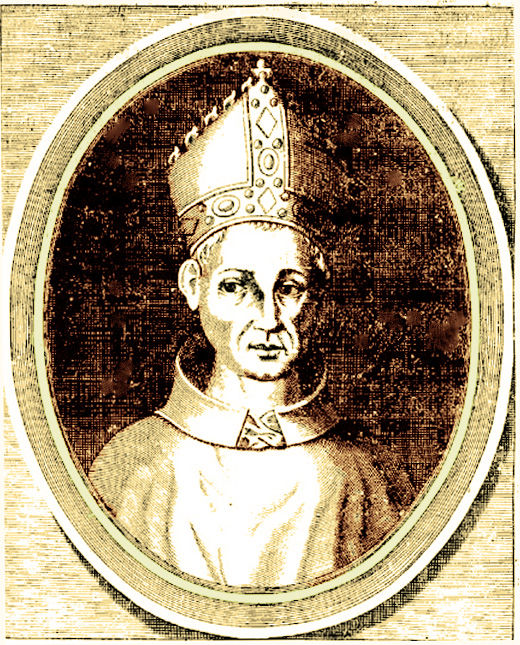
Jean de Murat de Cros

Jean de Murat du Cros was a French cardinal of the Catholic Church. He became the Bishop of Limoges (1347–1371). He was a leader in what became the Great Schism within Western Christianity.

He was born on an unknown date in the Chateau of Calimafort, in the Province of Limousin, the son of Aymar de Murat de Cros, a nobleman of Auvergnat extraction, and of Marie de Montclar. His brother was Pierre de Murat de Cros who became a monk and later the Archbishop of Arles.

Murat de Cros obtained a doctorate in the law and received Holy Orders, after which he became the prior of a community of secular canons serving a rural church in the Archdiocese of Bourges.

Shortly after a relative was elected as Pope Gregory XI, Murat de Cros became the new pope's cardinal-nephew and was made cardinal-priest of the Basilica of Santi Nereo e Achilleo on 30 May 1371. Then, he became grand penitentiary (1373) and cardinal-bishop of Palestrina (28 September 1376). His brother became the head of the Papal Treasury, in which office he administered the finances of the Holy See.

After the death of Pope Gregory, Murat de Cros initially supported the election of Pope Urban VI in the subsequent papal conclave during April 1378. Shortly thereafter, however, under the leadership of his brother, he adhered to the obedience of Antipope Clement VII and served as his legate in France.

He died in Avignon on 21 November 1383 and was buried in the cathedral there.

== See also ==
- Pierre de Murat de Cros
