= Francesco Maidalchini =

Italian Catholic cardinal (1631–1700)

His Eminence Francesco Maidalchini
- Cardinal-Priest of Santa Prassede
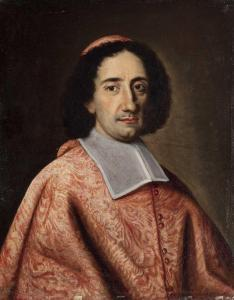
- Church: Roman Catholic
- In office: 1691–1700
- Previous posts: Cardinal-Priest of Santa Maria in Via (1689–91); Cardinal-Deacon of Santa Maria in Via Lata (1666–89); Cardinal-Deacon of Santa Maria in Campitelli (1654–66); Cardinal-Deacon of San Pancrazio (1653–54); Cardinal-Deacon of Sant'Adriano al Foro (1647–53)

Orders
- Ordination: 1689
- Created cardinal: 7 October 1647 by Pope Innocent X
- Rank: Cardinal-Priest

Personal details
- Born: 12 April 1621 Viterbo, Papal States
- Died: 13 June 1700 (aged 79) Nettuno, Papal States
- Buried: Sant'Eustachio
- Coat of arms

Francesco Maidalchini (21 April 1631 – 13 June 1700) was an Italian Cardinal of the Roman Catholic Church.

== Early life ==
Maidalchini was born 12 April 1631 in Viterbo, the son of Andrea Maidalchini and Pacifica Feliziani. His father was the brother of Olimpia Maidalchini; sister-in-law of Pope Innocent X. Anti-Catholic publicist Gregorio Leti described Francesco Maidalchini as a person "with no experience in the things of the world, ignorant in letters and incapable of learning".

He was named commendatory abbot of St. Martin and St. Gaudentius of Rimini and San Pancrazio outside the walls of Rome. He also received the title of Canon of St. Peter's Basilica in Rome.

== Cardinal-nephew ==
In 1647, Maidalchini's first cousin, Camillo Francesco Maria Pamphili, resigned his post as Cardinal-Nephew to marry and Innocent X required a new Cardinal Nephew. Without any remaining male relative to turn to for an assistant, Innocent X was persuaded to appointed the seventeen-year-old Francesco, his sister-in-law's nephew. Upon being elevated to Cardinal, he was installed as Cardinal-Deacon of Sant'Adriano al Foro. Many of the responsibilities of the Cardinal-nephew had been previously delegated to the Secretary of State, Cardinal Giovanni Giacomo Panciroli, with the military duties assigned to the husbands of the Pope's two nieces. It is possible that the pontiff meant simply to install a relative, however distant, in the Sacred College, without this implying an effective delegation of powers. Without adequate political knowledge for the role, Francesco was assisted by Cardinals Panciroli and Domenico Cecchini, but he nonetheless remained in a substantially weak political position. The Pope's sisters and other members of the Pamphilj family begrudged his close association with the pontiff and shunned the "adopted" nephew.

Girolamo Gigli wrote that Francesco's paternal aunt, Olimpia required him to reside with her at the Palazzo Pamphili in Piazza Navona rather than in the papal palaces, so as "not to lose her dominion", and to prevent his making independent decisions. However, it was immediately clear that the new Cardinal-nephew would not have enjoyed any real power. Innocent X continued to entrust the politically relevant affairs to Secretary of State Cardinal Panciroli. During his brief tenure as Cardinal-nephew, Cardinal Maidalchini was universally evaluated in a negative way by diplomatic observers, who saw in some of his misguided initiatives the hand of his aunt.

In December 1649, Maidalchini obtained the privilege of opening the Holy Door at the Basilica di Santa Maria Maggiore, despite not yet having been ordained a priest. The incident caused considerable confusion, compounded by a dispute with the canons of the basilica for possession of the walled medals in the holy door.

He proved so incompetent, that in 1650, despite Olimpia Maidalchini's objections, Francesco was replaced by Camillo Astalli. Although a distant relative by marriage to Olimpia, Astalli had in fact been recommended by his mentor, the Secretary of State. Having blamed Olimpia for his disgrace, Francesco became her bitter enemy.

== Later ecclesiastic career ==
In 1653, Maidalchini was appointed Cardinal-Deacon of San Pancrazio. In 1654, he was appointed Cardinal-Deacon of the Church of Santa Maria in Portico and the following year, following the death of his "uncle", he participated in the papal conclave of 1655 which elected Pope Alexander VII. His aunt Olimpia died in 1657.

After only 8 years with Maidalchini as Cardinal-Deacon, the church of Santa Maria was in ruins and without income. Its deaconry was suppressed by Pope Alexander VII and the building was pulled down. Maidalchini was transferred (in title at least) to the newer Santa Maria in Campitelli, built by Carlo Rainaldi between 1659 and 1667.

Contemporary John Bargrave leaves little doubt that Maidalchini was not much respected either by the College of Cardinals or the general public of Rome. Bargrave describes Maidalchini as, "being within an inch of an idiot" and recounts that the ladies of one congregation could not help but laugh at the appearance of a teenager in cardinal's vestments. Maidalchini's could not contain himself and broke into laughter in response. Bargrave also recalled his run-in with a gentleman who kindly pointed out that the book the cardinal was reading was, in fact, upside down (Bargrave suggests Maidalchini was nearly illiterate).

In 1666, Maidalchini was transferred to the deaconry of Santa Maria in Via Lata, which was customarily assigned to the senior Cardinal-Deacon, although it was only in 1669 when he assumed this position in the Sacred College. He participated in the conclave of 1667 which elected Pope Clement IX, the conclave of 1669-1670 which elected Pope Clement X, the conclave of 1676 which elected Pope Innocent XI and the conclave of 1689 which elected Pope Alexander VIII. As cardinal protodeacon, he announced the elections of the popes Clement X, Innocent XI and Alexander VIII and celebrated the rites of their coronations.

Later that year, he was ordained as a priest and was appointed Cardinal-Priest of the Church of Santa Maria in Via. In accordance with the bull Postquam verus of Sixtus V (3 December 1586), he assumed the position of protopriest of the College of Cardinals. He participated in the conclave of 1691 which elected Pope Innocent XII and became Cardinal-Priest of the Church of Santa Prassede later that same year.

== Political attitude ==
In the political rivalry between France and Spain, Maidalchini initially aligned himself with Spain. However, leaders of Spanish faction at Rome showed him so little respect that he eventually changed the side. In the papal conclave of 1655, he was still counted among the members of Spanish party, but subsequently became one of the most faithful adherents of the Kingdom of France in the College of Cardinals.

== Death ==
Maidalchini died on 13 June 1700 at Nettuno. His funeral took place on 15 June 1700 in the church of Sant'Eustachio in Rome, where he was buried.
