= Cardinal Piccolomini =

Cardinal Piccolomini may refer to:

- Enea Silvio Piccolomini, cardinal-priest of Santa Sabina from 1456, became Pope Pius II (r. 1458–1464)
- Francesco Piccolomini, cardinal-deacon of San Eustachio from 1460, became Pope Pius III (r. 1503)
- Giovanni Piccolomini (1475–1537), cardinal from 1517
- Celio Piccolomini (1609–1681), cardinal-priest of San Pietro in Montorio from 1664
