= Olimpia Maidalchini =

Italian noblewoman (1591–1657)

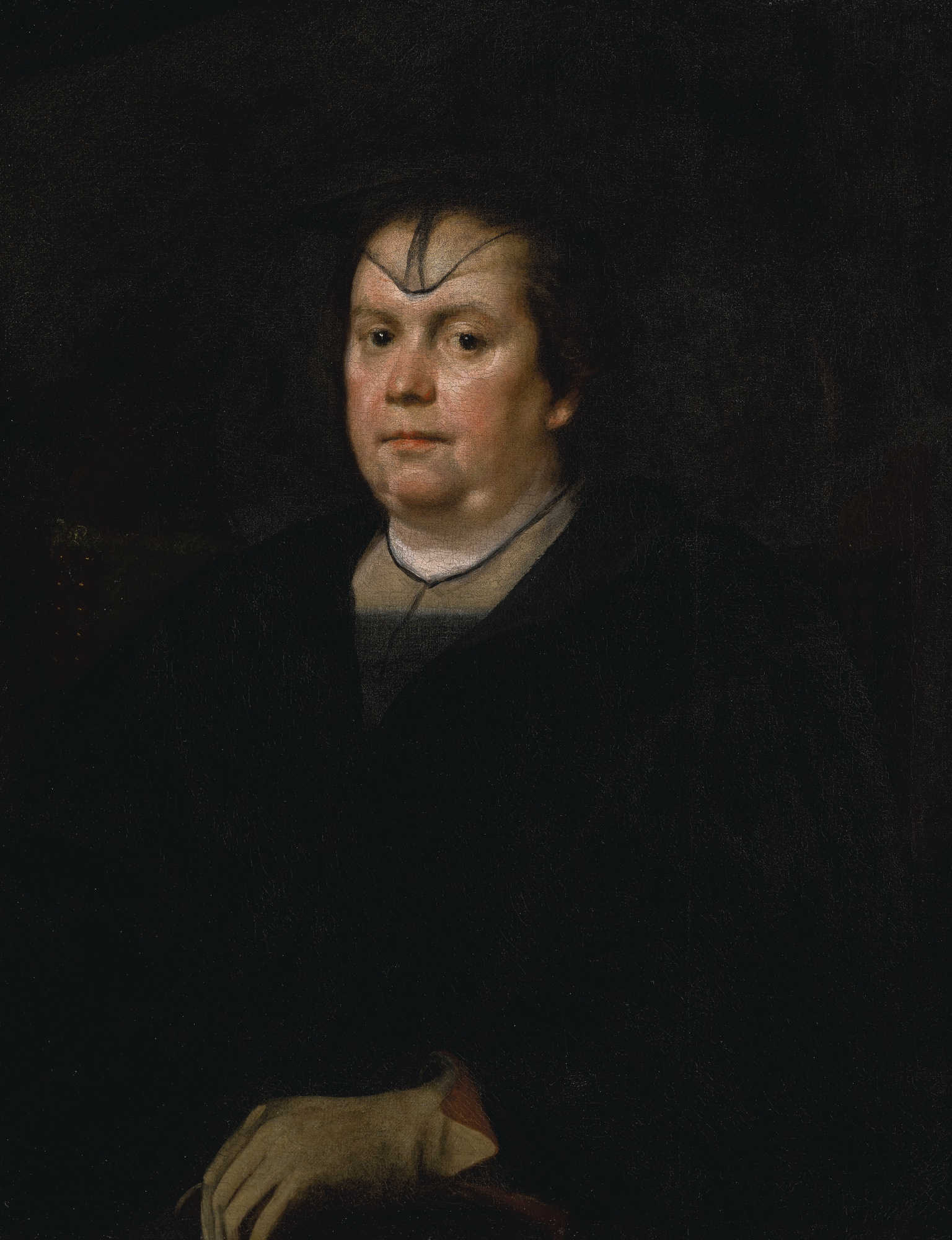
- Contemporary portrait by Diego Velázquez
- Born: 26 May 1591; Viterbo, Papal States
- Died: 27 September 1657 (aged 66); San Martino al Cimino, Papal States

Olimpia Maidalchini Pamphilj, Princess of San Martino (26 May 1591 – 27 September 1657), (also spelled Pamphili and known as Olimpia Pamphili), was the sister-in-law of Pope Innocent X (Pamphili). She was perceived by her contemporaries as having influence regarding papal appointments.

She is not to be confused with her daughter-in-law Olimpia Aldobrandini, who married her son Camillo.

== Early life ==
Coat of arms of the Maidalchini family, part of the Italian nobility

Maidalchini was born in Viterbo, the eldest of three daughters of Sforza Maidalchini (1561–1623), a condottiere, by his second wife, Vittoria Gualterio, patrician of Orvieto and Rome. Her mother Vittoria was a noble of Viterbo, the daughter of Giulio Gualterio (who was the son of Sebastiano Gualterio, Bishop of Viterbo, and Papal Nuncio to France and the Council of Trent).

Her family was noble, but only moderately wealthy. In order to conserve the family property for his only son Andrea, Sforza Maidalchini decided that his daughters should enter religious life, where the dowry to enter a convent was less than that required for a suitable marriage. Olimpia refused, and in 1608 married Paolo Nini, one of the wealthiest men in Viterbo. Their two children both died in infancy and Nini himself died in 1611 at the age of twenty-three.

Her second marriage was to Pamphilio Pamphili, elder brother of Cardinal Giambattista Pamphili, the future Pope Innocent X. The Cardinal had been appointed nuncio to the Kingdom of Naples, and Pamphilio and his wife joined him, living in a home adjacent to the nunciature. Their son, Camillo Francesco Maria Pamphili was born in Naples on 21 February 1622.

Upon their return from Naples, the brothers shared the ancestral family palace between Piazza Navona and Piazza Pasquino, constructed around the original nucleus of the building purchased by the first Paphiljs when they arrived from Gubbio. The separate wings of the palace accommodated both the cardinal's court and the residence for the eldest's family.

== Cardinal-nephews ==
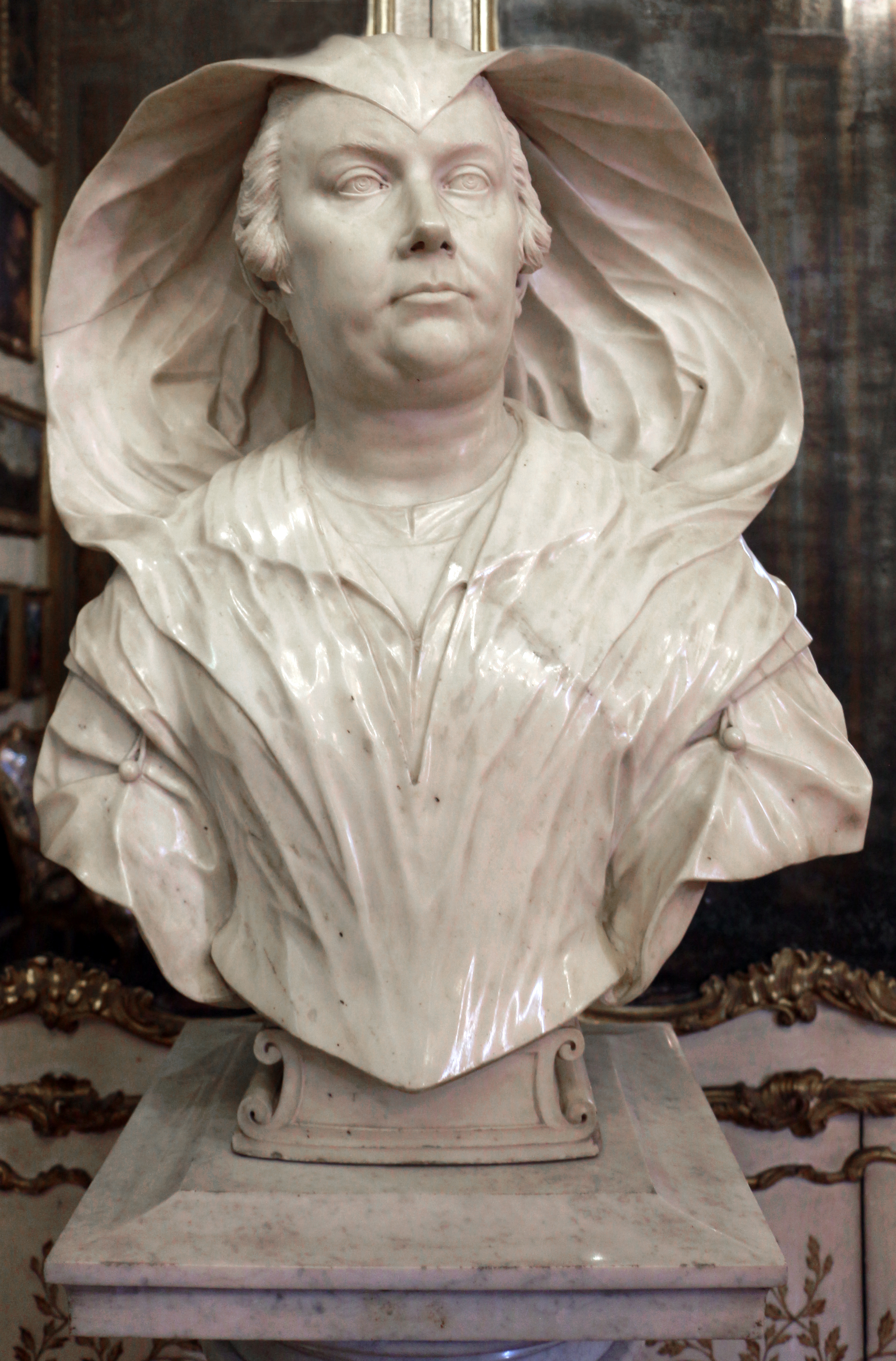
Her bust by Alessandro Algardi

After Pamphilio died in 1639, Cardinal Pamphilj became head of the family. He and Olimpia deliberated the prospect of a marriage for her son, Camillo, to perpetuate the lineage, preferably a marriage that would also be politically advantageous.

In September 1644 Cardinal Pamphilj was elected pope, taking the name Innocent X. As a pope generally found the curial bureaucracy occupied by entrenched appointees of his predecessor, it was common practice to appoint a trusted relative to oversee the administration.

Soon after his election, Innocent elevated his late brother's son, Camillo to the office of Cardinal-nephew. At the same time he redistributed some of the responsibilities of the office to the Cardinal Secretary of State, Giovanni Giacomo Panciroli, with the military duties assigned to Andrea Giustiniani and Niccolò Ludovisi who had married Innocent's nieces, Maria Flaminia and Costanza.

According to Theodoro Ameyden, by 1646 the pope was again thinking of arranging a marriage for his nephew, the only male heir of the Roman Pamphilj, and at this point there reappeared on the horizon the possibility of a marriage alliance with the influential Barberini family. However, on 21 January 1647, Camillo renounced the cardinalate to marry Olimpia Aldobrandini, the grand-niece of Pope Clement VIII and widow of Paolo Borghese, on 10 February.

== Influence ==
Donna Olimpia Maidalchini is a woman of great spirit, but her sole title to influence is that of a rigid economist. When offices fell vacant at court, nothing was decided without her good pleasure; when church livings were to be distributed, the ministers of the dataria had orders to defer all appointments until, notice having been given to her of the nature of those benefices, she might then select such as best pleased her for her own disposal; if episcopal sees were to be conferred, it was to her that the candidates applied; and that which most effectually revolted every upright mind was to see that those were preferred who were most liberal in giving.

— Cavalier Giustiniani, 1652

Innocent then appointed seventeen-year-old Francesco Maidalchini to the now reduced office of Cardinal-nephew. Francesco was the son of Andrea Maidalchini (1584–1649), Olimpia's half-brother. Olimpia apparently attempted to influence her nephew's decisions; however, he proved so incompetent that in 1650 Innocent X sought a replacement.

Camillo Astalli belonged to a noble but relatively poor family from Sambuci. He is often mentioned as a cousin of Olimpia Maidalchini. The connection is through the marriage of his brother to Olimpia's niece, Catherine Maidalchini Tiberius. Asalli studied at the Roman College, and in 1640, graduated from the Sapienza with a doctorate in civil and ecclesiastical law. He then began a career as a consistorial lawyer. Olimpia was apparently instrumental in obtaining an appointment for Astalli as secretary to the Secretary of State, Cardinal Giovanni Giacomo Panciroli. Panciroli then became Astalli's mentor.

When Francesco Maidalchini proved to be a failure as Cardinal-nephew, Innocent sought the advice of his Cardinal Secretary of State, and Cardinal Panciroli suggested Astalli. Astalli was elevated to Cardinal on 19 September 1650 by the Pope, who simultaneously adopted him into the Pamphili family (as Camillo Astalli-Pamphili) and appointed him Cardinal-Nephew. Innocent also presented him with a substantial income, the Palazzo Pamphili in Piazza Navona and the villa outside the Porta San Pancrazio.

The pope's generosity, however, provoked the ire of the Pamphili family, especially Donna Olimpia. Panciroli and Astalli incurred their unrelenting hostility. Plagued with constant attacks and ill health, Panciroli died 3 September 1651. Faced with the hostility of Donna Olimpia and the Pamphiljs, Astalli sought a new patron in King Philip IV of Spain.

Cardinal Decio Azzolino was assistant to Panciroli; Olimpia Maidalchini acted as his patron. Azzolino managed the Secretariat until the return from Germany of Bishop Fabio Chigi, who was named Secretary of State in December. Azzolino was also a skilled cryptographer and investigator. When the Kingdom of Naples was made aware of invasion plans by Henry II, Duke of Guise, Azzolino concluded in February 1654, that the breach must have come from the Cardinal-nephew Astalli. Astalli was dismissed and sent away from Rome.

== Titles ==
Like other Popes of the same era, Pope Innocent X, as Monarch of the Papal States, bestowed royal titles on some of his closest confidants and family. On 7 October 1645, Maidalchini received the honorific title, Princess of San Martino, effectively turning the small enclave of San Martino al Cimino into her personal principality. The title came with no more power or responsibility than that which she already held as Pamphili matriarch.

== Decline ==
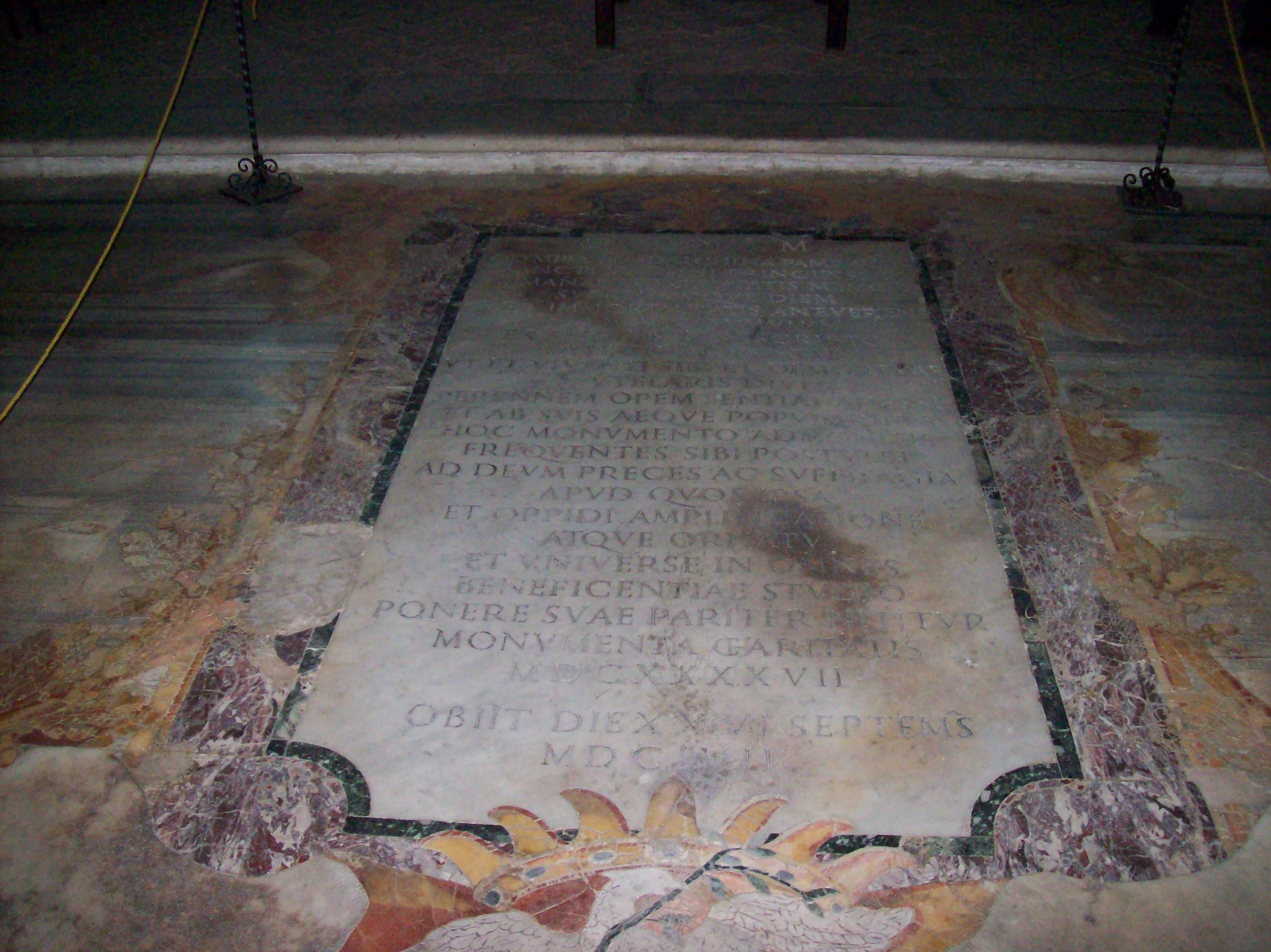
Her tomb in Viterbo

Maidalchini's influence waned after Innocent X recalled Fabio Chigi from Germany, made him secretary of state and subsequently a cardinal on 10 February 1652. Chigi succeeded Innocent X as Pope Alexander VII. After the death of Pope innocent X in January 1655, Olimpia Maidalchini retired to San Martino al Cimino in Viterbo, where she died in 1657.

According to papal historian Ludwig von Pastor, "the misfortune of Pope Pamphili was that the only person in his family who would have had the qualities necessary to fill such a position was a woman."

== Legacy ==
As the widow of Paolo Nini, Olimpia Maidalchini brought considerable wealth to the house of Pamphilj, and as the Pamphilj matron she managed much of the family's possessions. Innocent respected the fact that she chose not to remarry after the death of his brother. In 1645 the Venetian ambassador reported, "She is a lady of great prudence and worth; she understands the position she holds as sister-in-law to the pope; she enjoys the esteem and affection of his holiness; and has great influence with him."

The eighty-year-old pontiff's health began to decline in August 1654. Master of Ceremonies, Fulvio Servantio, who was in constant attendance during the last days of Pope Innocent, recorded in the Ceremonial Diary an account of the death, funeral, and burial of the pope, which accorded with the standard practice concerning any other seventeenth century pope.

By the evening of 26 December his condition had deteriorated to the extent that the family was summoned. In anticipation of the Pope's expected death many of the cardinals had already gathered in Rome in advance of a subsequent conclave. Innocent X received the last rites on 28 December, and expressing a wish to take leave of the cardinals, thirty-nine gathered at his bedside at the Quirinal Palace. Secretary of State Chigi, who had been in attendance during the last twelve days, Prefect of the Sacred Palace Bishop Scotti, and Sacristan Monsignor Altini, as well as, various attendants were present when the Pope died on the night of 6 January 1655.

The Swiss Guard escorted Papal Camerlengo Cardinal Antonio Barberini to the Quirinal to perform the requisite rituals and Cardinal de Medici visited with the Pope's three nephews, who were in another room. After an autopsy, the body was embalmed and the next day taken to the Vatican where it was placed on a catafalque in the Sistine Chapel. On 8 January it was transferred to St. Peter's Basilica, where the sealing of the coffin was witnessed by Cardinals Ludovisi, Chigi, Omodeo, Ottoboni, Santacroce, Aldobrandini, Vidman, Raggi, Pio and Gualtieri, Princes Pamphili, Ludovisi and Giustiniani, and the Master of Ceremonies Fulvio Servantio. A funeral held on 17 January. Innocent's tomb is located in the Church of Sant'Agnese in Agone which he had built in 1652 adjacent to the family palace, the Palazzo Pamphili, in Rome.

=== Legends ===
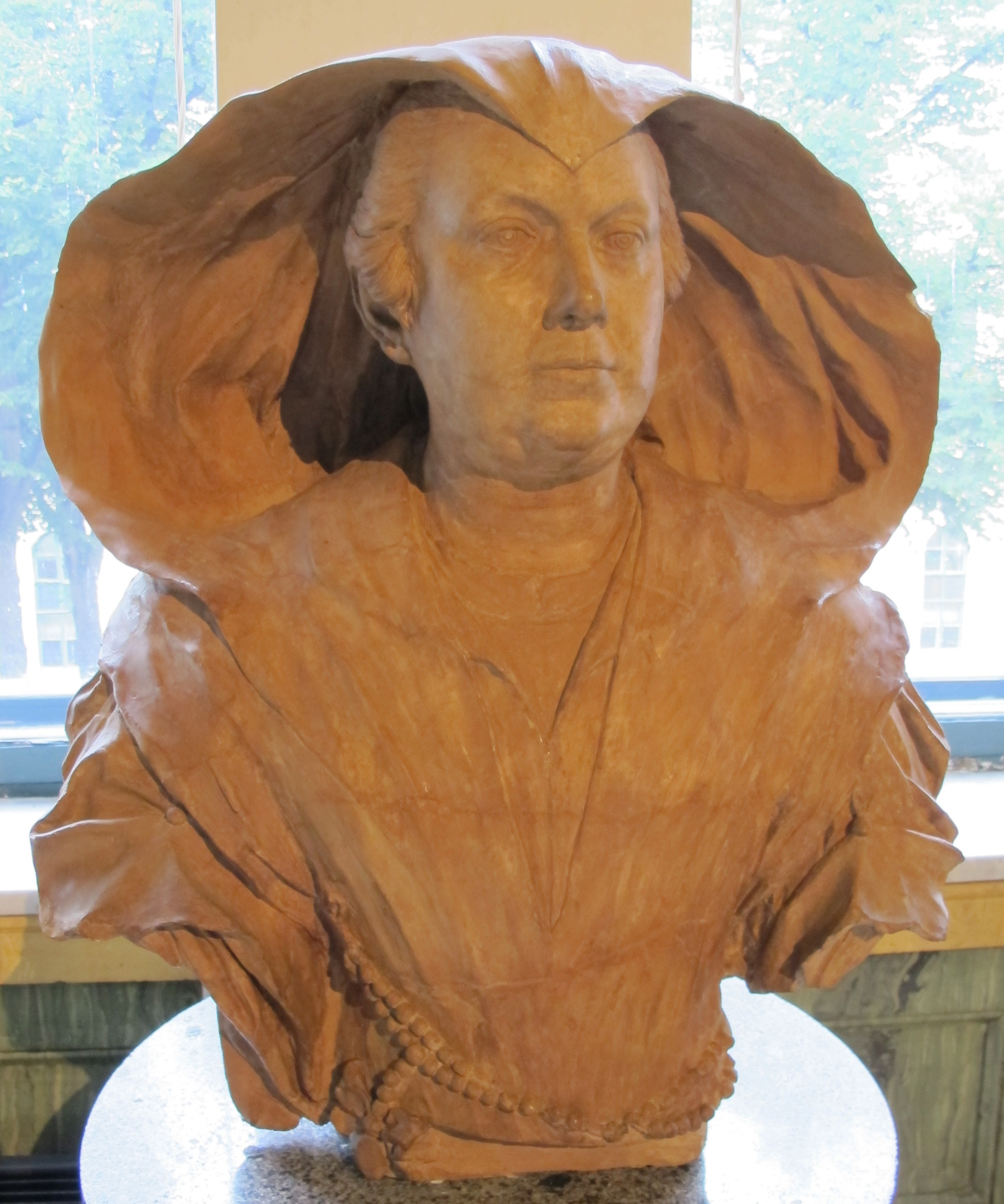
Algardi's bust of Maidalchini; terracotta version in the Hermitage Museum

The anti-Catholic publicist Gregorio Leti wrote that

During the last year of the pope's life, Olimpia Maidalchini scarcely ever left his side, completely controlling access to the Pope and to the money she could make and power she could wield through him. In the last weeks of his life, it was said, she would lock him in his room once a week while she removed money and other valuables from the Papal Palace to her own palace. Even with his death she did not flee the inevitable retribution, believing that she could produce a friendly result in the conclave through the exercise of influence and money. ...The dead pope she left to his own fate, not even providing him a proper coffin for his lying-in-state.

Archbishop Austin Dowling characterizes Leti's "anti-papal histories of conclaves" as "mendacious and inexact". Nonetheless, Leti's account was subsequently repeated and widely disseminated by later historians and writers such as T.A. Trollope who recognized that Leti's "...inexactitude as an historian is notorious," yet reported that the body of the pope was completely abandoned for three days. A story repeated by Eleanor Herman.

Leopold von Ranke, who took pride in drawing on primary sources, used Leti's works. Ranke's work was very popular in the 19th century, but his approach was later challenged as naïve.

Maidalchini's reputation can be seen in her unflattering bust by Alessandro Algardi (circa 1650), currently in the Doria Pamphili Gallery. Maidalchini was notorious for guarding access to Innocent X, and utilizing it to her own financial benefit. Her wired widow's hood in the bust was interpreted by Ann Sutherland as a jab at the fact that neither Maidalchini nor her family provided for the burial of Innocent X after his death in 1655, which was paid for by Innocent X's former butler.

Eleanor Herman says that Olimpia locked the Pope alone in his chamber on the night from 26 to 27 December and she went to her palace in fear that the Pope died that night and that her palace was sacked and burned. The morning of the 27th, she was barred access to Innocent X's chamber, much to her chagrin since she was expecting to steal the two chests full of gold that were hidden under Innocent's bed. Right after Innocent's body was removed on 29 December, she entered the chamber, removed the chests, and then ran to her palace to lock herself in fear of what angry mobs could do to her. Olimpia allowed the pontiff's body to stay unburied for three days, and to be buried in "the simplest of forms imaginable". claiming that she was a poor widow that couldn't arrange a proper burial.

Some historians describe Innocent X as "entirely under the control" of Maidalchini. This legacy is tied up in the accounts of the Roman Pasquinade as well as French (Innocent X had shunned France in favor of Spain and Protestant sources. The Catholic Encyclopedia refers to Maidalchini as the "great blemish" on the pontificate of the "blameless" Innocent X, whom it styles a "lover of justice." Maidalchini is sometimes referred to as "the papessa" ("lady pope"), a variant of a title also applied to Pasqualina Lehnert (confidant of Pope Pius XII), and (the legendary) Pope Joan. Some sources even allege that Maidalchini was Innocent X's lover, an accusation which goes back to Gregorio Leti's Vita di Donna Olimpia Maidalchini (1666), written under the pseudonym Gualdus, and that she poisoned cardinals (with the help of her pharmacist, Exili) to open up additional vacancies for simony. German historian Leopold von Ranke concluded that she was not Innocent X's lover.
