= Camillo Astalli =

Italian Catholic Cardinal

His Eminence Camillo Astalli-Pamphilj
- Archbishop of Catania
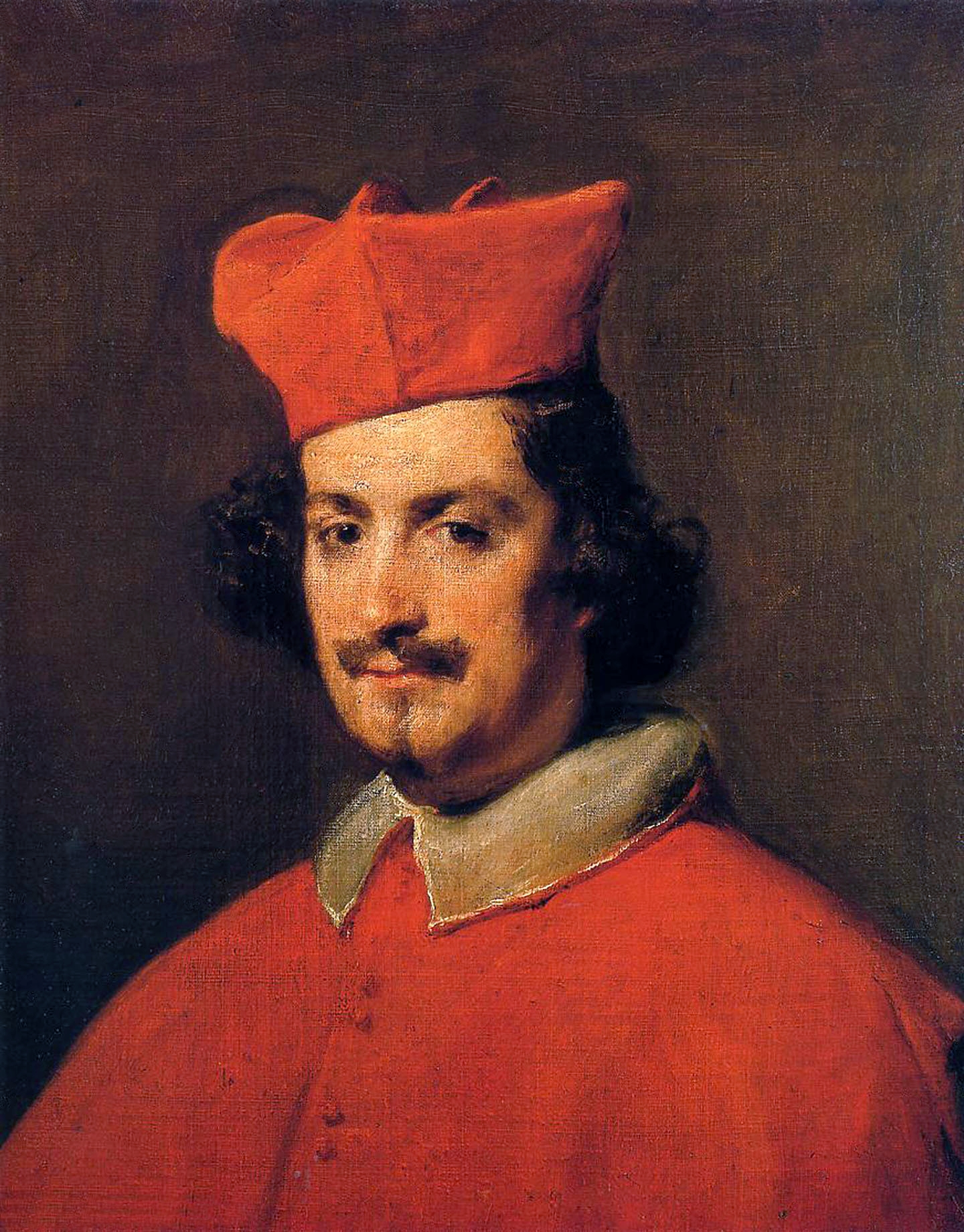
- Portrait by Diego Velázquez, 1650 (Hispanic Society, New York)
- Church: Catholic Church
- In office: 1661-1663
- Predecessor: Marco Antonio Gussio
- Successor: Michelangelo Bonadies
- Other post: Cardinal-Priest of San Pietro in Montorio
- Previous posts: Camerlengo of the Sacred College of Cardinals (1661–1662)

Orders
- Consecration: 25 July 1661 by Federico Sforza
- Created cardinal: 19 September 1650 by Pope Innocent X
- Rank: Cardinal-Priest

Personal details
- Born: 1619 Rome, Papal States
- Died: 21 December 1663 (aged 43–44) Catania, Sicily

Camillo Astalli (21 October 1616 – 21 December 1663) was an Italian Catholic Cardinal and Cardinal-Nephew of Pope Innocent X who served as Cardinal Priest of San Pietro in Montorio (1653–1662), Camerlengo of the Sacred College of Cardinals (1661–1662), and Archbishop (personal title) of Catania (1661–1663).

== Early life ==
Camillo Astalli belonged to a noble but relatively poor family. He was born in Sambuci, at Tivoli, 21 October 1616 to Fulvio and Catherine Pinelli Astalli. He studied at the Roman College and in 1640 graduated from the Sapienza with a doctorate in civil and ecclesiastical law, commencing a career as a consistorial lawyer. Following his brother's marriage to Catherine Maidalchini Tiberius, the niece of Olimpia Maidalchini, sister-in-law of Pope Innocent X, he began his rise in the church hierarchy. (From this a number of records refer to Maidalchini as his cousin.)

He became the assistant to the Secretary of State, Cardinal Giovanni Giacomo Panciroli, who proposed him for the post of cardinal-nephew, which had been left vacant in 1647 by the resignation of the Cardinal Camillo Pamphilj.

== Ecclesiastic career ==
When first elected to the papal throne, Pope Innocent X had appointed his nephew, Camillo Pamphili as his Cardinal-Nephew. But Pamphili resigned his position to marry and was replaced by Francesco Maidalchini, nephew of Donna Olimpia Maidalchini. When Maidalchini proved to be a disgraceful failure, Innocent sought the advice of his Cardinal Secretary of State, Cardinal Panciroli who suggested Astalli.

Astalli was elevated to Cardinal on 19 September 1650 by the Pope, who simultaneously adopted him into the Pamphili family (as Camillo Astalli-Pamphili) and appointed him Cardinal-Nephew. Innocent also presented him with a substantial income, the Palazzo Pamphili in Piazza Navona and the villa outside the Porta San Pancrazio.

He served as governor of Fermo and papal legate for the district of Avignon from 1650 to 1653.

== Downfall ==
In his absence, though, Cardinal Panciroli died and Astalli believed his good fortune would fade with the death of his mentor. In particular, Donna Olimpia Maidalchini had been gaining favour with her brother-in-law the Pope. Seeking support from abroad, Astalli took King Philip IV of Spain for his patron.

The unexpected generosity of the pope, however, put him against the Pamphili family and especially Donna Olimpia, so much so that, aided by a series of bad policy choices, as well as a certain inability to handle the Roman Curia, he soon fell out of favor at the papal Court.

In February 1654, with little warning, Pope Innocent stripped Astalli of his titles for allegedly revealing the secrets of state to Spain (plans to invade the Kingdom of Naples). The offence was uncovered by Maidalchini's "spy", Decio Azzolino. The Pope deprived him of the title of Cardinal-Nephew. Astalli was sent from Rome to govern the Diocese of Ferrara. However he did not accept this position and it so infuriated Innocent X that revoked all privileges, even eliminating his adoption into the Pamphili family. He forbade Astalli to use the family name and arms of Pamphili, and in 1655, he exiled him to Sambuci.

On the death of the pope, as a sign of contempt, Astalli showed up at the funeral without being dressed in mourning. Contemporary John Bargrave would later recall that at the funeral of Cardinal Panciroli (at the Quirinal Palace), others told him that it had been the Pope's plan all along for Astalli to take responsibility for a number of failures and scandals and then be removed shortly before the Pope's death to ensure his estate was inherited by his original Cardinal-Nephew, Camillo Pamphili.

== Later career ==
Nonetheless, when Innocent X died, Astalli was still a Cardinal and participated in the papal conclave of 1655 which elected Pope Alexander VII. He was later, rather ironically, appointed cardinal-protector of the Kingdom of Naples.

On 24 January 1661, the cardinals elected him to the post of Camerlengo of the Sacred College of Cardinals for the annual term (until 16 January 1662). On instructions of Philip IV, on 14 July 1661, he was elected during the papacy of Pope Alexander VII as Archbishop (personal title) of Catania. On 25 July 1661, he was consecrated bishop in the church of San Giacomo in Rome by Cardinal Federico Sforza, with Emilio Altieri, Bishop of Camerino, and by Alessandro Crescenzi, Bishop of Bitonto, serving as co-consecrators.

He died on 21 December 1663 in Catania and was buried in the metropolitan cathedral of Catania.

Catholic Church titles
Preceded by Marco Antonio Gussio	Archbishop (personal title) of Catania; 1661–1663	Succeeded by Michelangelo Bonadies
Preceded by Benedetto Odescalchi	Camerlengo of the Sacred College of Cardinals; 1662–1662	Succeeded by Luigi Omodei
Preceded by Gil Carrillo de Albornoz	Cardinal Priest of San Pietro in Montorio; 1653–1662	Succeeded by Celio Piccolomini
