= Camillo Francesco Maria Pamphili =

Italian Catholic cardinal and nobleman (1622-1666)

- Prince of San Martino al Cimino and Valmontone
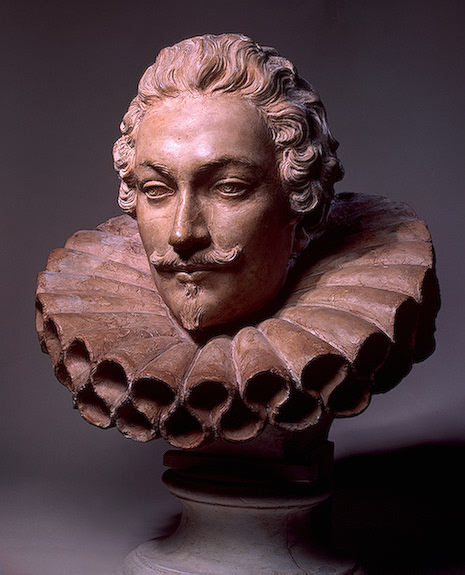
- Bust of Camillo Francesco Maria Pamphili by Alessandro Algardi (c. 1647).
- Other titles: Cardinal; Cardinal-Deacon (by marriage) Prince of Rossano
- Born: 21 February 1622; Naples
- Died: 26 July 1666 (aged 44); Rome
- Spouse: Olimpia Aldobrandini
- Issue: Teresa, Duchess of Massa
- Father: Pamphilio Pamphili
- Mother: Olimpia Maidalchini
Camillo Francesco Maria Pamphili
- Cardinal-Deacon of Santa Maria in Domnica
- Church: Catholic Church
- In office: 12 December 1644 – 21 January 1647
- Predecessor: Alessandro Cesarini, Jr.
- Successor: Lorenzo Raggi
Orders
- Created cardinal: 14 November 1644 by Pope Innocent X

Camillo Francesco Maria Pamphili, 1st Prince of San Martino al Cimino and Valmontone (21 February 1622 – 26 July 1666) was an Italian Catholic cardinal and nobleman of the Pamphili family. His name is often spelled with the final long i orthography; Pamphilj.

== Early life ==
Pamphili was born in Naples on 21 February 1622, son of Pamphilio Pamphili (c. 1564 - 29 August 1639) and wife (1614) Olimpia Maidalchini (c. 1593 - 1657), widow of Paolo Nini, Conservator of the Comune of Viterbo. His sisters were Maria Flaminia Pamphili (1619 - 1682), married on 12 October 1640 to Andrea Giustiniani, Marquess and 1st Prince of Bassano on 21 November 1644 (? - Rome, 1676), and had issue, and Costanza Pamphili, Princess of San Martino and Alviano (1627 - 3 April 1665), married as his third wife to Niccolò Ludovisi, Prince of Piombino, nephew of Pope Gregory XV, and had issue. His father, Pamphilio Pamphili, had moved to Naples with his wife Olimpia Maidalchini, after his brother, Cardinal Giovanni Battista Pamphili, (future Pope Innocent X), became papal nuncio to the Kingdom of Naples. As a young man, Pamphili studied poetry, philosophy, mathematics and architecture.

When his father died, in 1639, efforts began to find Camillo a bride that would honor the family lineage. This remained the intention after his uncle's election to the papacy in 1644. After negotiations had begun for the wedding of his sister Costanza to Niccolò Ludovisi, belonging to the pro-Spanish faction, a potential bride for the young Pamphili was sought in the pro-French faction. Olimpia Maidalchini advocated for the candidacy of Taddeo Barberini's daughter, Lucrezia, then twelve years old. The move was designed to mend the rift between the Pamphili and the Barberini which had developed after Pope Innocent's election (he had the Barberini investigated for misappropriation of funds during the First War of Castro).

== Ecclesiastic career ==
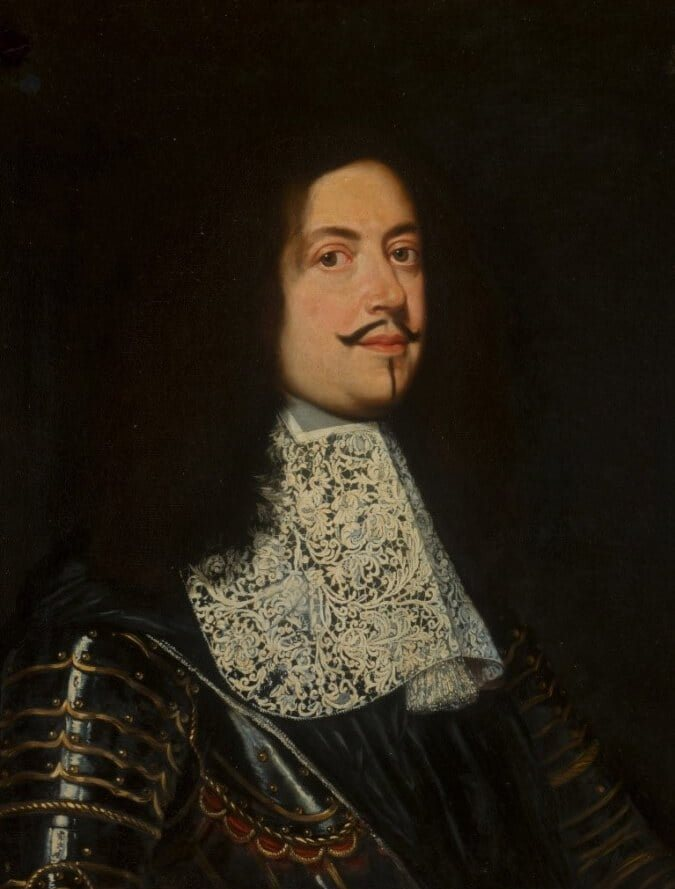
Camillo Francesco Maria Pamphilj

On 15 September 1644, Giovanni Battista Pamphili was elected to the papal throne as Pope Innocent X. Shortly thereafter Camillo was appointed General of the Papal Army. This post was usually assigned to the lay-nephew of the Pope, but shortly afterwards Camillo Pamphili expressed his wish to become Cardinal-nephew. Camillo was created Cardinal Deacon in the consistory of 14 November 1644 with the titulus Santa Maria in Domnica; and Cardinal-nephew a month later. Though he was described as a happy young man, pleasant to friends and staff, contemporary records of his cardinalate suggest he lost interest in his new-found piety fairly quickly, leading a lazy life, sometimes not rising from bed until 7:00 pm.

The role of cardinal-nephew had become by the second half of the sixteenth century a significant position in the administration of the Papal States, but Innocent X distributed much of the responsibilities. Some of the duties were shared with the Secretary of State Giovanni Giacomo Panciroli. Military tasks were delegated to his two brothers-in-law, Niccolò Ludovisi and Andrea Giustiniani, husband of his older sister Maria Flaminia. According to Theodoro Ameyden, by 1646 the pope was again thinking of his nephew, the only male heir of the Roman Pamphili, marrying and at this stage there reappeared on the horizon the possibility of a marriage alliance with the Barberini.

== Resignation, marriage and later life ==
Camillo developed a particular interest in Olimpia Aldobrandini, a young noblewoman who had been in attendance at the Palazzo Pamphili the day after his uncle's coronation. She was the grand-niece and later sole heir of Pope Clement VIII. However, she was married to powerful nobleman Paolo Borghese, and Pamphili, according to his contemporaries, was not one to indulge in an illicit affair. When Borghese died in 1646, Pamphili made his intentions clear. The two families were already close; Aldobrandini's maternal uncle, Niccolò Ludovisi, had married Camillo's sister, Costanza.

Against his mother's wishes he resigned the cardinalate on 21 January 1647 and a few weeks later (10 February 1647) the two were married. The choice of the bride so displeased the Pope and his mother, who both favored a union with the Barberini, that neither of them took part in the wedding. His cousin, Francesco Maidalchini, was appointed Cardinal-nephew.

Aldobrandini's dowry included a collection of paintings (including masterpieces removed from the Duke of Ferrara's "Camerino d’Alabastro"), villas in Montemagnanapoli and Frascati, the great Albodrandini estates in Romagna on the Corso in Rome, and the Palazzo Aldobrandini. These estates and property thus passed to the Pamphili family and became the nucleus for the Galleria Doria Pamphilj. So furious was Olimpia that she banished them from Rome and the Palazzo Pamphili. They did not return until her death ten years later in 1657.

Relying on his wife’s rich dowry, in 1650 Prince Pamphlili developed a vast new villa on Janiculum hill. It contained the largest park in Rome. Camillo also commissioned Gian Lorenzo Bernini to build the baroque Church of Sant'Andrea al Quirinale (in 1658). The church was not completed until 1670, after Pamphili's death. He died at his Palazzo Pamphili on the via Lata, Rome, on 26 July 1666.

When the Roman branch of the Pamphlili family ended in 1760, Anna and Giovanni inherited the palazzo in Rome. Benedetto Pamphili became Grand prior in Rome of the Order of St. John of Jerusalem, and in 1681 was named a cardinal.

== Family ==
Camillo Pamphili and Olimpia Aldobrandini had five children:

- Flaminia Pamphili (died 1709) married (1) Bernardino Savelli, Duke of Castelgandolfo, and had no children; married (2) Niccolò Francesco Pallavicini, Prince of Civitella, and had no children.
- Teresa Pamphili (1650–1704) married Carlo II Cybo-Malaspina, Duke of Massa, and had children.
- Anna Pamphili (1652–1728) married Giannandrea Doria, Prince of Melfi in 1671, and founded the Doria-Pamphili-Landi line.
- Benedetto Pamphilj, Cardinal (1653-1730)
- Giambattista Pamphili, Prince of Carpinetti & of Belvedere (died 1717) married Violante Facchinetti and had a daughter Olimpia (1672–1731) who married Filippo Colonna, Prince of Paliano, son of Marie Mancini.

== Portraits ==
- Marble bust by Alessandro Algardi (Hermitage Museum)
- Painting by Giusto Sustermans (Palazzo Pitti)
- Painting by Giovan Battista Gaulli (Palazzo Reale, Naples}
