= Leonardo Marsili =

18th-century Roman Catholic bishop

Most Reverend Leonardo Marsili
- Archbishop of Siena
- Church: Catholic Church
- Archdiocese: Archdiocese of Siena
- In office: 1682–1713
- Predecessor: Celio Piccolomini
- Successor: Alessandro Zondadari

Orders
- Ordination: 17 May 1665
- Consecration: February 1682 by Gasparo Carpegna

Personal details
- Born: 15 May 1641 Siena, Italy Siena, Italy
- Died: 8 Apr 1713 (age 78) Siena, Italy

Leonardo Marsili (1641–1713) was a Roman Catholic prelate who served as Archbishop of Siena (1682–1713).

He was born in Siena, Italy on 15 May 1641 and ordained a priest on 17 May 1665. On 26 Jan 1682, he was appointed during the papacy of Pope Innocent XI as Archbishop of Siena. In February 1682, he was consecrated bishop in Rome by Gasparo Carpegna, Cardinal-Priest of San Silvestro in Capite. He served as Archbishop of Siena until his death on 8 Apr 1713 in Siena.

While bishop, he was the principal co-consecrator of Ulisse Giuseppe Gozzadini, Titular Archbishop of Teodosia (1700).

== External links and additional sources ==
- Cheney, David M. "Archdiocese of Siena-Colle di Val d'Elsa-Montalcino". Catholic-Hierarchy.org. (for Chronology of Bishops) ^{[self-published]}
- Chow, Gabriel. "Metropolitan Archdiocese of Siena–Colle di Val d'Elsa–Montalcino (Italy)". GCatholic.org. (for Chronology of Bishops) ^{[self-published]}

Catholic Church titles
Preceded by Celio Piccolomini	Archbishop of Siena; 1682–1713	Succeeded by Alessandro Zondadari
