= Romanum decet Pontificem =

1692 papal bull banning cardinal-nephews

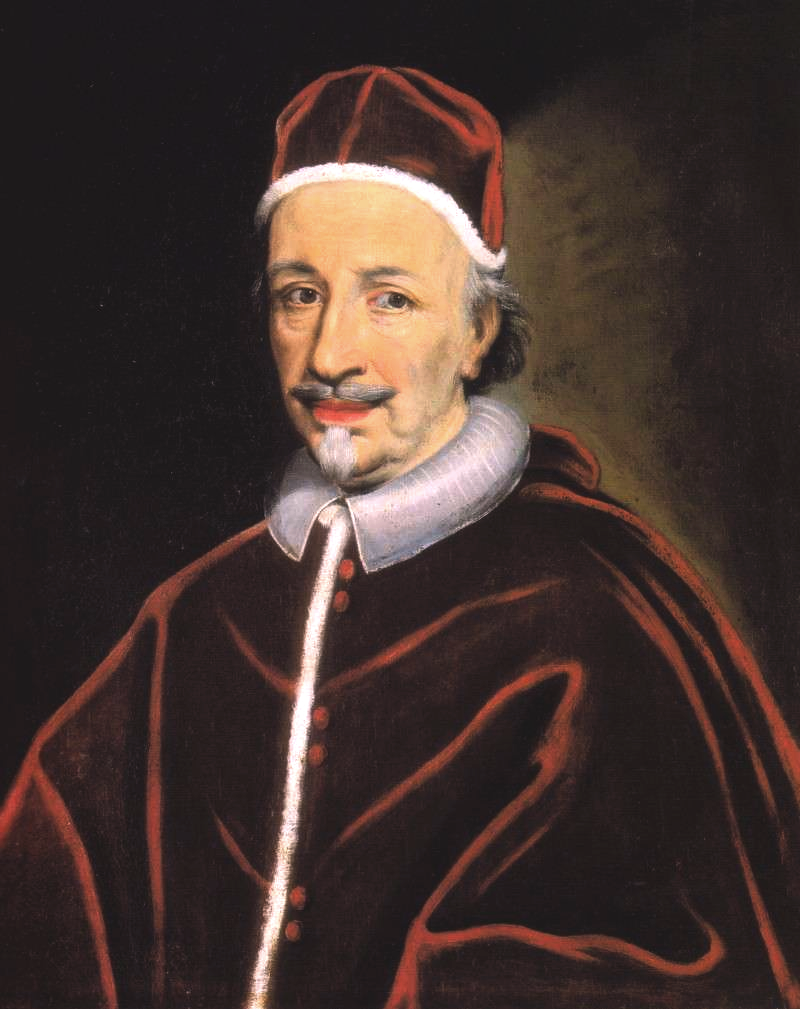
Pope Innocent XII issued Romanum decet pontificem on June 22, 1692

Romanum decet Pontificem (named for its Latin incipit: "it befits the Roman pontiff") is a papal bull issued by Pope Innocent XII (1691–1700) on June 22, 1692, banning the office of cardinal-nephew, limiting his successors to elevating only one cardinal relative, eliminating various sinecures traditionally reserved for cardinal-nephews and capping the stipend or endowment the nephew of a pope could receive to 12,000 scudi.

Romanum decet Pontificem was later incorporated into the Code of Canon Law of 1917 in canons 240, 2; 1414, 4; and 1432, 1. In 1694, Innocent XII's series of reforms was capped off with an expensive campaign to eliminate the venality of offices while reimbursing their current holders.

However, following Romanum decet Pontificem, only three of the eight popes of the 18th century did not make a nephew or brother cardinal, and two of the three were members of monastic orders, that is without a family in the proper sense.
