= Giovanni Giacomo Panciroli =

Italian cardinal

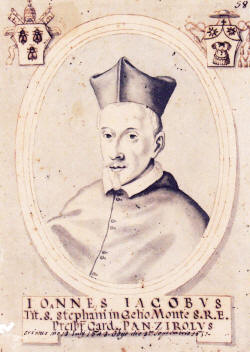
Portrait of Giovanni Giacomo Panciroli

Giovanni Giacomo Panciroli (1587 – 3 September 1651) was an Italian Catholic Cardinal and Cardinal Secretary of State.

== Life ==
Panciroli was born in 1587 in Rome and was educated there, receiving a doctorate utroque iure in 1605. He became an advocate to the Roman Curia and then accompanied Giovanni Battista Pamphili (later Pope Innocent X) during his service as nuncio to Naples and Spain. When he returned to Rome, he entered the service of the Barberini (Francesco and Antonio, nephews of Pope Urban VIII). He became chamberlain to the Pope and superintendent of the house of Cardinal Francesco Barberini. In 1632, he became auditor of the Sacred Roman Rota.

In 1641, he was appointed Latin Patriarch of Constantinople; a position he held until 1643. Paniciroli was consecrated bishop on January 12, 1642 in the church of Santa Maria in Vallicella, in Rome and named nuncio extraordinary to Spain on January 18, 1642.

Panciroli was elevated to cardinal on 13 July 1643 by Pope Urban VIII and was installed as Cardinal Priest at the Basilica of Santo Stefano Rotondo. The following year, Pope Urban died and Panciroli participated in the Papal conclave of 1644 which elected Pope Innocent X.

== Secretary of State ==
Upon Pope Innocent's election in September 1644, Panciroli was appointed Cardinal Secretary of State, which duties he shared with the Pope's Cardinal-Nephew Camillo Francesco Maria Pamphili until in January 1647 Pamphili resigned his cardinalate to marry Olimpia Aldobrandini. The resignation increased Panciroli's role, which enjoyed an authority in the Curia unusual for a minister not a blood relative of the Pope, even for a secretary of state, a position still far from taking on the importance that would later have. At the same time, he had to contend with the significant influence Donna Olimpia held with her brother-in-law, the pope. This situation periodically impeded the efficient operation of the curia.

When Innocent X asked the Secretary of State for a recommendation regarding a replacement for his woefully incompetent Cardinal-nephew, Francesco Maidalchini. Pancirolo suggested his secretary, Camillo Astalli, a distant relative by marriage to Olympia. Although continuing to enjoy the unconditional esteem of the pope, this raised the ire of the Pamphili family and their associates. Constant attacks combined with declining health contributed to a progressive loss of authority in the Curia.

Panciroli died on 3 September 1651 at the Quirinal Palace in Rome. Upon Panciroli's death, the position was filled by Fabio Chigi who was later elected to the papal throne as Pope Alexander VII.
