= Celio Piccolomini =

Roman Catholic cardinal

His Eminence Celio Piccolomini
- Cardinal-Priest of San Pietro in Montorio; Archbishop of Siena
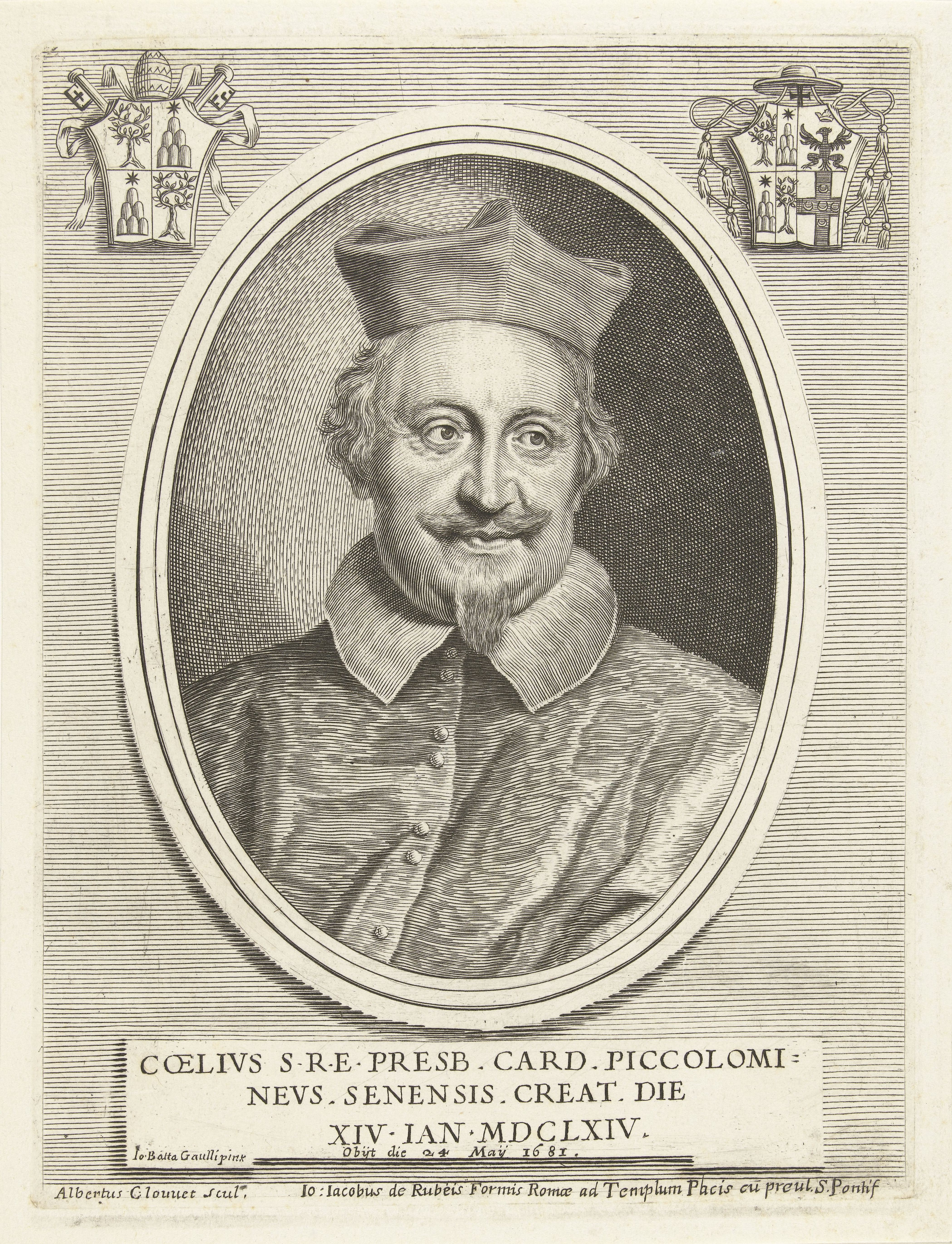
- Church: Catholic Church

Orders
- Consecration: 29 Oct 1656 by Giulio Cesare Sacchetti

Personal details
- Born: 1609 Siena, Italy
- Died: 24 May 1681 (age 72)

Celio Piccolomini (1609–1681) was a Roman Catholic cardinal.

== Biography ==
Celio Piccolomini was born in Siena in 1609. On 29 October 1656, he was consecrated bishop by Giulio Cesare Sacchetti, Cardinal-Bishop of Sabina, with Carlo de' Vecchi, Bishop of Chiusi, and Francesco Rinuccini, Bishop of Pistoia e Prato, serving as co-consecrators.

He was named Apostolic Nuncio to France on 15 November 1656 and served until 30 August 1663.

He was made a cardinal on 14 January 1664. He participated in the conclaves that elected Pope Clement IX in 1667, Pope Clement X in 1670, and Pope Innocent XI in 1676.

He was named Archbishop of Siena on 18 March 1681.

He was the principal consecrator of François de Laval de Montmorency, Titular Bishop of Petra in Palaestina (1658); Bonaventura Cavalli, Bishop of Caserta (1668); and Vincenzo Maffia, Bishop of Patti (1671).

Catholic Church titles
Preceded by	Titular Archbishop of Caesarea in Mauretania; 1656–1664	Succeeded by
Preceded by Nicolò Guidi di Bagno	Apostolic Nuncio to France; 1656–1663	Succeeded by Carlo Roberti de' Vittori
Preceded by Camillo Astalli-Pamphilj	Cardinal-Priest of San Pietro in Montorio; 1664–1681	Succeeded by Marco Galli (cardinal)
Preceded by Ascanio II Piccolomini	Archbishop of Siena; 1671–1681	Succeeded by Leonardo Marsili
