= Gregorio Leti =

Italian historian and satirist (1630-1701)

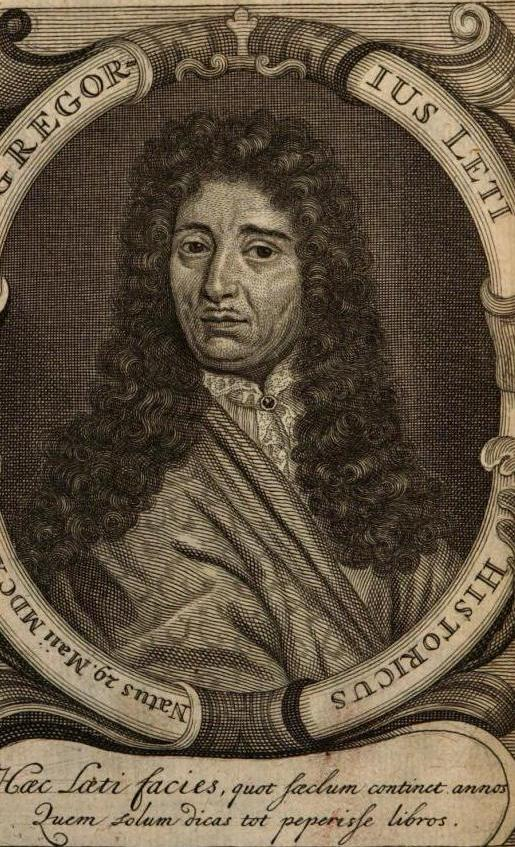
Portrait of Gregorius Leti published in his "Vita di Don Pietro Giron duca d Ossuna", Volume 2, 1699

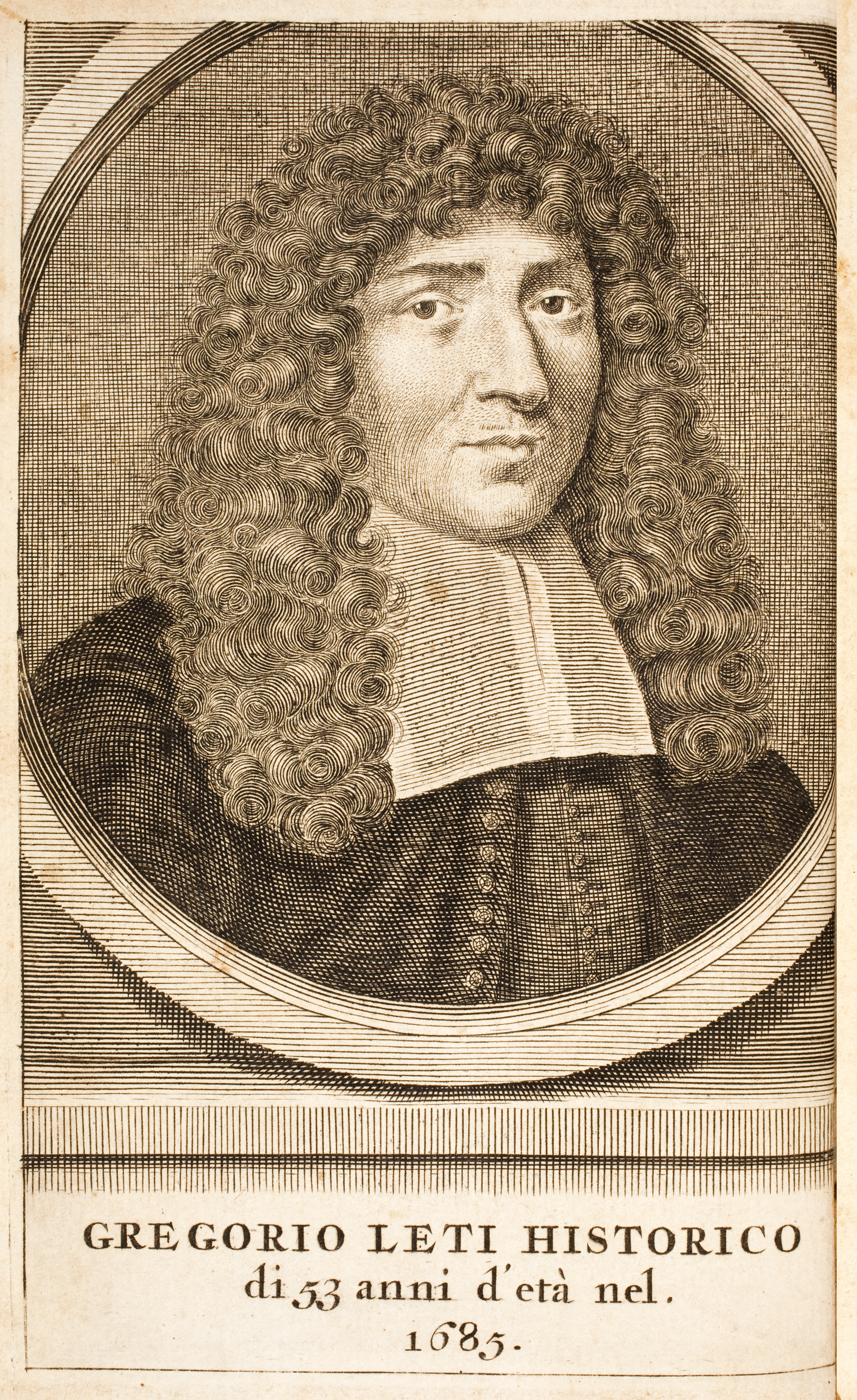
Engraving of Gregorio Leti

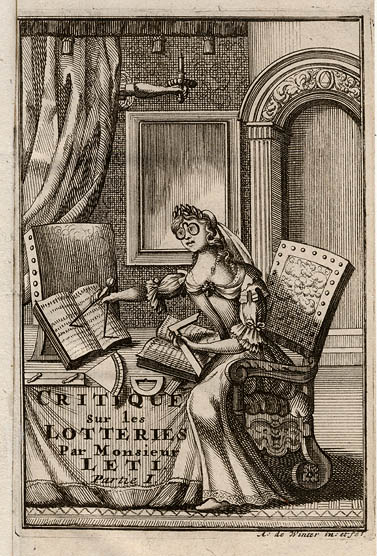
Print from Leti's Critique historique, politique, morale, économique, & comique sur les lotteries

Gregorio Leti (29 May 1630 – 9 June 1701) was an Italian historian and satirist from Milan, who sometimes published under the pseudonym Abbe Gualdi, L'abbé Gualdi, or Gualdus known for his works about the Catholic Church, especially the papacy. All of his publications were listed on the Index Librorum Prohibitorum.

== Life ==
He was born in Milan on 29 May 1630 to Girolamo Leti and Isabella Lampugnano.

Leti's paternal grandfather, Marco, was in the service of Cardinal Ippolito Aldobrandini for two years and was then a judge in Ancona. He married Laura Pizzi and had two children, Agostino Francesco Nicola and Girolamo. Girolamo followed a military career under the Medici. In 1628, he was sent by Ferdinando II de Medici as an infantry Captain to Milan to help the Spaniards. Here Girolamo met and married Isabella, a Milanese noblewoman. From this marriage was born Caterina (who married Cesare Reina, secretary of the Senate of Milan) and a son, Leti.

In 1632, Leti followed his parents to Amantea, where Girolamo became garrison commander. In 1639, following the death of his father, Leti was sent by his mother to the Jesuit college at Cosenza, where he remained forcibly until 1644, when he accepted the invitation of his uncle Agostino to join him in Rome. In Rome, his uncle tried in vain to encourage Leti to start a career in law or to become a priest. Under this pressure, Leti decided to return to his mother in Milan, where he stayed until her death in 1646.

Orphaned at age 16, he was forced to return to his uncle, now a vicar in Orvieto and to adapt to the severe discipline of his tutor Don Agostino Cauli. He remained in the charge of his uncle until 1654, moving to Naples in 1647, to Milan in 1650 and returning to Rome in 1652, where he made contacts with the Academy of Humorists.

In 1654, his uncle Agostino, having failed to form his nephew in a suitable profession, finally gave Leti charge of his inheritance, leaving him free to travel. In 1655, facing financial trouble, Leti returned to his uncle, who had since become Bishop of Acquapendente in Umbria. Here he proposed marriage to Antonia Ferretti, but was refused and soon after left home permanently.

Although Leti was educated in a Jesuit school, he later became a Protestant. He resided in the court of Louis XIV of France and in 1680 that of Charles II of England, who commissioned him to write a history of England. Leti had access to the library of the Earl of Anglesey, which numbered over 5,000 volumes, as well as that of Bishop Gilbert Burnet. He wrote the first ever proper life of Elizabeth I of England, which includes many romantic embellishments about her youth and her mother, Anne Boleyn. Nevertheless, he may have used documents he found in the English libraries. Leti was also elected a member of the Royal Society.

After the publication of a collection of anecdotes which offended Charles II, Il Teatro Britannico, Leti fled England in 1683 for Amsterdam, where he became the city historiographer in 1685. He died in Amsterdam in 1701.

Leti's biography of Pope Sixtus V has been translated into many languages, and contains an anecdote similar to the infamous "pound of flesh" from William Shakespeare's The Merchant of Venice. The Catholic Encyclopedia calls Leti "mendacious and inexact" and is also critical of works described as derivative of Leti's "anti-papal histories." Mosheim, a Lutheran church historian, called Leti "inaccurate and unfaithful." According to Thomas Trollope, "his inexactitude as an historian is notorious." Even secular writers have characterised his biography of Sixtus V as "resting on very slight authority." Among his critics, Leti is sometimes referred to as the "Varillas of Italy."

Leti was the father-in-law of the scholar and theologian Jean Leclerc.

== Works ==
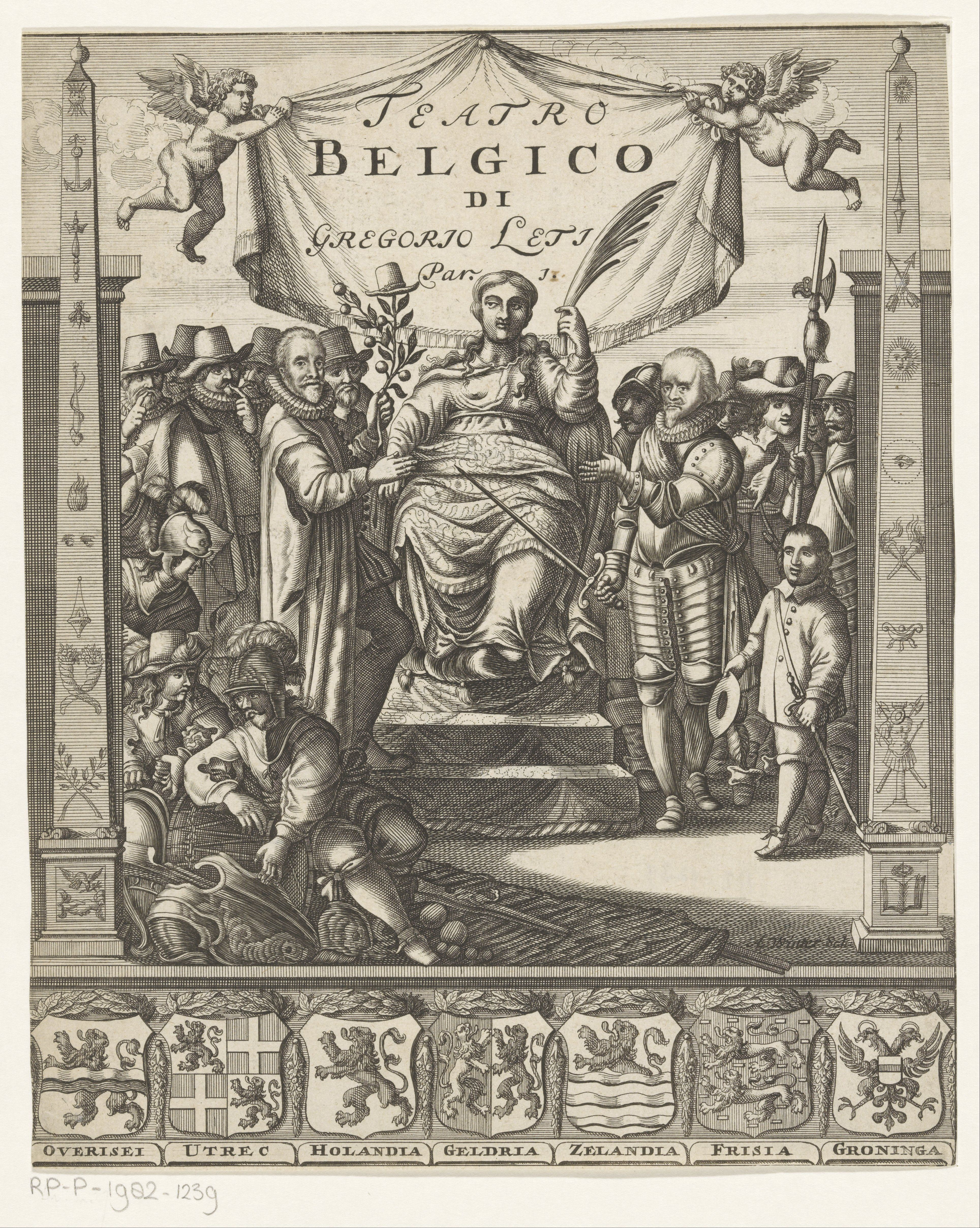
Gregorio Leti, Teatro Belgico, Amsterdam, Willem de Jonge, 1690.

- 1666. Histoire de Donna Olimpia Maldachini.
- 1666. Dialoghi Politici, O Vero La Politica che usano in questi tempi, i Prencipi, E Republiche Italiane, Per conservare i loro Stati, E Signorie: Il tutto raccolto, d'alcune conferenze hauute tra un'Ambasciatore d'una Republica, & un Ministro di Stato d'un Prencipe.
- 1667. Il Nipotismo di Roma, o vero relatione delle ragioni che muovono i Pontefici all'aggrandimento de' Nipoti ("Papal Nepotism, or the True Relation of the Reasons Which Impel the Popes to make their Nephews Powerful").
- 1668. Il Cardinalissimo di Santa Chiesa.
- 1668 Il Pvttanisno Romano, à Vero, Conclave Generale delle Puttane della Corte From the Collections at the Library of Congress.
- 1671. Le visioni politiche sopra gli interessi più reconditi di tutti i principi e repubbliche della Cristianità.
- 1672 L'Europa Gelosa
- 1682. La Vita della Regina Elizabetta.
- 1684. Il Teatro Britannico.
- 1685. L'histoire de la vie du Pape Sixte Cinquième.
- 1685. Il ceremoniale historico e politico, opera utilissima a tutti gli Ambasciatori.
- 1686. Historia Genevrena.
- 1690. Teatro Belgico, o vero Ritratti Historici, Chronologici, Politici, e Geografici (online).
- 1693. Historia overo Vita di Elisabetta, Regina d'Inghilterra.
- 1697. Critique historique, politique, morale, économique, & comique sur les lotteries.
