= San Martino al Cimino =

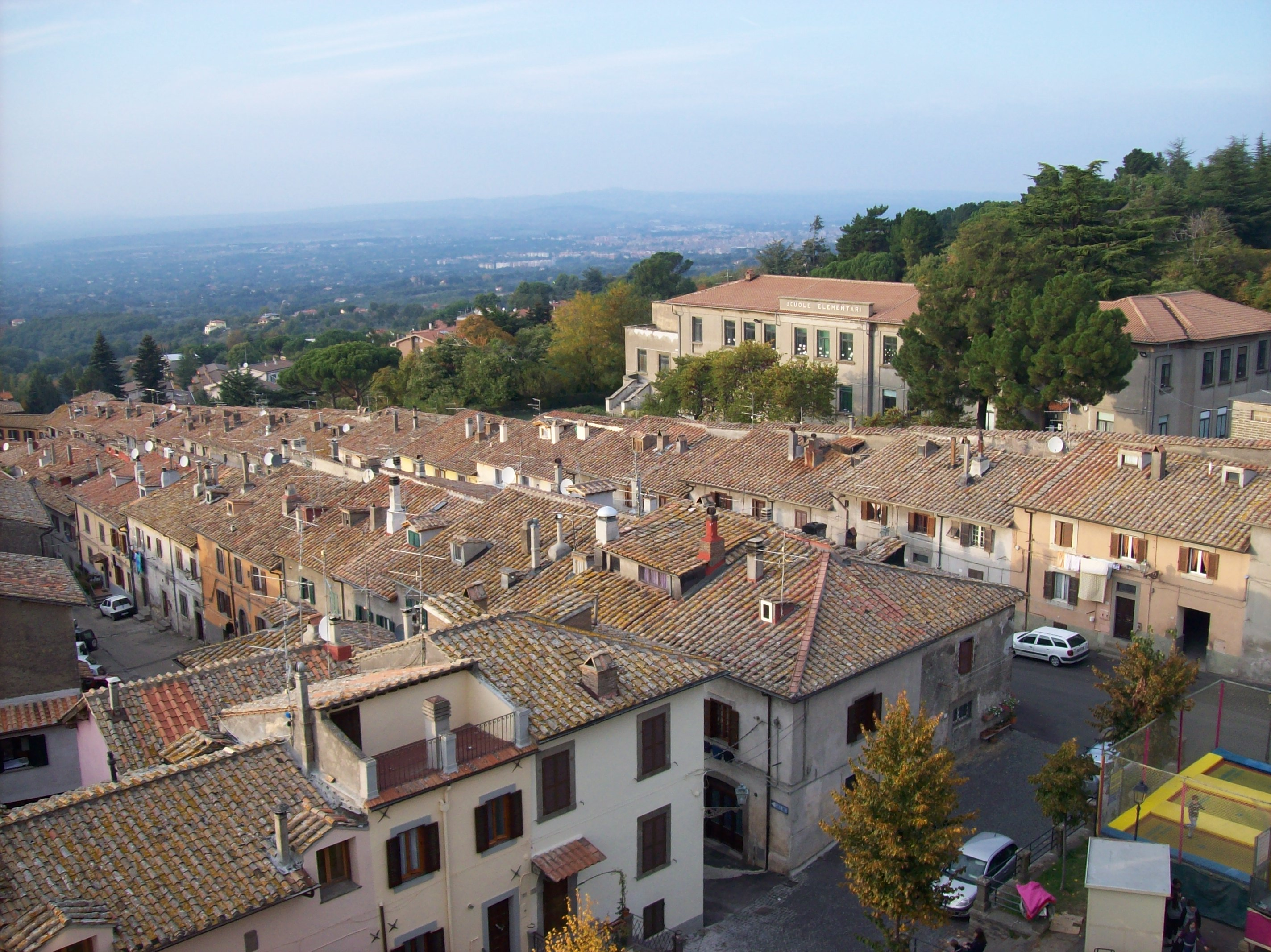

San Martino al Cimino is a hamlet located a few kilometers south of Viterbo, at the top of Mount Cimino, in the Province of Viterbo within Lazio, Italy.

Until 1928, it functioned as a separate town, but today, administratively, it is now a neighborhood or frazione of Viterbo. The oval central portion of the hamlet, sheltered behind town walls and punctured by two gates, arose around a former 13th-century Cistercian monastery, acquired circa 1647 by Olimpia Maidalchini Pamphilj (1591-1657), sister in law of Pope Innocent X Pamphili, who became highly influential during this pope's reign. Her palace is now referred to as the Palazzo Doria Pamphilj (not to be confused with the similarly named palace in Rome). In 1899 the palace with a new facade by Enrico Calandrelli, was converted into an orphanage for abandoned infants: Ospizio Umberto I per gli Esposti.

The hamlet is notable for the gothic architecture church, once part of the Territorial abbacy of San Martino al Monte Cimino, and the Pamphili palace, erected utilizing parts of the monastery. In addition, the housing inside the walls reflects urban planning in the Baroque era. Above the two portals are heraldic shields of the Pamphili family with three fleur-de-lis above a dove holding an olive branch
