= Cardinal-nephew =

Cardinal appointed by a papal relative

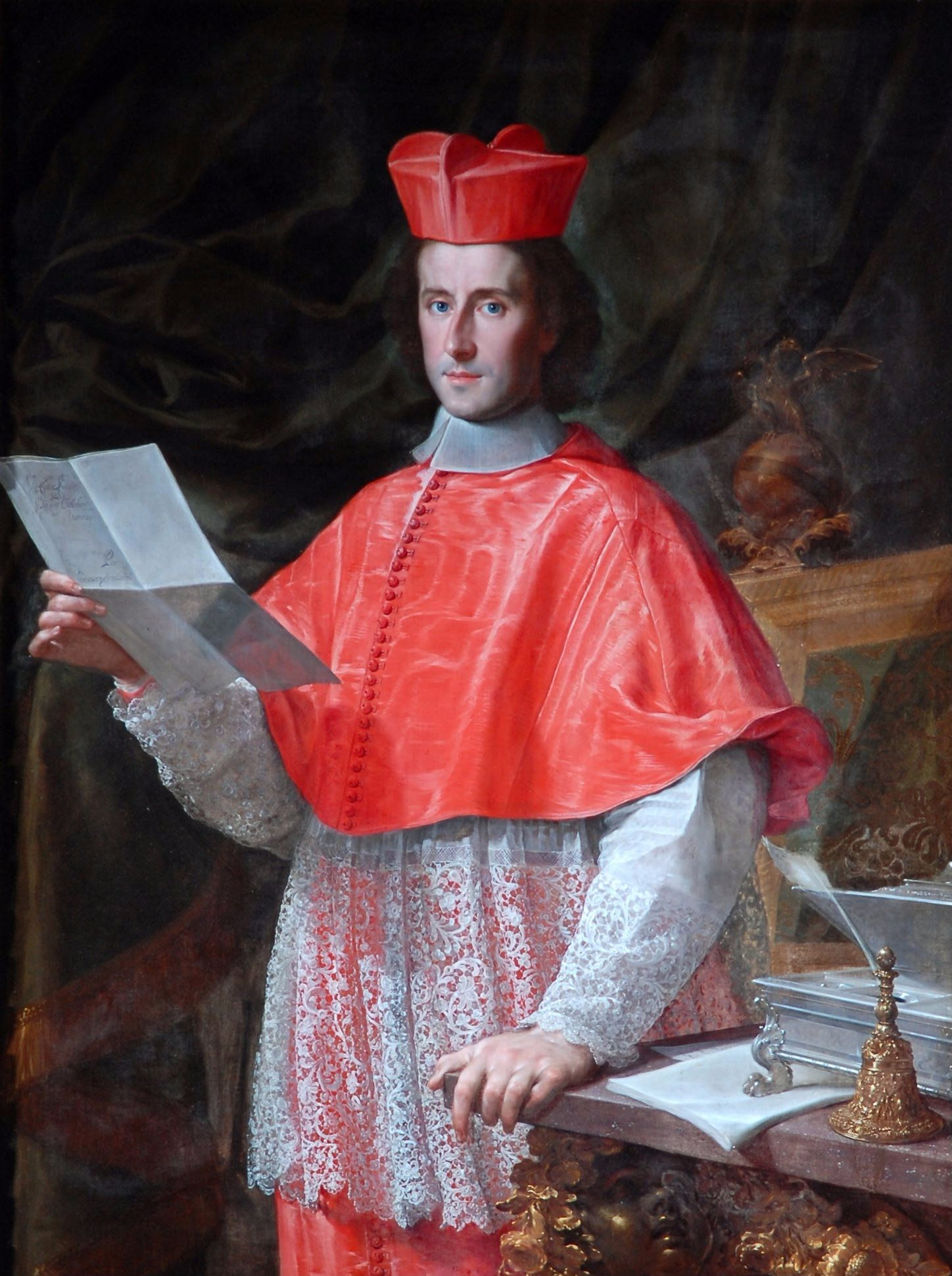
Pietro Ottoboni (1667–1740), the last holder of the post of cardinal-nephew, painted by Francesco Trevisani

A cardinal-nephew (Latin: cardinalis nepos; Italian: cardinale nipote; Spanish: valido de su tío; Portuguese: cardeal-sobrinho; French: prince de fortune) was a cardinal elevated by a pope who was that cardinal's relative. The practice of creating cardinal-nephews originated in the Middle Ages and reached its apex during the 16th and 17th centuries. The last cardinal-nephew was named in 1689, and the practice was abolished in 1692. The word nepotism originally referred specifically to this practice when it appeared in the English language about 1669. From the middle of the Avignon Papacy (1309–1377) until Pope Innocent XII's anti-nepotism bull (a papal charter) Romanum decet pontificem (1692), a pope without a cardinal-nephew was the exception to the rule. Every Renaissance pope who created cardinals appointed a relative to the College of Cardinals, and the nephew was the most common choice.

The institution of the cardinal-nephew evolved over seven centuries, tracking developments in the history of the papacy and the styles of individual popes. From 1566 until 1692, a cardinal-nephew held the curial office of the Superintendent of the Ecclesiastical State, known as the Cardinal Nephew, and thus the terms are sometimes used interchangeably. The curial office of the Cardinal Nephew as well as the institution of the cardinal-nephew declined as the power of the Cardinal Secretary of State increased and the temporal power of popes decreased in the 17th and 18th centuries.

The list of cardinal-nephews includes at least fifteen, and possibly as many as nineteen, who became pope themselves (Gregory IX, Alexander IV, Adrian V, Gregory XI, Boniface IX, Innocent VII, Eugene IV, Paul II, Alexander VI, Pius III, Julius II, Leo X, Clement VII, Benedict XIII, and Pius VII; perhaps also John XIX and Benedict IX, if they were really promoted cardinals; as well as Innocent III and Benedict XII, if in fact they were related to their elevators); one antipope (John XXIII); and two or three saints (Charles Borromeo, Guarinus of Palestrina, and perhaps Anselm of Lucca, if he was really a cardinal).

== History ==
=== Before 1566 ===
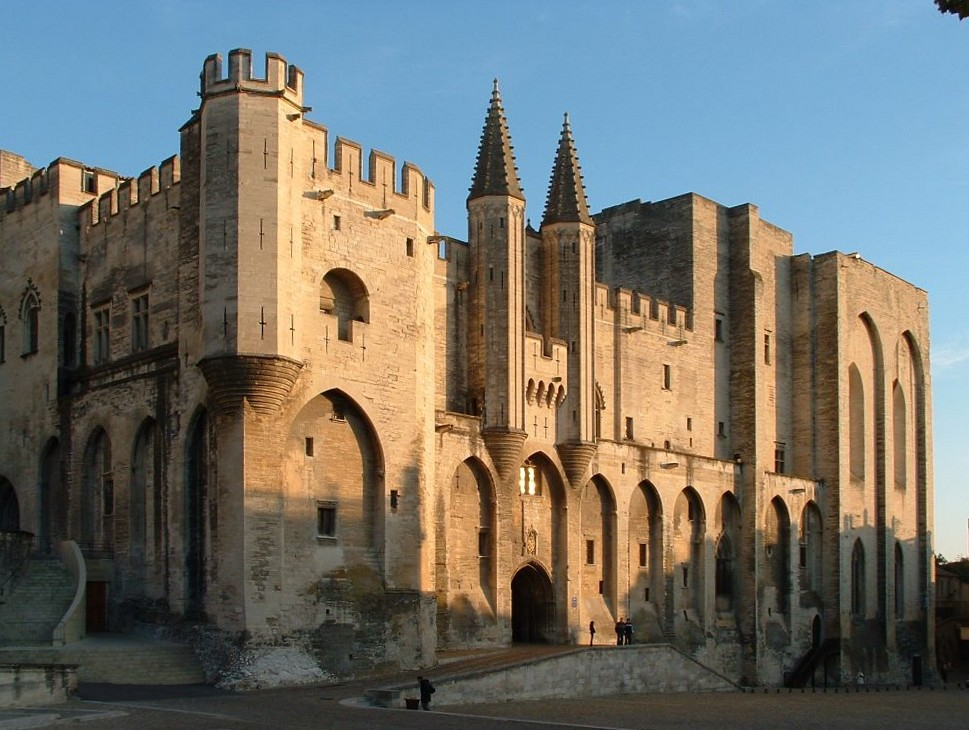
The Avignon Papacy (1309–1377) produced an unprecedented number of cardinal-nephews.

The creation of cardinal-nephews predates the hierarchical preeminence of cardinals within the Roman Catholic Church, which grew out of the 1059 decree of Pope Nicholas II, In nomine Domini, which established cardinal bishops as the sole electors of the pope, with the consent of cardinal deacons and cardinal priests. The first known cardinal-nephew is Lottario (Latin: Loctarius), seniore, cousin of Pope Benedict VIII (1012–1024), elected circa 1015. Benedict VIII also elevated his brother Giovanni (the future Pope John XIX) and his cousin Teofilatto (the future Pope Benedict IX) as cardinal-deacons. The first known cardinal-nephew after 1059 is Anselm of Lucca, the nephew or brother of Pope Alexander II (1061–1073), although until the end of the 12th century the majority of the alleged cases of such appointments are dubious, either because the relationship between the pope and cardinal is not proven, or because the cardinalate of the papal kinsman is uncertain. However, it is beyond doubt that the promotions of papal relatives to the College of Cardinals were common in the 13th century.

According to historian John Bargrave, "by the Council of Bazill, Session 21, the number of cardinals was not to be above 24, and not any nephew of the Pope or of any cardinal was to be of that number. (Session 23.)"

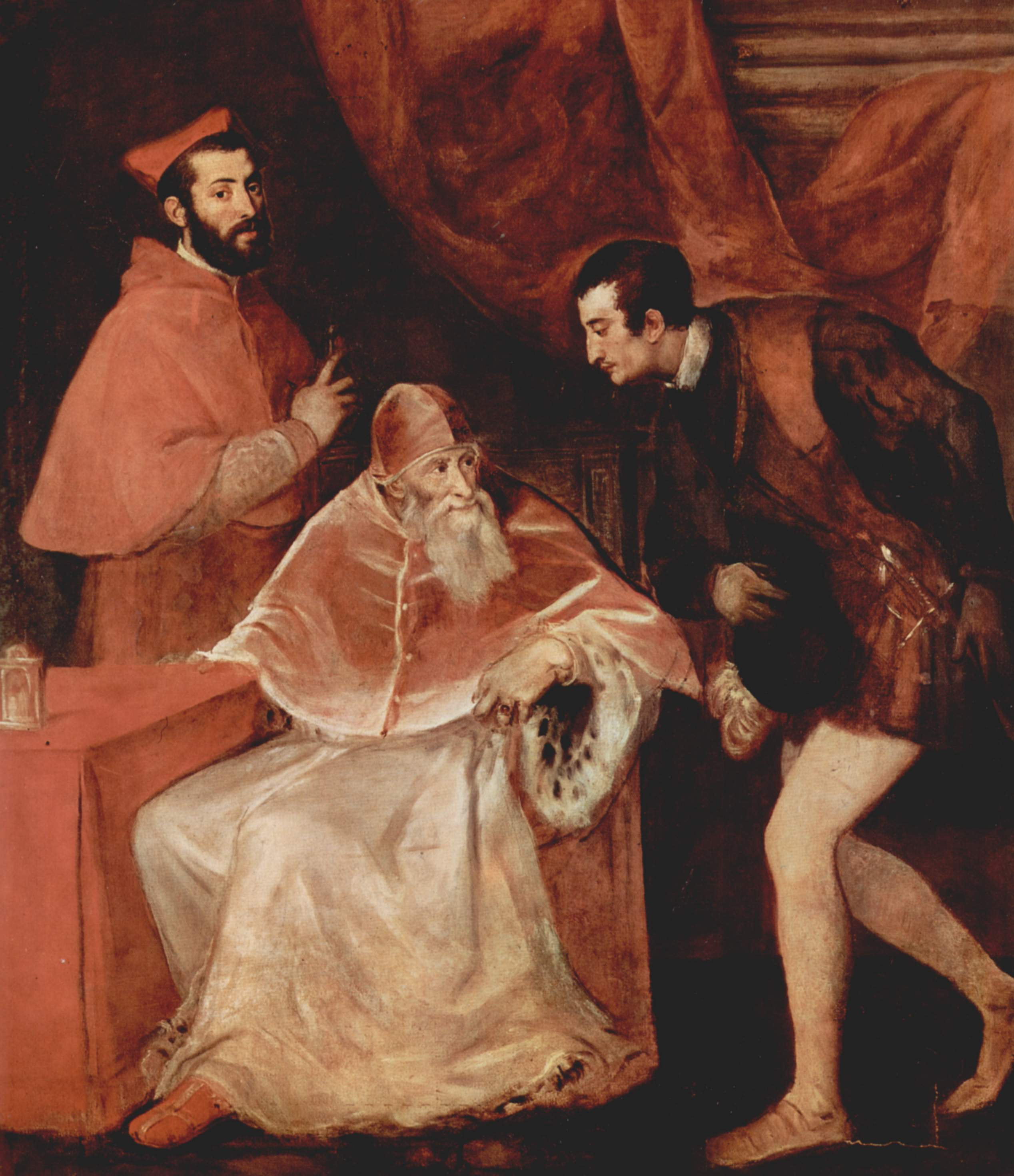
Pope Paul III with his cardinal-nephew Alessandro Farnese (left) and his other grandson, Ottavio Farnese, Duke of Parma (right)

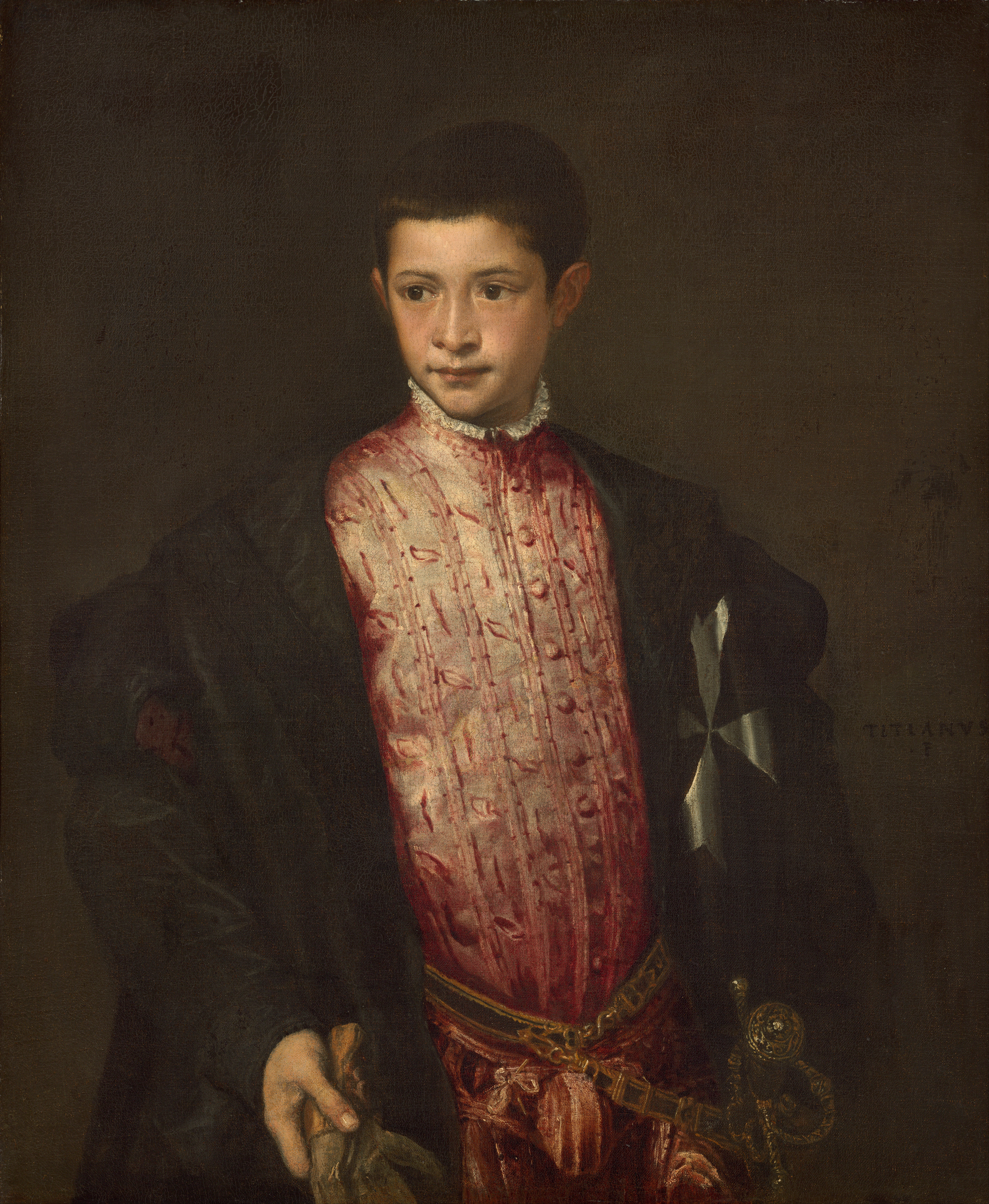
Ranuccio Farnese was made cardinal by Paul III at the age of 15.

Pope Clement VI (1342–1352) created more cardinal-nephews than any other pontiff, including six on September 20, 1342, the greatest number of cardinal-nephews elevated at one time. The capitulation of the 1464 papal conclave limited the pope it elected (Pope Paul II) to appointing one cardinal-nephew, along with other conditions designed to increase the power of the College of Cardinals and reduce the pope's ability to dilute that power.

The Fifth Council of the Lateran declared in 1514 that the care of relatives was to be commended, and the creation of cardinal-nephews was often recommended or justified based on the need to care for indigent family members. A cardinal-nephew could usually expect profitable appointments; for example, Alessandro Farnese, cardinal-nephew of Pope Paul III (1534–1549), held 64 benefices simultaneously in addition to the vice-chancellorship.

Pope Paul IV (1555–1559), in his old age, was said to have "fallen almost completely under the cardinal-nephew's influence"; Paul IV's cardinal-nephew, Carlo Carafa, was accused in August 1558 by a Theatine of seducing a Roman noblewoman, Plautila de' Massimi, who had come into possession of an inordinate amount of money and jewelry, but the accusations were dismissed by the pontiff. Saint Charles Borromeo, cardinal-nephew of Pope Pius IV (1559–1565), had ensured the subordination of the secretarius intimus to the Cardinal Nephew, which came to be sometimes known as the secretarius maior. Pius IV was notorious for nepotism: between 1561 and 1565 he transferred more than 350,000 scudi to his relatives.

=== 1566–1692 ===
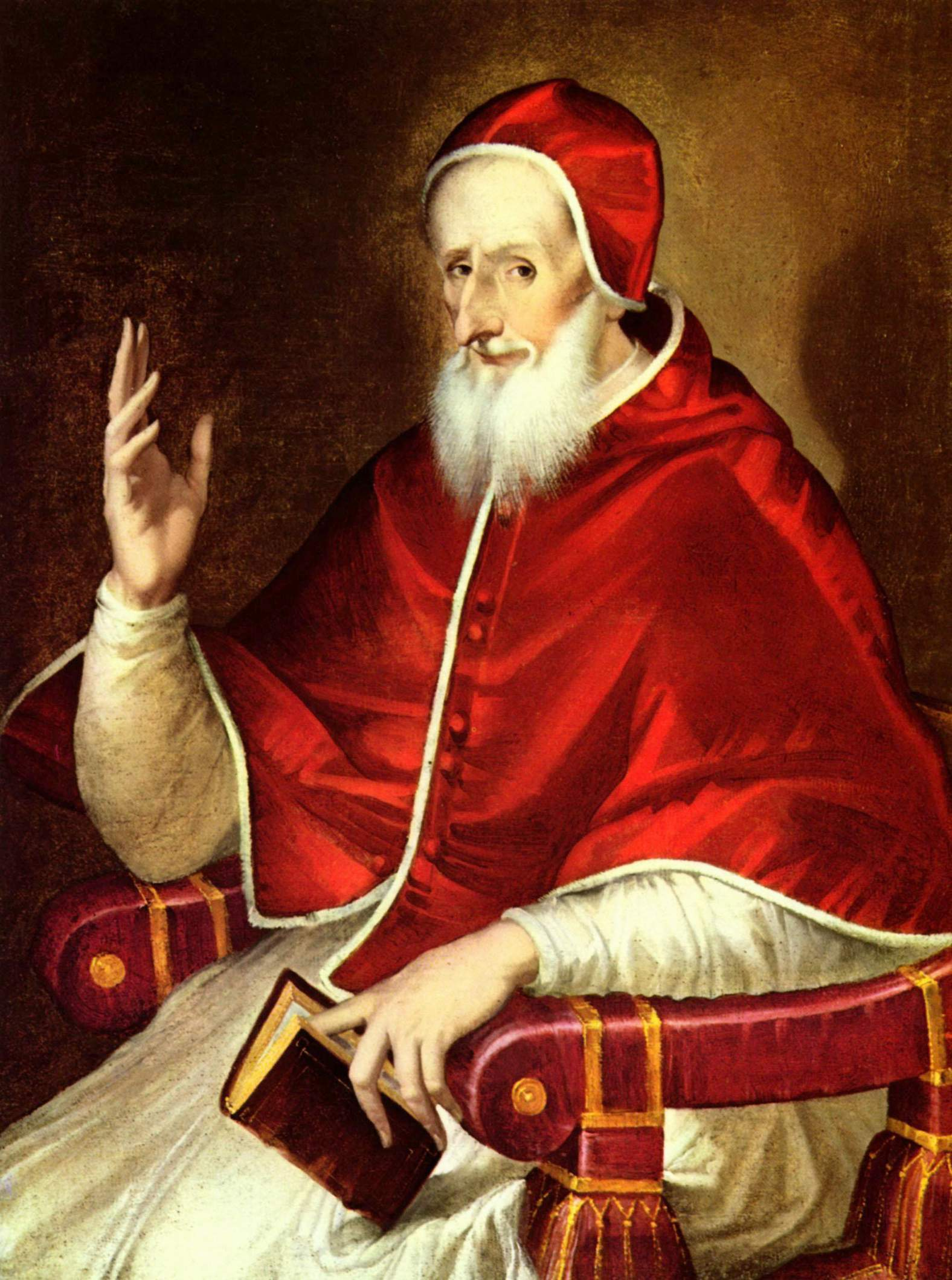
Pope Pius V created the curial office of the Cardinal Nephew on March 14, 1566.

Following the Council of Trent (1563), Pope Pius V (1566–1572) drew up the terms for the office of the Superintendent of the Ecclesiastical State, who was to handle the temporal affairs of the Papal States and the foreign relations of the Holy See. After abortively attempting to divide the duties of the Superintendent among four non-familial cardinals, Pius V acceded to the urgings of the College of Cardinals and his Spanish ambassador, and appointed his grandnephew, Michele Bonelli, as Superintendent, demarcating his duties with a papal bull of March 14, 1566. However, Pius V relentlessly avoided delegating any real autonomous power to Bonelli.

The Cardinal Nephew (also called cardinale padrone or Secretarius Papae et superintendens status ecclesiasticæ: "Superintendent of the Ecclesiastical State", Italian: Sopraintendente dello Stato Ecclesiastico) was an official legate of the Roman Curia, approximately equivalent to the Cardinal Secretary of State, which absorbed its functions after the office of Cardinal Nephew was abolished in 1692. The office has been likened by historians to a "prime minister", "alter ego", or "vice-pope". The Cardinal Nephew was generally among a pope's first cardinal creations, and his creature was traditionally accompanied by a salute from the guns of Castel Sant'Angelo.

Following the Avignon Papacy, the Cardinal Nephew was responsible for the spiritual and temporal governance of the Comtat Venaissin, where the Avignon Popes had resided; in 1475, Pope Sixtus IV raised the Diocese of Avignon to the rank of an archbishopric, to the benefit of his nephew Giuliano della Rovere.

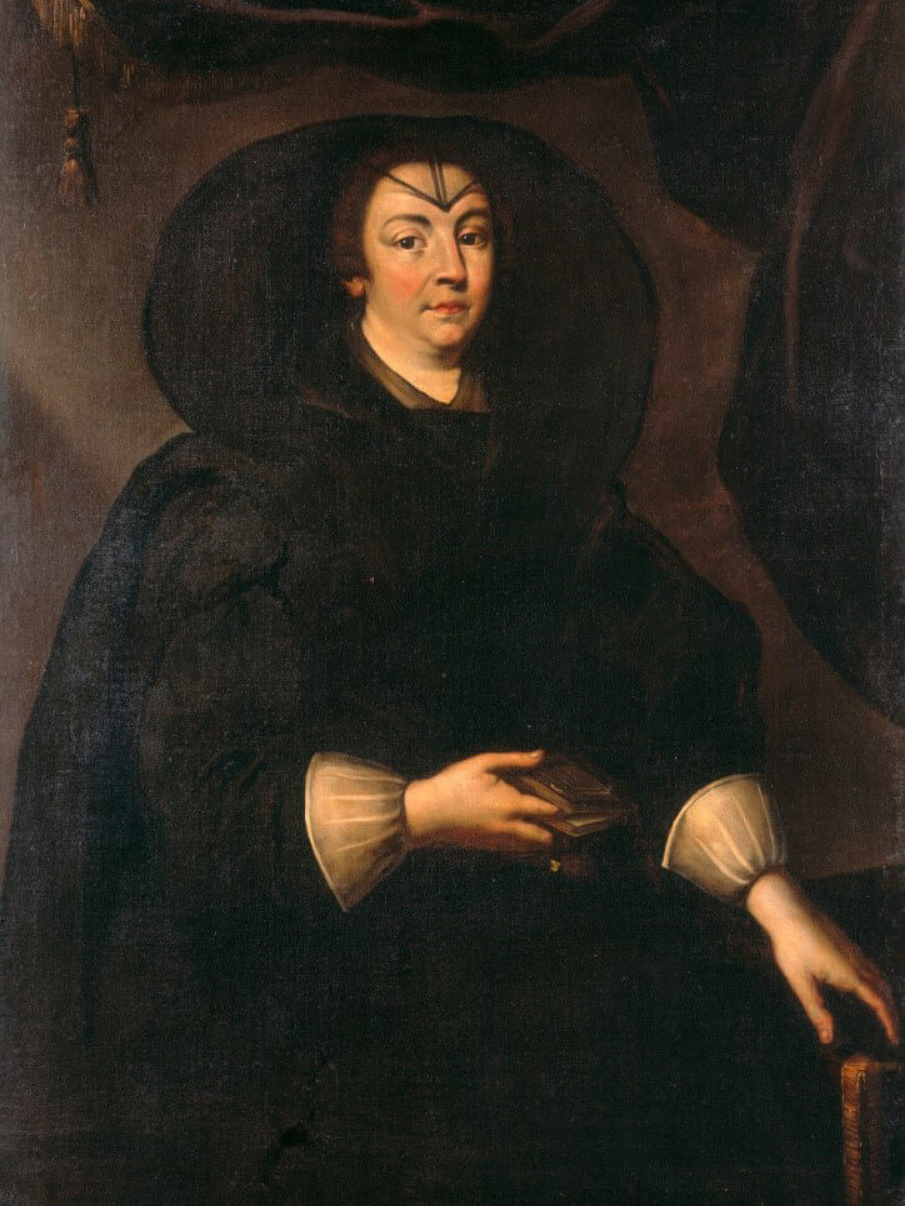
Pope Innocent X named the son, nephew, and cousin of his sister-in-law Olimpia Maidalchini to the curial office of the Cardinal Nephew.

The terms of the office of Cardinal Nephew were established by a papal brief developed and refined by Pius V's successors to Paul V (1605–1621). The Cardinal Nephew was also the correspondence liaison for all papal nuncios and gubernatorial legates, and the prefect for two congregations: the Consulta and the Congregazione del Buon Governo. The Cardinal Nephew was also the captain-general of the papal army and a "channel through which flowed benefices one way and gold the other".

However, these formal functions only came into force during the pontificates of unusually weak popes; most Cardinal Nephews were the de facto rubber stamp of the pontiff himself.

Although Pope Leo XI (1605) died before he was able to elevate his nephew, Roberto Ubaldini, Ubaldini was elevated by Leo XI's successor, Pope Paul V, in 1615.

Some historians consider Scipione Borghese, cardinal-nephew to Pope Paul V, to be the "prototypical representative" of a cardinal-nephew, unlike those before him, created to "provide for and oversee the permanent social and economic ascent of the reigning papal family into the ranks of the high Roman aristocracy". For example, in 1616, 24 of the 30 abbeys belonging to Borghese were rented out, a practice the Council of Trent had attempted to eliminate. A thorough financial analysis of Borghese's cardinalate by Volker Reinhardt (based on a series of extant account books) examines the strategies Borghese used to build up wealth during his uncle's pontificate and non-ecclesiastical assets before his uncle's death, which Volker considers to be exemplary of Baroque papal families. It is estimated that Paul V Borghese had transferred to his family approximately 4% of the total income of the Holy See during his pontificate. Borghese's personal revenues in 1610 were 153,000 scudi compared to the mere 4,900 scudi that constituted his entire family's income in 1592.

Pope Gregory XIV (1590–1591) began the practice of creating cardinal-nephews whose formal appointment coincided de facto with their nomination, and was thus separate from the ordinal process for creating cardinals, and when he fell ill, he authorized his cardinal-nephew, Paolo Emilio Sfondrato, to use the Fiat ut petitur, a power which was later diminished at the urging of the college. Paul V issued a motu proprio on April 30, 1618, formally bestowing on his cardinal-nephew the same authority Pope Clement VIII had given to Pietro Aldobrandini, beginning what historian Laurain-Portemer calls "l'age classique'" of nepotism.

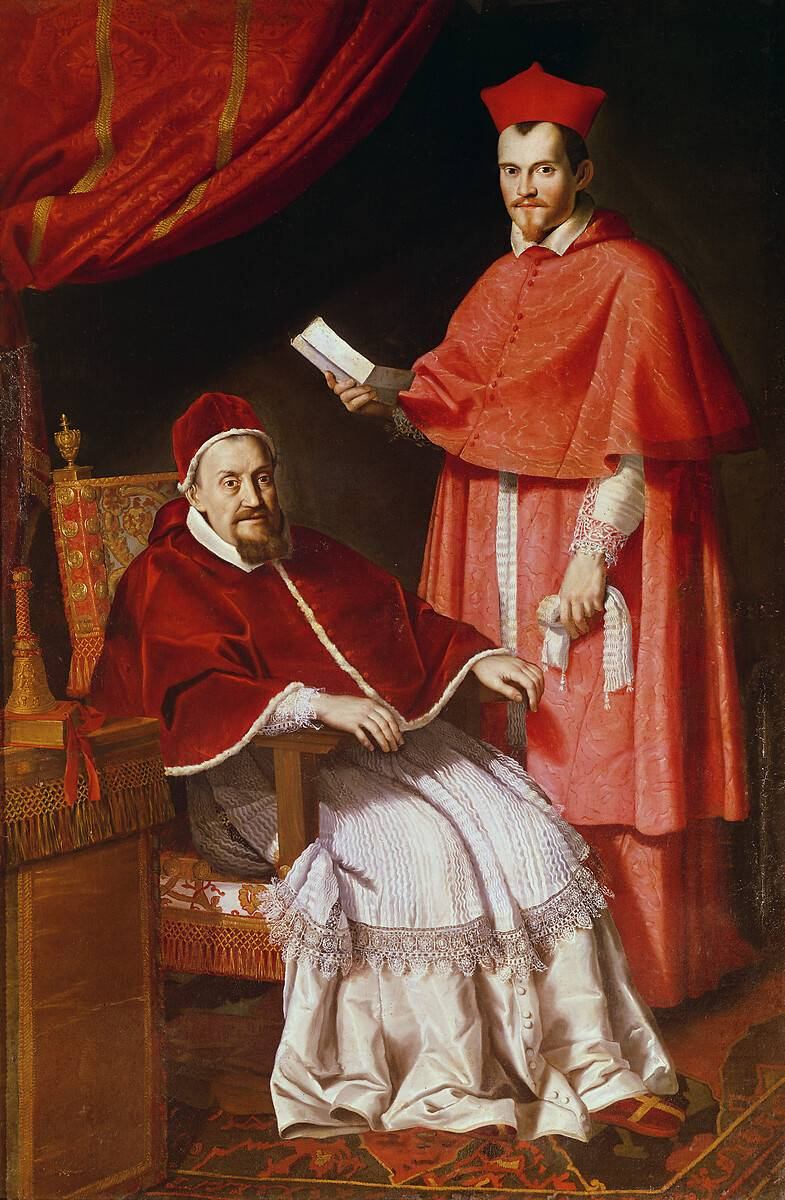
Pope Gregory XV with his Cardinal Nephew of unprecedented income and authority, Ludovico Ludovisi, known as il cardinale padrone

Pope Gregory XV's (1621–1623) cardinal-nephew, Ludovico Ludovisi, the first cardinal-nephew known as il cardinale padrone ("the Cardinal boss"), accumulated a vast array of benefices: the bishopric of Bologna, 23 abbeys, the directorship of the Apostolic Signatura, as well as the offices of the vice-chancellor and high-chamberlain, and was able to have most of them redistributed among 17 of his kinsmen upon his death. These benefices and offices netted Ludovisi more than 200,000 scudi annually, and he is considered to have exercised "more unlimited authority" than any previous cardinal-nephew. Notably, cardinal-nephews were allowed to create facultas testandi to will the rewards of their benefices to secular family members. Gregory XV's successor, Urban VIII (1623–1644) convened two special committees of theologians, both of whom endorsed this practice.

As Fabio Chigi, I had a family. As Alexander VII I have none. You won't find my name anywhere in the baptismal registers of Siena.

— Pope Alexander VII, 1655, who appointed two cardinal-nephews in 1657

Not all Cardinal Nephews were cardinal-nephews in the strictest sense. In fact, papal historian Valérie Pirie considers not having a nephew a "tremendous asset for a would-be Pope" as it left the position open for an ally cardinal. For example, Pope Clement X gave the office to Cardinal Paoluzzi-Altieri, whose nephew had recently married Laura Caterina Altieri, the sole heiress of Clement X's family. Many historians consider Olimpia Maidalchini, the sister-in-law of Pope Innocent X (1644–1655), to have been a de facto Cardinal Nephew; the position was formally held by her son, Camillo Pamphili, then her nephew, Francesco Maidalchini (after Pamphili renounced his cardinalate in order to wed), and (after Francesco proved incompetent) Camillo Astalli, her cousin.

Popes often had only a few choices for the creation of a Cardinal Nephew. According to papal historian Frederic Baumgartner, Pope Sixtus V's (1585–1590) reign "started badly" because Alessandro Peretti di Montalto was "his only nephew eligible for the office, but he could hardly serve the Pope as a trustworthy confidant", causing several cardinals to refuse to attend his investiture. Another papal historian Ludwig von Pastor notes that "the misfortune of Pope Pamphili was that the only person in his family who would have had the qualities necessary to fill such a position was a woman".

Pope Innocent XI (1676–1689) despised the practice and only accepted his election as pope after the College of Cardinals consented to his plans for reform, which included a ban on nepotism. However, Innocent XI backed down after thrice failing to achieve the support of the majority of his cardinals for a bull banning nepotism, which had been tediously composed between 1677 and 1686. Innocent XI refused entreaties from within the papal court to bring his only nephew, Livio Odescalchi, the prince of Sirmio, to Rome, although he did elevate Carlo Stefano Anastasio Ciceri, a distant relative, cardinal on September 2, 1686. Innocent XI's successor, Pope Alexander VIII (1689–1691), was the last pope to create a Cardinal Nephew. Alexander VIII also undid another reform of Innocent XI by restoring the revenues of the former Chancery to the Vice-Chancellor, who was, at the time, his cardinal-nephew, Pietro Ottoboni. Edith Standen, a consultant to the Metropolitan Museum of Art, calls Ottoboni the "last and certainly not least magnificent example" of the "splendor of an extinct species, the Cardinal-Nephew".

Until 1692 (and sometimes thereafter), the cardinal-nephew (or a lay nephew) would be the chief archivist of the pope, usually removing the archives to a family archive upon the death of the pontiff. In particular, the archival collections of the Barberini, Farnese, Chigi, and Borghese families contain important papal documents.

=== Since 1692 ===
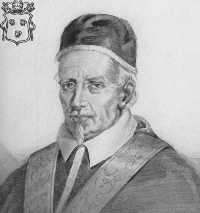
Pope Innocent XII abolished the curial office of the Cardinal Nephew on June 22, 1692, and strengthened the office of Cardinal Secretary of State.

Pope Innocent XII (1691–1700) issued a papal bull on June 22, 1692, Romanum decet pontificem, banning the office of Cardinal Nephew, limiting his successors to elevating only one cardinal relative, eliminating various sinecures traditionally reserved for cardinal-nephews, and capping the stipend or endowment the nephew of a pope could receive to 12,000 scudi. Romanum decet pontificem was later incorporated into the Code of Canon Law of 1917 in canons 240, 2; 1414, 4; and 1432, 1. In 1694, Innocent XII's series of reforms was concluded with an expensive campaign to eliminate the "venality" of offices while reimbursing their current holders. These reforms are viewed by some scholars as a delayed reaction to the financial crisis created by the nepotism of Pope Urban VIII (1623–1644).

However, even following Romanum decet pontificem, only three of the eight popes of the 18th century failed to make a nephew or brother cardinal. The College of Cardinals apparently preferred rule by nephews than by favorites, which they perceived as the alternative; for example, the college urged Pope Benedict XIII (1724–1730) to appoint a cardinal-nephew, who they hoped would replace Benedict XIII's notorious lieutenant Niccolò Coscia. Pope Gregory XIII (1572–1585) also had to be urged by key figures in the college to appoint his cardinal-nephew: Filippo Boncompagni.

The cardinal-nephews of the 18th century declined in influence as the power of the Cardinal Secretary of State increased. The church of Pope Benedict XIII is described by historian Eamon Duffy as "all the evils of nepotism without the nephew". Neri Maria Corsini, cardinal-nephew of Pope Clement XII (1730–1740), was by far the most powerful cardinal-nephew of the 18th century, on account of his uncle's advanced age and blindness. However, Clement XII's successor, Pope Benedict XIV (1740–1758), was described by Hugh Walpole as "a priest without indolence or interest, a prince without favorites, a Pope without nephews".

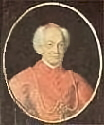
Giuseppe Pecci, the last papal relative elevated to cardinal

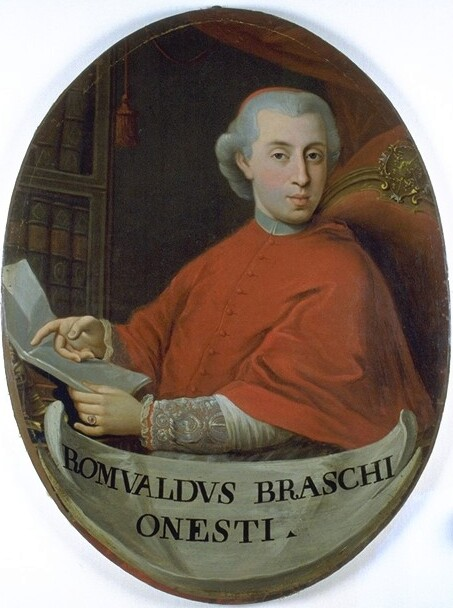
Romualdo Braschi-Onesti, the penultimate cardinal-nephew

Romoaldo Braschi-Onesti, cardinal-nephew of Pius VI (1775–1799), was the penultimate cardinal-nephew. Despite Pius VI's lineage to a noble Cesena family, his only sister had married a man from the poor Onesti family. Therefore, he commissioned a genealogist to discover (and inflate) some trace of nobility in the Onesti lineage, an endeavor which yielded only a circuitous connection to Saint Romualdo.

After the turbulent 1800 papal conclave, Pope Pius VII (1800–1823) shunned the institution of the cardinal-nephew and instead relied on his Cardinal Secretary of State, Ercole Consalvi. During the 19th century, the only nephew of a pope created cardinal was Gabriele della Genga Sermattei, nephew of Pope Leo XII, created cardinal by Pope Gregory XVI on February 1, 1836. Although the institutionalization of nepotism disappeared in the 18th century, "pietas" (duty to family) remained a theme of papal administration into the 20th century, although rarely with the overt intervention of a papal uncle. Following the example of Pius VI, Popes Leo XIII (who elevated his brother, Giuseppe Pecci, cardinal on May 12, 1879) and Pius XII (1939–1958) weakened the formal curial bureaucracy in favor of a parallel government, in which family members often figured prominently. The loss of temporal power over the Papal States (de facto in 1870 with the "Roman Question" and de jure in 1929 with the Lateran Treaty) also eliminated the structural conditions which had figured prominently in the family politics of earlier popes.

== Role in conclaves ==
A Pope's nephew dies twice; the second time like all men, the first time when his uncle dies.

— Cardinal Albani

Even into the 18th century, the cardinal-nephew was a natural power broker at the conclave following his uncle's death, as a figure whom cardinals desirous of continuing the status quo could rally around. In particular, the cardinal-nephew often commanded the loyalty of his uncle's creatures, whom he generally had a role in naming. For example, Alessandro Peretti di Montalto led his uncle's creatures in the papal conclave of 1590 despite being only 21. According to conclave historian Frederic Baumgartner, "the purpose of such appointments was ensuring that the Pope's family would have power and influence for a much longer time than the brief period that a Pope could expect to reign". A notable exception is Pope Gregory XV (1621–1623) who declined on his deathbed the request of Ludovico Ludovisi to name more relatives to the college, saying he had "enough to account to God for the unworthy ones he had appointed".

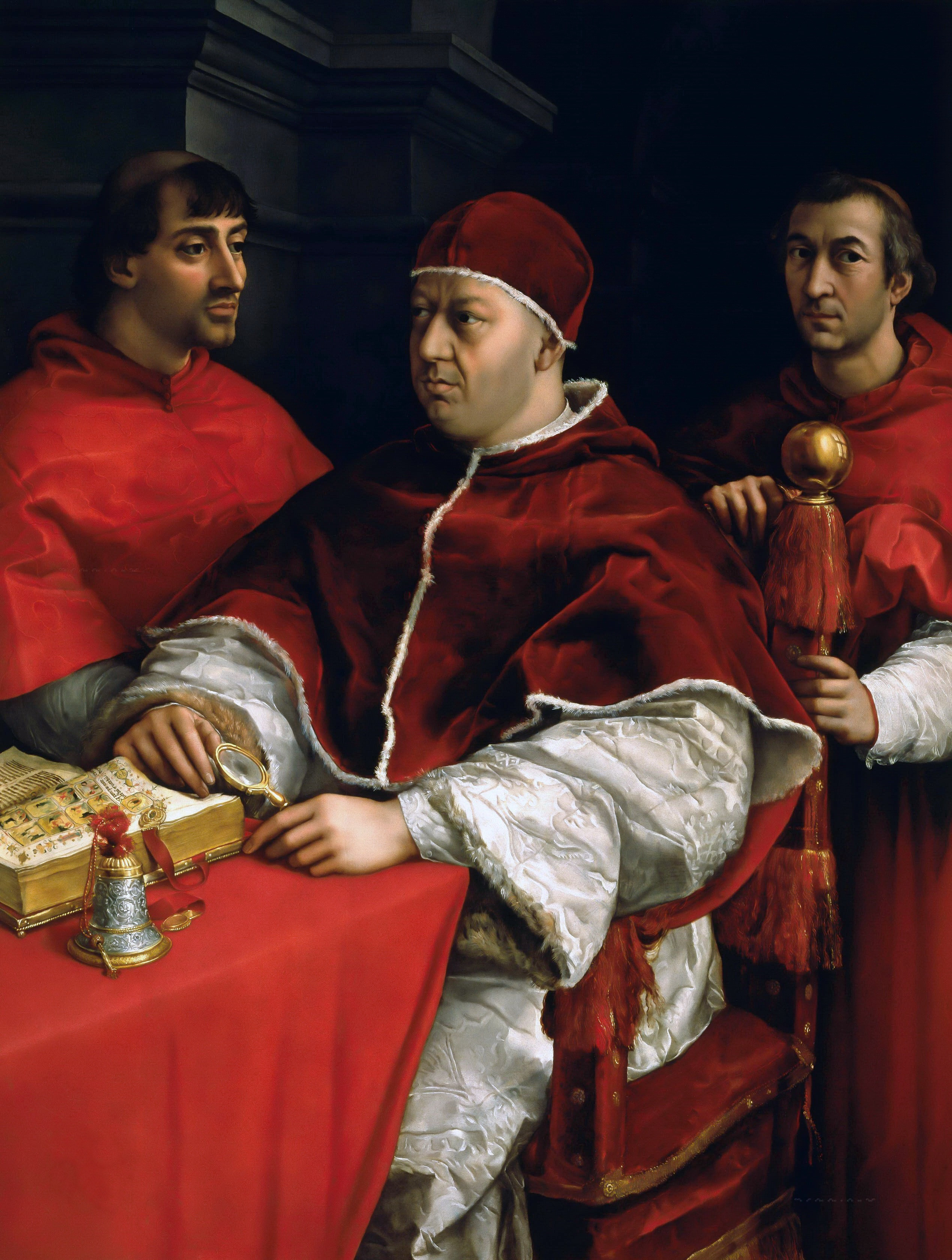
Pope Leo X with his cousins Giulio de' Medici (left, the future Pope Clement VII) and Luigi de' Rossi (right), whom he appointed as cardinals

However, cardinal-nephews were not guaranteed the leadership of their uncle's creatures; for example, in the papal conclave, 1621, Scipione Borghese could count only twenty-nine votes (a fraction of his uncle's fifty-six cardinals), Pietro Aldobrandini controlled only nine (of his uncle's thirteen remaining cardinals), and Montalto only five of his uncle's remaining cardinals. In fact, international rivalries sometimes overwhelmed family loyalties when cardinal-nephews were relatively "poorly organized". As Pope Innocent X (1644–1655) died with the office of Cardinal Nephew vacant, his faction proved divided and leaderless in the conclave, although his sister-in-law Olimpia Maidalchini was invited to address the cardinals from within the enclosure, the only woman ever so honored.

Instruzione al cardinal Padrone circa il modo come si deve procurare una fazione di cardinali con tutti i requisiti che deve avere per lo stabilimento della sua grandezza ("Instructions to the chief cardinal on how to create a faction of cardinals with all the requisites for the establishment of his grandeur"), discovered in the archive of the Santa Maria de Monserrato, offers advice to cardinal-nephews for consolidating power within the College of Cardinals. Another text, the Ricordi dati da Gregorio XV al cardinale Lodovisio suo nipote ("Memoir addressed by Gregory XV to his Nephew Cardinal Lodovisio"), offers advice for how to rise within the Curia.

An analysis of the five papal conclaves between 1605 and 1644 shows that cardinal-nephews were generally unsuccessful in electing their chosen candidates, although the victor was usually a cardinal created by the deceased pope. Crown-cardinals in particular, when they deigned to travel to Rome for the conclave, tended to oppose the election of cardinal-nephews, although they equally opposed the election of crown-cardinals of other monarchs. In general, a cardinal-nephew had to outlive one or more successors of his uncle to become regarded as papabile, both because of their youth and their tendency to be blamed for any unpopular papal policies of their uncles.

A papal election could bring a dramatic change of fortune for a cardinal-nephew, often bringing the former favorites into conflict with the new pope. For example, Prospero Colonna and Francisco de Borja were excommunicated, and Carlo Carafa was executed. The papal conclave, May 1605, is one example of a conclave where a candidate (Antonmaria Sauli) was defeated because enough other cardinals were convinced of the need for "a Pope willing to punish the cardinal-nephews for robbing the papacy". A cardinal-nephew was also a potential threat to any future pontiff; for example, Ludovisi came to lead the opposition against Pope Urban VIII (1623–1644), even talking about calling a council against the pope (which never occurred as Ludovisi died in 1632) because "no one else had the standing to confront Urban's titanic temper".

== Legacy ==
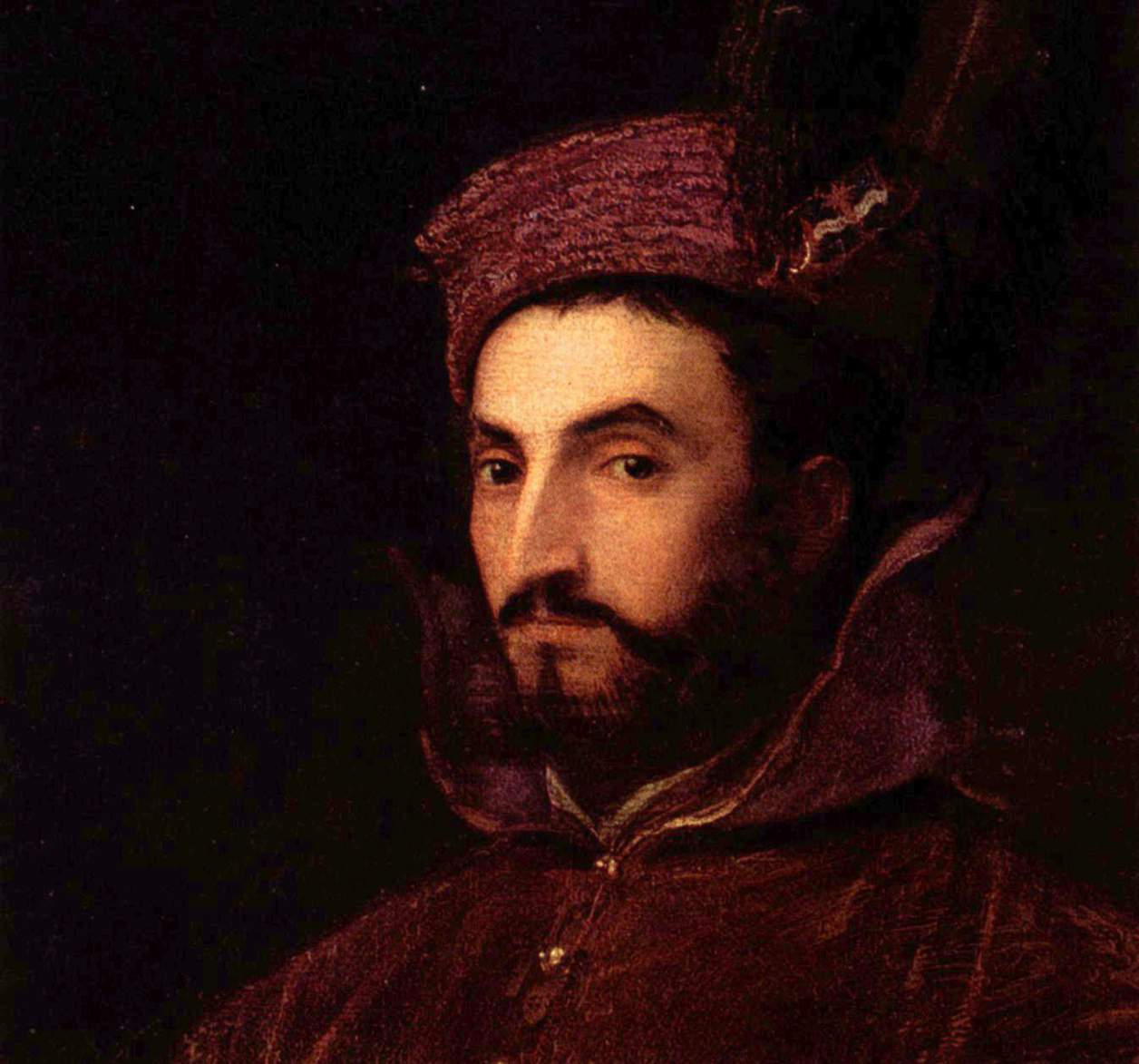
Ippolito de' Medici, cardinal-nephew of Pope Clement VII and illegitimate son of Giuliano di Lorenzo de' Medici

Nepotism is a common feature in the history of governance, particularly in cultures where identity and loyalty are determined more at the level of the family than that of the nation-state. The use of nephews, rather than direct descendants, is a product of the tradition of clerical celibacy within the Catholic Church, although hereditary descent from uncles to nephews is also seen in the patriarchate of the Assyrian Church of the East.

The creation of relatives and known-allies as cardinals was only one way in which medieval and Renaissance popes attempted to dilute the power of the College of Cardinals as an "ecclesiastical rival" and perpetuate their influence within the church after their death. The institution of the cardinal-nephew had the effect both of enriching the pope's family with desirable benefices and of modernizing the administration of the papacy, by allowing the pontiff to rule through a proxy which was more easily deemed fallible when necessary and provided a formal distance between the person of the pontiff and the everydayness of pontifical affairs.

Gregorio Leti's Papal Nepotism, or the True Relation of the Reasons Which Impel the Popes to make their Nephews Powerful (1667) is one example of contemporary criticism of the institution of the cardinal-nephew; Leti holds the rare distinction of having all of his publications on the Index Librorum Prohibitorum ("List of Prohibited Books"). The Catholic Encyclopedia of 1913 defended the institution of the cardinal-nephew as a necessary countermeasure to the intrigue of the old Church. According to Francis A. Burkle-Young, 15th-century popes in particular found it necessary to elevate their relatives to the College of Cardinals due to their distrust of the crown-cardinals, Roman baronial families, and Italian princely families who also populated the college. According to Thomas Adolphus Trollope, a famed papal historian:

"...the evil wrought by them in and to the church has been well nigh fatal to it; and it continued to increase until increasing danger warned the Pontiffs to abstain. The worst cardinals, providing, of course, the material for the worst Popes, have been for the most part cardinal-nephews, the temptation to the creation of such having been rendered too great to be resisted by the exorbitant greatness of the power, dignity, and wealth attributed to the members of the Sacred College. The value of these great "prizes" was so enormous, that the "hat" became an object of ambition to princes, and it was the primary object with a long series of Popes to bestow it on their kinsmen."

=== Cardinal Secretary of State ===
The curial office of Cardinal Secretary of State in many ways evolved from the roles formerly filled by cardinal-nephews. From 1644 to 1692, the power of the Cardinal Secretary of State was essentially inversely proportional to that of the Cardinal Nephew, to whom the Secretariat was subordinate. During some pontificates, for example that of Pope Pius V (1566–1572) and his nephew Michele Bonelli, the cardinal-nephew and secretary of state were one and the same.

According to Baumgartner, "the rise of a centralized administration with professional bureaucrats with careers in the papal service" proved more effective than nepotism for future popes and thus "greatly reduced the need for papal nephews". The rise of the Cardinal Secretary of State was the "most obvious element of this new approach".

== See also ==
- List of cardinal-nephews
- Favourite
- Captain General of the Church
- Lay cardinal

== Bibliography ==
- Baumgartner, Frederic J. 2003. Behind Locked Doors: A History of the Papal Elections. Palgrave Macmillan. ISBN 0-312-29463-8.
- Brixius, J. M. Die Mitglieder des Kardinalkollegiums von 1130–1181, Berlin 1912. (in German)
- Carocci, Sandro (1999). Il nepotismo nel Medioevo: papi, cardinali e famiglie nobili (in Italian). Roma: Viella. ISBN 978-88-85669-82-6.
- Chadwick, Owen. 1981. The Popes and European Revolution. Oxford University Press. ISBN 0-19-826919-6.
- Cowan, H. Lee. Cardinal Giovanni Battista De Luca: Nepotism in the Seventeenth-century Catholic Church and De Luca's Efforts to Prohibit the Practice. Denton, Texas. UNT Digital Library. https://digital.library.unt.edu/ark:/67531/metadc149577/. [dissertation: University of North Texas]
- Duffy, Eamon. 2006. Saints & Sinners: A History of the Popes. Yale University Press. ISBN 0-300-11597-0.
- Ekelund, Robert B., Jr., Herbert, Robert F., and Tollison, Robert D. 2004, October. "The Economics of the Counter-Reformation: Incumbent-Firm reaction to market entry". Economic Inquiry. 42 (4): 690–705.
- Emich, Birgit (2020), "The Cardinal Nephew", chapter 5 of Companion to the Early Modern Cardinal. In Mary Hollingsworth, Miles Pattenden and Arnold Witte (eds). Leiden/Boston: Brill, 71–87. ISBN 978-90-04-41544-7
- Hill, Michael (1998). "Scipione Borghese and the Office of Cardinal Nephew," chapter 1 of Cardinal Scipione Borghese's Patronage of Ecclesiastical Architecture (1605–33). PhD, University of Sydney, 1998
- Hsia, Ronnie Po-chia. 2005. The World of Catholic Renewal, 1540–1770. Cambridge University Press. ISBN 0-521-84154-2.
- Hüls, R. Kardinäle, Klerus und Kirchen Roms: 1049–1130, Tübingen 1977. (in German)
- Kraus, Andreas (1958), "Amt und Stellung des Kardinalnepoten zur Zeit Urbans. VIII (1623)", Römische Quartalschrift für christliche Altertumskunde und Kirchengeschichte, 53 (1958),
- Klewitz, H.W. Reformpapsttum und Kardinalkolleg, Darmstadt 1957. (in German)
- Leti, Gregorio (1669). William Aglionby, tr. (ed.). Il Nipotismo Di Roma; Or, the History of the Popes' Nephews from the Times of Sixtus the IV. to the Death of the Last Pope, Alexander the VII. ... Written Originally in Italian [by Gregorio Leti] in the Year 1667, and Englished by W.A. London: John Starkey.
- Maleczek, W. Papst und Kardinalskolleg von 1191 bis 1216, Vienna 1984. (in German)
- Moresco, Mattia (1928). Il nepotismo di Sisto 4. e le capitolazioni elettorali: nota di Mattia Moresco (in Italian). Genoa: Artigianelli.*Philippe Levillain, ed. 2002. The Papacy: An Encyclopedia. Routledge. ISBN 0-415-92228-3.
- Setton, Kenneth Meyer. 1984. The Papacy and the Levant (1204–1571). ISBN 0-87169-114-0.
- Trollope, Thomas Adolphus. 1876. The papal conclaves, as they were and as they are. Chapman and Hall.
- Signorotto, Gianvittorio, and Visceglia, Maria Antonietta. 2002. Court and Politics in Papal Rome, 1492–1700. Cambridge University Press. ISBN 0-521-64146-2.
- Williams, George L. 2004. Papal Genealogy: The Families and Descendants of the Popes. McFarland. ISBN 0-7864-2071-5.
- Zenker, B. Die Mitglieder des Kardinalkollegiums von 1130 bis 1159, Würzburg 1964. (in German)
