= Cymindis dubia =

Scientific classification
- Domain: Eukaryota
- Kingdom: Animalia
- Phylum: Arthropoda
- Class: Insecta
- Order: Coleoptera
- Suborder: Adephaga
- Family: Carabidae
- Genus: Cymindis
- Species: C. dubia

Binomial name
- Cymindis dubia Ballion, 1878

Species of beetle

Cymindis dubia is a species of ground beetle in the subfamily Harpalinae. It was described by Ernst von Ballion in 1878.
