= Ballon =

Ballon may refer to:

== Places ==
- Ballon, County Carlow, Ireland, a village
- Grand Ballon, the apex of the Vosges Mountains in France
- Ballon, Charente-Maritime, France, a commune
- Ballon, Sarthe, France, a former commune
  - Ballon-Saint Mars, incorporating the former commune

== Others ==
- Ballon (ballet), the appearance of being lightweight and light-footed while jumping
- Ballon (surname), with a list of people of this name

== See also ==
- Balloon (disambiguation)
- Balon (disambiguation)
