= Ballion =

Ballion is a surname. Notable people with the name include:

- Ernst von Ballion (1816–1901), Russian entomologist
- Susan Ballion or Siouxsie Sioux (born 1957), English singer, songwriter and musician

== See also ==
- Ballon (surname)
