= Maladera renardi =

Scientific classification
- Kingdom: Animalia
- Phylum: Arthropoda
- Class: Insecta
- Order: Coleoptera
- Suborder: Polyphaga
- Infraorder: Scarabaeiformia
- Family: Scarabaeidae
- Genus: Maladera
- Species: M. renardi

Binomial name
- Maladera renardi (Ballion, 1871)

Synonyms
- Serica renardi Ballion, 1871; Maladera sibirica Dalla Torre, 1912; Serica delicta Brenske, 1898; Serica sibirica Brenske, 1898

Species of beetle

Maladera renardi is a species of beetle of the family Scarabaeidae. It is found in China (Heilongjiang, Jilin, Liaoning, Nei Mongol), Japan, Korea and the Russian Far East.

== Description ==
Adults reach a length of about 8.1 mm. They have an oblong blackish brown body. The antennae are yellowishand there are a few short setae on the head and sides of the elytra.
