= Ballon (surname) =

Ballon is a surname. Notable people with the name include:

- Claude Ballon (1671–1744), French dancer and choreographer
- Ellen Ballon (1898–1969), Canadian pianist
- Hamelin de Ballon (c. 1060 – 1105/1106), early Norman Baron
- Ian C. Ballon, Internet and intellectual property litigator
- Josepmir Ballón (born 1988), Peruvian footballer
- Pieter Ballon, Belgian historian and communications scholar
- Wynebald de Ballon (c. 1058 – c. 1126), early Norman magnate

== See also ==
- Balon (surname)
- Ballion, surname
