= Balon =

Balon may refer to:

- Baloň, a village and municipality in the Trnava Region of southwest Slovakia
- Balon (surname)
- Balon Greyjoy, a character in A Song of Ice and Fire
- Balon, a hibernation factor protein

== See also ==
- Ballon (disambiguation)
- Balon's ruffe, a species of freshwater ray-finned fish
