= Cymindis lindbergi =

Scientific classification
- Domain: Eukaryota
- Kingdom: Animalia
- Phylum: Arthropoda
- Class: Insecta
- Order: Coleoptera
- Suborder: Adephaga
- Family: Carabidae
- Genus: Cymindis
- Species: C. lindbergi

Binomial name
- Cymindis lindbergi Mateu, 1956

Species of ground beetle

Cymindis lindbergi is a species of ground beetle in the subfamily Harpalinae. It was described by Mateu in 1956.
