= Cymindis uyguricus =

Scientific classification
- Domain: Eukaryota
- Kingdom: Animalia
- Phylum: Arthropoda
- Class: Insecta
- Order: Coleoptera
- Suborder: Adephaga
- Family: Carabidae
- Genus: Cymindis
- Species: C. uyguricus

Binomial name
- Cymindis uyguricus B. Gueorguiev, 2000

Species of beetle

Cymindis uyguricus is a species of ground beetle in the subfamily Harpalinae. It was described by B. Gueorguiev in 2000.
