= Cymindis faldermanni =

Scientific classification
- Domain: Eukaryota
- Kingdom: Animalia
- Phylum: Arthropoda
- Class: Insecta
- Order: Coleoptera
- Suborder: Adephaga
- Family: Carabidae
- Genus: Cymindis
- Species: C. faldermanni

Binomial name
- Cymindis faldermanni Gistel, 1838

Species of beetle

Cymindis faldermanni is a species of ground beetle in the subfamily Harpalinae. It was described by Johannes von Nepomuk Franz Xaver Gistel in 1838.
