= Cymindis impressa =

Scientific classification
- Kingdom: Animalia
- Phylum: Arthropoda
- Class: Insecta
- Order: Coleoptera
- Suborder: Adephaga
- Family: Carabidae
- Genus: Cymindis
- Species: C. impressa

Binomial name
- Cymindis impressa Reitter, 1893

Species of beetle

Cymindis impressa is a species of ground beetle in the subfamily Harpalinae. It was described by Reitter in 1893.
