= Cymindis evanescens =

Scientific classification
- Kingdom: Animalia
- Phylum: Arthropoda
- Class: Insecta
- Order: Coleoptera
- Suborder: Adephaga
- Family: Carabidae
- Genus: Cymindis
- Species: C. evanescens

Binomial name
- Cymindis evanescens Casey, 1913

Species of beetle

Cymindis evanescens is a species of ground beetle in the subfamily Harpalinae. It was described by Casey in 1913.
