= Cymindis maderae =

Scientific classification
- Domain: Eukaryota
- Kingdom: Animalia
- Phylum: Arthropoda
- Class: Insecta
- Order: Coleoptera
- Suborder: Adephaga
- Family: Carabidae
- Genus: Cymindis
- Species: C. maderae

Binomial name
- Cymindis maderae Wollaston, 1857

Species of beetle

Cymindis maderae is a species of ground beetle in the subfamily Harpalinae. It was described by Thomas Vernon Wollaston in 1857.
