= Cymindis rufescens =

Scientific classification
- Domain: Eukaryota
- Kingdom: Animalia
- Phylum: Arthropoda
- Class: Insecta
- Order: Coleoptera
- Suborder: Adephaga
- Family: Carabidae
- Genus: Cymindis
- Species: C. rufescens

Binomial name
- Cymindis rufescens Gebler, 1845

Species of beetle

Cymindis rufescens is a species of ground beetle in the subfamily Harpalinae. It was described by Gebler in 1845.
