= Cymindis planipennis =

Scientific classification
- Domain: Eukaryota
- Kingdom: Animalia
- Phylum: Arthropoda
- Class: Insecta
- Order: Coleoptera
- Suborder: Adephaga
- Family: Carabidae
- Genus: Cymindis
- Species: C. planipennis

Binomial name
- Cymindis planipennis LeConte, 1863

Species of beetle

Cymindis planipennis is a species of ground beetle in the subfamily Harpalinae. It was described by John Lawrence LeConte in 1863.
