= Cymindis decora =

Scientific classification
- Domain: Eukaryota
- Kingdom: Animalia
- Phylum: Arthropoda
- Class: Insecta
- Order: Coleoptera
- Suborder: Adephaga
- Family: Carabidae
- Genus: Cymindis
- Species: C. decora

Binomial name
- Cymindis decora Fischer Von Waldheim, 1829

Species of beetle

Cymindis decora is a species of ground beetle in the subfamily Harpalinae. It was described by Fischer Von Waldheim in 1829.
