= Cymindis persica =

Scientific classification
- Domain: Eukaryota
- Kingdom: Animalia
- Phylum: Arthropoda
- Class: Insecta
- Order: Coleoptera
- Suborder: Adephaga
- Family: Carabidae
- Genus: Cymindis
- Species: C. persica

Binomial name
- Cymindis persica Jedlicka, 1968

Species of beetle

Cymindis persica is a species of ground beetle in the subfamily Harpalinae. It was described by Jedlicka in 1968.
