= Cymindis abeillei =

Scientific classification
- Domain: Eukaryota
- Kingdom: Animalia
- Phylum: Arthropoda
- Class: Insecta
- Order: Coleoptera
- Suborder: Adephaga
- Family: Carabidae
- Genus: Cymindis
- Species: C. abeillei

Binomial name
- Cymindis abeillei Jeannel, 1942

Species of ground beetle

Cymindis abeillei is a species of ground beetle in the subfamily Harpalinae. It was described by Jeannel in 1942.
