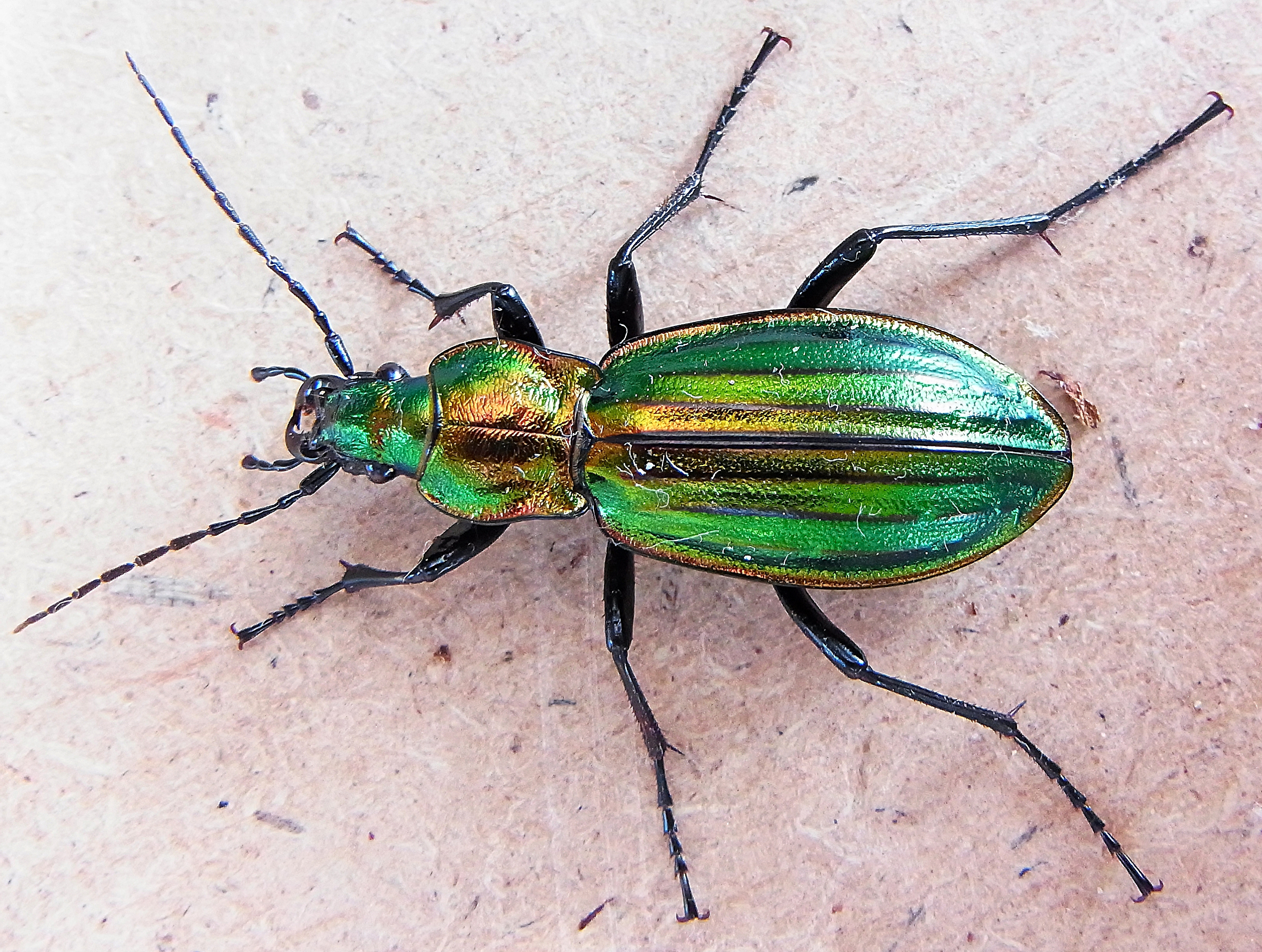

Scientific classification
- Domain: Eukaryota
- Kingdom: Animalia
- Phylum: Arthropoda
- Class: Insecta
- Order: Coleoptera
- Suborder: Adephaga
- Family: Carabidae
- Subfamily: Lebiinae
- Tribe: Lebiini
- Subtribe: Cymindidina
- Genus: Cymindis
- Species: C. lineata

Binomial name
- Cymindis lineata (Quensel, 1806)

Synonyms
- Carabus lineatus Dejean, 1826; Carabus basilicus Chevrolat, 1836

= Cymindis lineata =

Species of beetle

Cymindis lineata is a species of ground beetle in the family Carabidae. It is found in the Palearctic.
