= Cymindis adusta =

Scientific classification
- Domain: Eukaryota
- Kingdom: Animalia
- Phylum: Arthropoda
- Class: Insecta
- Order: Coleoptera
- Suborder: Adephaga
- Family: Carabidae
- Genus: Cymindis
- Species: C. adusta

Binomial name
- Cymindis adusta L. Redtenbacher, 1843

Species of ground beetle

Cymindis adusta is a species of ground beetle in the subfamily Harpalinae. It was described by L. Redtenbacher in 1843.
