= Cymindis elegans =

Scientific classification
- Domain: Eukaryota
- Kingdom: Animalia
- Phylum: Arthropoda
- Class: Insecta
- Order: Coleoptera
- Suborder: Adephaga
- Family: Carabidae
- Genus: Cymindis
- Species: C. elegans

Binomial name
- Cymindis elegans LeConte, 1848

Species of beetle

Cymindis elegans is a ground beetle species in the genus Cymindis, in the subfamily Lebiinae and tribe Lebiini. It is found in Virginia in the United States.
