= Cymindis sabulosa =

Scientific classification
- Domain: Eukaryota
- Kingdom: Animalia
- Phylum: Arthropoda
- Class: Insecta
- Order: Coleoptera
- Suborder: Adephaga
- Family: Carabidae
- Genus: Cymindis
- Species: C. sabulosa

Binomial name
- Cymindis sabulosa (Motschulsky, 1850)

Species of beetle

Cymindis sabulosa is a species of ground beetle in the subfamily Harpalinae. It was described by Victor Motschulsky in 1850.
