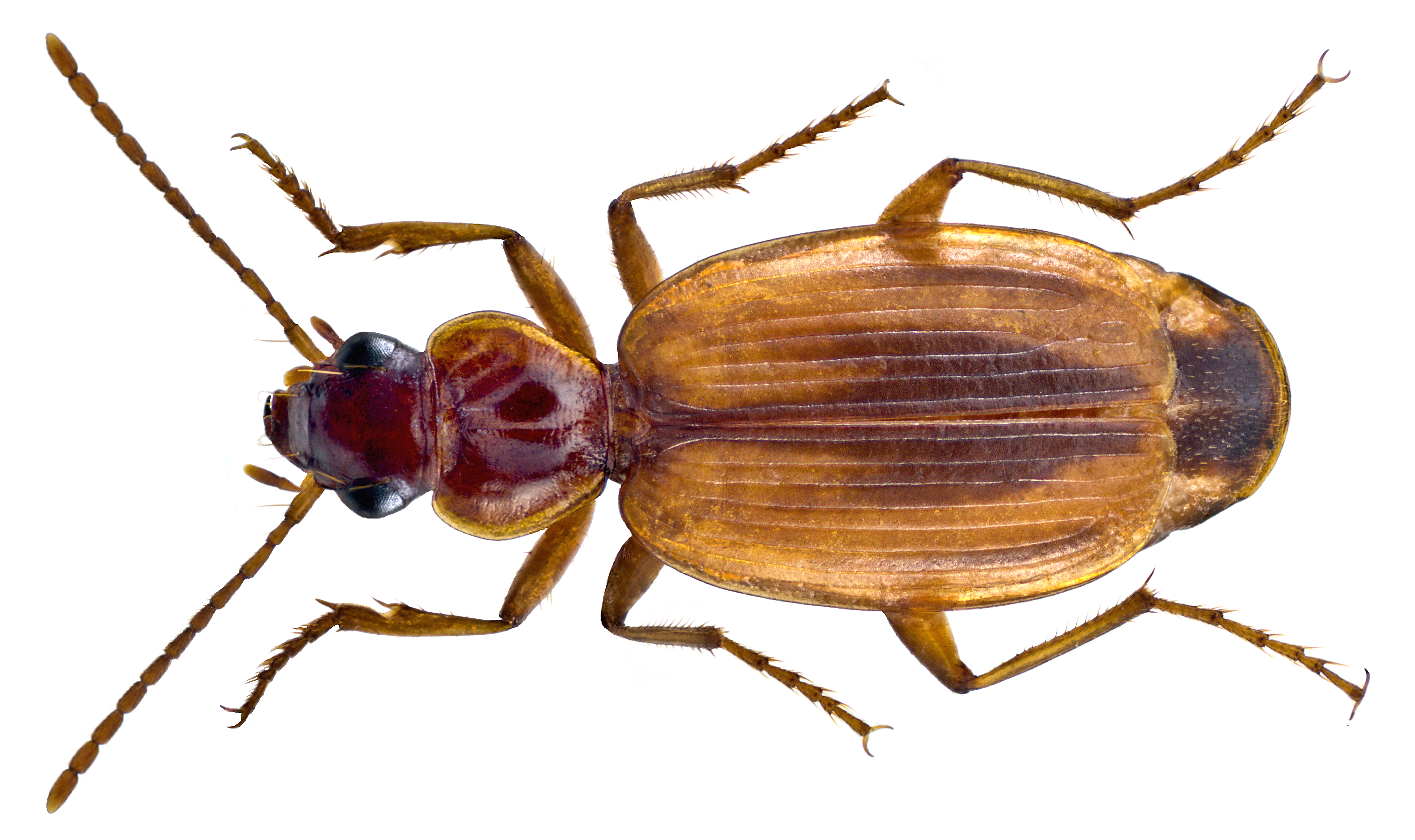

Scientific classification
- Domain: Eukaryota
- Kingdom: Animalia
- Phylum: Arthropoda
- Class: Insecta
- Order: Coleoptera
- Suborder: Adephaga
- Family: Carabidae
- Genus: Cymindis
- Species: C. moralesi

Binomial name
- Cymindis moralesi Mateu, 1979

= Cymindis moralesi =

Species of beetle

Cymindis moralesi is a species of ground beetle in the subfamily Harpalinae. It was described by Mateu in 1979.
