= Cymindis laticollis =

Scientific classification
- Domain: Eukaryota
- Kingdom: Animalia
- Phylum: Arthropoda
- Class: Insecta
- Order: Coleoptera
- Suborder: Adephaga
- Family: Carabidae
- Genus: Cymindis
- Species: C. laticollis

Binomial name
- Cymindis laticollis Say, 1830

Species of beetle

Cymindis laticollis is a species of ground beetle in the subfamily Harpalinae. It was described by Thomas Say in 1830.
