= Cymindis kocheri =

Scientific classification
- Domain: Eukaryota
- Kingdom: Animalia
- Phylum: Arthropoda
- Class: Insecta
- Order: Coleoptera
- Suborder: Adephaga
- Family: Carabidae
- Genus: Cymindis
- Species: C. kocheri

Binomial name
- Cymindis kocheri Antoine, 1939

Species of beetle

Cymindis kocheri is a species of ground beetle in the subfamily Harpalinae. It was described by Antoine in 1939.
