= Cymindis angularis =

Scientific classification
- Kingdom: Animalia
- Phylum: Arthropoda
- Class: Insecta
- Order: Coleoptera
- Suborder: Adephaga
- Family: Carabidae
- Genus: Cymindis
- Species: C. angularis

Binomial name
- Cymindis angularis Gyllenhal, 1810

Species of ground beetle

Cymindis angularis is a species of ground beetle in the subfamily Harpalinae. It was described by Gyllenhal in 1810.
