= Cymindis caudangula =

Scientific classification
- Domain: Eukaryota
- Kingdom: Animalia
- Phylum: Arthropoda
- Class: Insecta
- Order: Coleoptera
- Suborder: Adephaga
- Family: Carabidae
- Genus: Cymindis
- Species: C. caudangula

Binomial name
- Cymindis caudangula Kabak, 1997

Species of beetle

Cymindis caudangula is a species of ground beetle in the subfamily Harpalinae. It was described by Kabak in 1997.
