= Cymindis lineola =

Scientific classification
- Kingdom: Animalia
- Phylum: Arthropoda
- Clade: Pancrustacea
- Class: Insecta
- Order: Coleoptera
- Suborder: Adephaga
- Family: Carabidae
- Genus: Cymindis
- Species: C. lineola

Binomial name
- Cymindis lineola L. Dufour, 1820

Species of beetle

Cymindis lineola is a species of ground beetle in the subfamily Harpalinae. It was described by L. Dufour in 1820.
