= Cymindis avenae =

Scientific classification
- Domain: Eukaryota
- Kingdom: Animalia
- Phylum: Arthropoda
- Class: Insecta
- Order: Coleoptera
- Suborder: Adephaga
- Family: Carabidae
- Genus: Cymindis
- Species: C. avenae

Binomial name
- Cymindis avenae J. R. Sahlberg, 1908

Species of ground beetle

Cymindis avenae is a species of ground beetle in the subfamily Harpalinae. It was described by J. R. Sahlberg in 1908.
