= Cymindis aradensis =

Scientific classification
- Domain: Eukaryota
- Kingdom: Animalia
- Phylum: Arthropoda
- Class: Insecta
- Order: Coleoptera
- Suborder: Adephaga
- Family: Carabidae
- Genus: Cymindis
- Species: C. aradensis

Binomial name
- Cymindis aradensis Kirschenhofer, 1984

Species of ground beetle

Cymindis aradensis is a species of ground beetle in the subfamily Harpalinae. It was described by Kirschenhofer in 1984.
