= Cymindis paivana =

Scientific classification
- Kingdom: Animalia
- Phylum: Arthropoda
- Class: Insecta
- Order: Coleoptera
- Suborder: Adephaga
- Family: Carabidae
- Genus: Cymindis
- Species: C. paivana

Binomial name
- Cymindis paivana Wollaston, 1860

Species of beetle

Cymindis paivana is a species of ground beetle in the subfamily Harpalinae, first described by Thomas Vernon Wollaston in 1860. it belongs to the genus Cymindis a widely distributed group of ground beetles found across the Holarctic, near East, and parts of the north Africa EOL. Members of this genus typically inhabit moist terrestrial environments, which include, forests and grasslands, and they are nocturnal predators that consume invertebrates.
