= Cymindis arizonensis =

Scientific classification
- Domain: Eukaryota
- Kingdom: Animalia
- Phylum: Arthropoda
- Class: Insecta
- Order: Coleoptera
- Suborder: Adephaga
- Family: Carabidae
- Genus: Cymindis
- Species: C. arizonensis

Binomial name
- Cymindis arizonensis Schaeffer, 1910

Species of ground beetle

Cymindis arizonensis is a species of ground beetle in the subfamily Harpalinae. It was described by Schaeffer in 1910.
