= Cymindis etrusca =

Scientific classification
- Domain: Eukaryota
- Kingdom: Animalia
- Phylum: Arthropoda
- Class: Insecta
- Order: Coleoptera
- Suborder: Adephaga
- Family: Carabidae
- Genus: Cymindis
- Species: C. etrusca

Binomial name
- Cymindis etrusca Bassi, 1834

Species of beetle

Cymindis etrusca is a species of ground beetle in the subfamily Harpalinae. It was described by M. C. Bassi in 1834.
