= Cymindis favieri =

Scientific classification
- Kingdom: Animalia
- Phylum: Arthropoda
- Class: Insecta
- Order: Coleoptera
- Suborder: Adephaga
- Family: Carabidae
- Genus: Cymindis
- Species: C. favieri

Binomial name
- Cymindis favieri Fairmaire, 1859

Species of beetle

Cymindis favieri is a species of ground beetle in the subfamily Harpalinae. It was described by Fairmaire in 1859.
