= Cymindis facchinii =

Scientific classification
- Domain: Eukaryota
- Kingdom: Animalia
- Phylum: Arthropoda
- Class: Insecta
- Order: Coleoptera
- Suborder: Adephaga
- Family: Carabidae
- Genus: Cymindis
- Species: C. facchinii

Binomial name
- Cymindis facchinii Kabak, 2006

Species of beetle

Cymindis facchinii is a species of ground beetle in the subfamily Harpalinae. It was described by Kabak in 2006 and is endemic to India where it is found in Kashmir and Sonamarg provinces.
