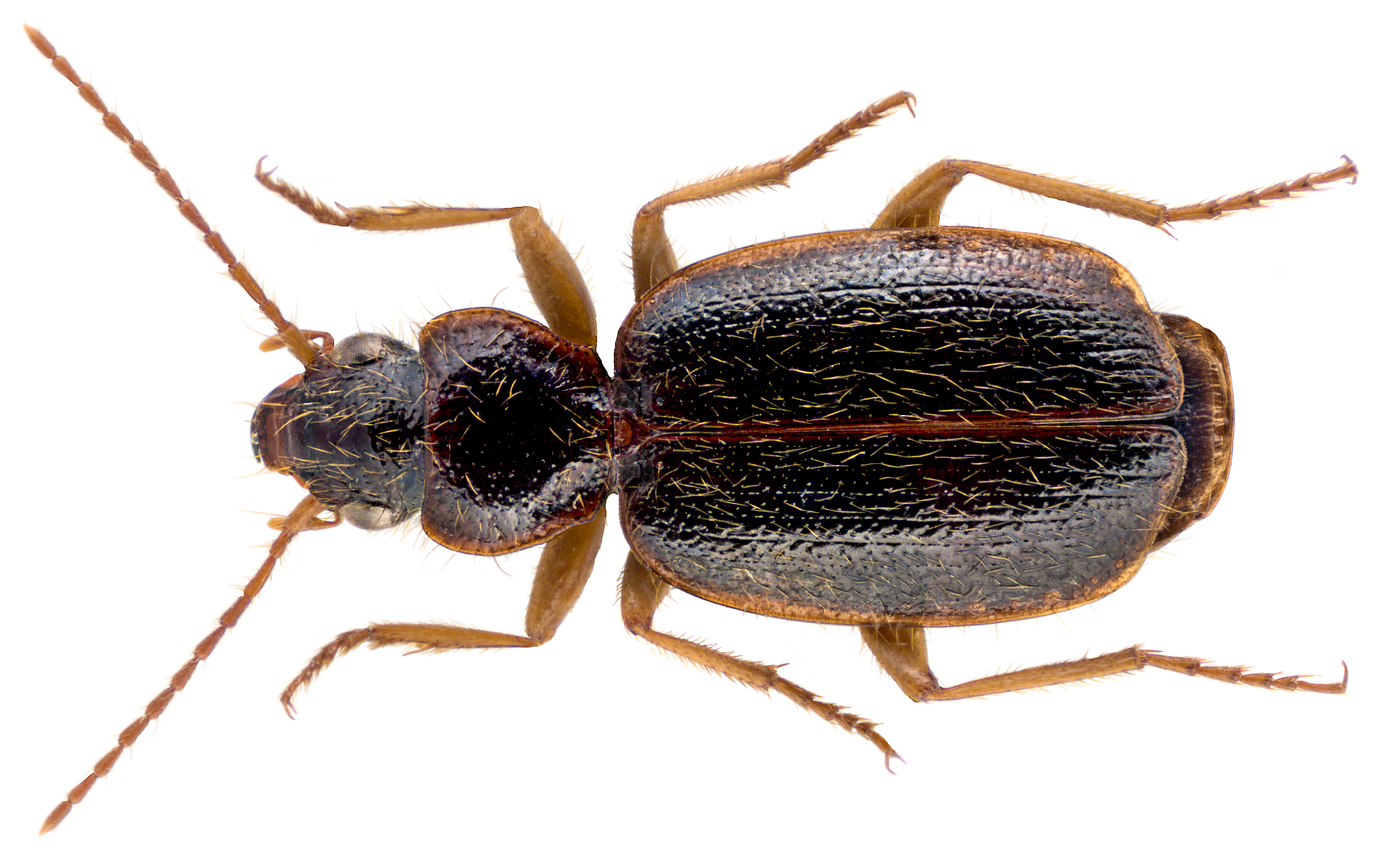

Scientific classification
- Domain: Eukaryota
- Kingdom: Animalia
- Phylum: Arthropoda
- Class: Insecta
- Order: Coleoptera
- Suborder: Adephaga
- Family: Carabidae
- Genus: Cymindis
- Species: C. cincta

Binomial name
- Cymindis cincta Brulle, 1839

= Cymindis cincta =

Species of beetle

Cymindis cincta is a species of ground beetle in the subfamily Harpalinae. It was described by Brulle in 1839.

== Location ==
Cymindis Cincta is recorded to be found in Spain, Canary Islands, Gran Canaria and Mogán.
