= Cymindis solskii =

Scientific classification
- Kingdom: Animalia
- Phylum: Arthropoda
- Clade: Pancrustacea
- Class: Insecta
- Order: Coleoptera
- Suborder: Adephaga
- Family: Carabidae
- Subfamily: Lebiinae
- Tribe: Lebiini
- Subtribe: Cymindidina
- Genus: Cymindis
- Species: C. solskii

Binomial name
- Cymindis solskii Tschitscherine, 1896

Synonyms
- Cymindis solskii

Species of beetle

Cymindis solskii is a species in the beetle family Carabidae. It is found in Uzbekistan and Tajikistan.
