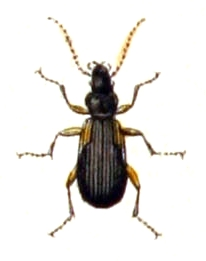
- Cymindis humeralis

Scientific classification
- Domain: Eukaryota
- Kingdom: Animalia
- Phylum: Arthropoda
- Class: Insecta
- Order: Coleoptera
- Suborder: Adephaga
- Family: Carabidae
- Subfamily: Lebiinae
- Tribe: Lebiini
- Subtribe: Cymindidina
- Genus: Cymindis; Latreille, 1806

= Cymindis =

Genus of beetles

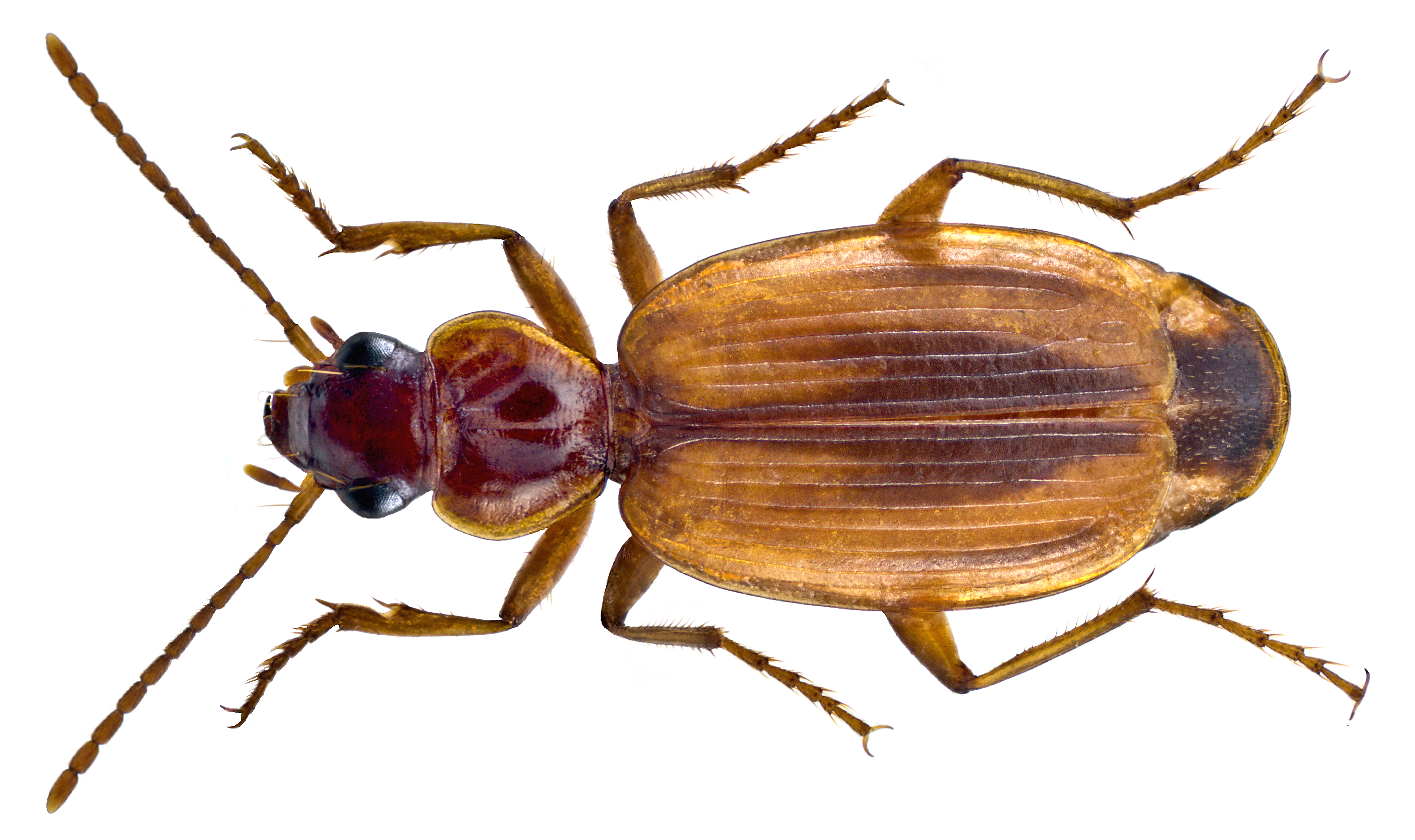
Cymindis moralesi

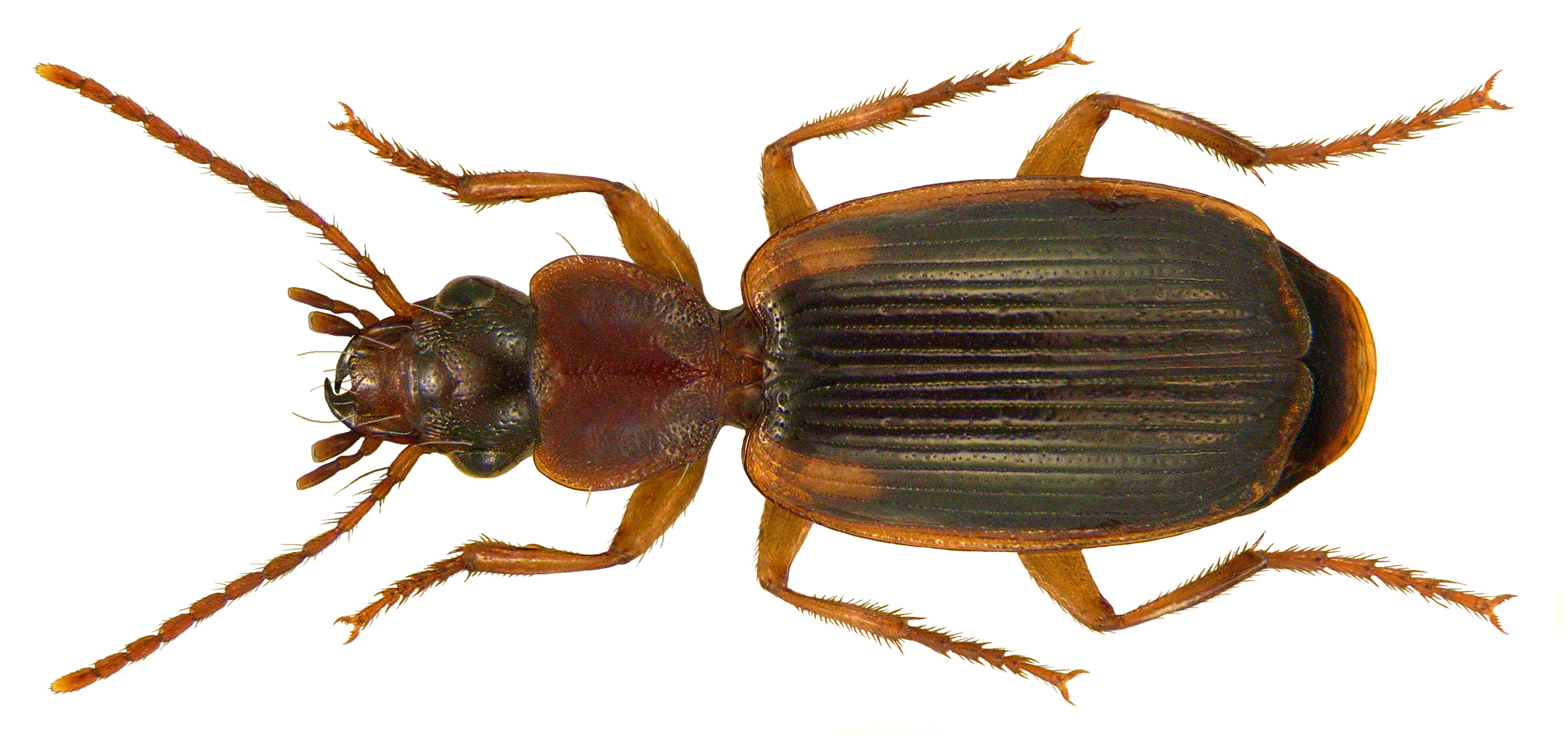
Cymindis axillaris

Cymindis is a genus of ground beetle native to the Palearctic (including Europe), the Near East, and North Africa. It contains the following species:

Subgenus Arrhostus Motschulsky, 1864
Cymindis accentifera Zoubkoff, 1833
Cymindis andreae Ménétriés, 1832
Cymindis decora Fischer von Waldheim, 1829
Cymindis facchinii Kabak, 2006
Cymindis glabrella Bates, 1878
Cymindis klapperichi Jedlicka, 1956
Cymindis nobilis Andrewes, 1933
Cymindis picta (Pallas, 1771)
Cymindis quadrisignata Ménétriés, 1848
Subgenus Baicalotarus Emetz, 1974
Cymindis collaris (Motschulsky, 1844)
Cymindis rivularis (Motschulsky, 1844)
Subgenus Chaetotarus Reitter, 1923
Cymindis dshungarica Jedlicka, 1967
Cymindis pilosissima Reitter, 1894
Subgenus Cymindis Latreille, 1805

Cymindis abeillei Jeannel, 1942
Cymindis adusta L.Redtenbacher, 1843
Cymindis alluaudi Antoine, 1939
Cymindis alternans Rambur, 1837
Cymindis alutacea (Wollaston, 1867)
Cymindis anchomenoides (Wollaston, 1867)
Cymindis angularis Gyllenhal, 1810
Cymindis aradensis Kirschenhofer, 1984
Cymindis avenae J.Sahlberg, 1908
Cymindis axillaris (Fabricius, 1794)
Cymindis babaulti Andrewes, 1924
Cymindis budensis Csiki, 1908
Cymindis bushirica Jedlicka, 1946
Cymindis carnica G.Müller, 1924
Cymindis championi Andrewes, 1928
Cymindis chodjaii Morvan, 1975
Cymindis cincta Brullé, 1839
Cymindis cingulata Dejean, 1825
Cymindis coadunata Dejean, 1825
Cymindis cobosi Mateu, 1965
Cymindis corax Reitter, 1889
Cymindis dachti Jedlicka, 1968
Cymindis davatchii Morvan, 1975
Cymindis discoidea Dejean, 1824
Cymindis discophora Chaudoir, 1873
Cymindis dohrnii (Wollaston, 1867)
Cymindis ephippium Escalera, 1914
Cymindis etrusca Bassi, 1834
Cymindis favieri Lucas, 1859
Cymindis freyi Jedlicka, 1964
Cymindis gottelandi Paulian & Villiers, 1939
Cymindis heydeni Paulino d'Oliveira, 1882
Cymindis hiekei Jedlicka, 1969
Cymindis hingstoni Andrewes, 1930
Cymindis hookeri Bates, 1875
Cymindis humeralis (Geoffroy in Fourcroy, 1785)
Cymindis imitatrix Apfelbeck, 1904
Cymindis intermedia Chaudoir, 1873
Cymindis kalavrytana Reitter, 1884
Cymindis kocheri Antoine, 1939
Cymindis kuznetzowi Sundukov, 2001
Cymindis larisae Sundukov, 1999
Cymindis leachi Reiche, 1868
Cymindis lindbergi Mateu, 1956
Cymindis lineata (Quensel, 1806)
Cymindis lineola L.Dufour, 1820
Cymindis longstaffi Andrewes, 1923
Cymindis maderae Wollaston, 1857
Cymindis marginella Brullé, 1839
Cymindis marmorae Gené, 1839
Cymindis moralesi Mateu, 1979
Cymindis naxiana Apfelbeck, 1904
Cymindis nitens Andrewes, 1935
Cymindis ornata Fischer von Waldheim, 1823
Cymindis ovipennis Motschulsky, 1844
Cymindis paivana (Wollaston, 1860)
Cymindis pallescens Jedlicka, 1963
Cymindis pellucida Piochard de la Brûlerie, 1875
Cymindis piffli Jedlicka, 1964
Cymindis pilosipennis Escalera, 1922
Cymindis pindicola Apfelbeck, 1901
Cymindis portugalica Jedlicka, 1946
Cymindis povolnyi Jedlicka, 1967
Cymindis psammodes Andrewes, 1932
Cymindis quadrimaculata Kollar & L.Redtenbacher, 1844
Cymindis rhatica Antoine, 1936
Cymindis rubriceps Andrewes, 1934
Cymindis scapularis Schaum, 1857
Cymindis setifeensis Lucas, 1842
Cymindis singularis Rosenhauer, 1856
Cymindis suturalis Dejean, 1825
Cymindis vagemaculata Breit, 1914

Subgenus Eremocymindis Emetz, 1974
Cymindis arnoldii Kabak, 1999
Cymindis cordicollis Jakovlev, 1887
Cymindis dubia Ballion, 1878
Cymindis emetzii Mikhailov, 1977
Cymindis oxiana Kabak, 1997
Cymindis pallidula Chaudoir, 1846
Subgenus Falcocymindis Sundukov, 2011
Cymindis ogloblini Kabak, 1999
Subgenus Iscariotes Reiche & Saulcy, 1855
Cymindis balchashica Emetz & Kryzhanovskij, 1973
Cymindis capito Kryzhanovskij & Emetz, 1973
Cymindis hierichontica (Reiche & Saulcy, 1855)
Cymindis hyaloptera Semenov, 1891
Cymindis jakowlewi Semenov, 1889
Cymindis kiritshenkoi Emetz & Kryzhanovskij, 1973
Cymindis sabulosa (Motschulsky, 1850)
Cymindis semenowi Jakovlev, 1890
Cymindis triangularis Reitter, 1897
Cymindis uyguricus B.Gueorguiev, 2000
Subgenus Menas Motschulsky, 1864
Cymindis bedeli Tschitscherine, 1897
Cymindis cylindrica Motschulsky, 1844
Cymindis dostojewskii Tschitscherine, 1896
Cymindis impressa Reitter, 1893
Cymindis miliaris (Fabricius, 1801)
Cymindis violacea Chaudoir, 1873
Cymindis walteri Reitter, 1889
Subgenus Neomenas Emetz, 1974
Cymindis antonowi Semenov, 1891
Subgenus Neopsammoxenus Emetz, 1973
Cymindis kasakh Kryzhanovskij & Emetz, 1973
Subgenus Orientoberus Sundokov, 2011
Cymindis daimio Bates, 1873
Cymindis faldermanni Gistel, 1840
Subgenus Paracymindis Jedlicka, 1968

Cymindis afgana Jedlicka, 1956
Cymindis akserai Jedlicka, 1961
Cymindis altaica Gebler, 1833
Cymindis angustior Kraatz, 1884
Cymindis arcana Emetz, 1972
Cymindis arnostiana Kabak in Löbl & Smetana, 2003
Cymindis asiabadensis Jedlicka, 1961
Cymindis circapicalis Kabak, 2006
Cymindis darvazica Kabak, 1999
Cymindis fedtschenkoi Tschitscherine, 1896
Cymindis ghazniensis Jedlicka, 1967
Cymindis ghaznii Jedlicka, 1968
Cymindis glebaina Kabak, 2006
Cymindis gurjevae Kabak, 1999
Cymindis kaikanica Kabak, 1999
Cymindis mannerheimi Gebler, 1843
Cymindis massageta Emetz, 1972
Cymindis michailovi Emetz, 1972
Cymindis minuta Kabak & Wrase, 1997
Cymindis olegiana Kabak, 1999
Cymindis oschanini Tschitscherine, 1896
Cymindis ovtchinnikovi Kabak, 1999
Cymindis pecirkai Jedlicka, 1946
Cymindis reitteri Liebke, 1927
Cymindis rostowtzowi Tschitscherine, 1896
Cymindis rufescens Gebler, 1845
Cymindis rufipes Gebler, 1825
Cymindis simplex Zoubkoff, 1833
Cymindis solskii Tschitscherine, 1896
Cymindis tabargataica Kabak, 1999
Cymindis tshatkalica Kabak, 1999
Cymindis vassili B.Gueorguiev, 2001

Subgenus Petrovitziella Mandl, 1973
Cymindis persica Jedlicka, 1968
Cymindis sewertzowi Tschitscherine, 1896
Cymindis vartianorum Mandl, 1973
Subgenus Pseudomastinus Bousquet, 2002
Cymindis ruficollis Gebler, 1845
Subgenus Tarsostinus Motschulsky, 1864
Cymindis arctica Kryzhanovskij & Emetz, 1979
Cymindis binotata Fischer von Waldheim, 1820
Cymindis equestris Gebler, 1825
Cymindis lateralis Fischer von Waldheim, 1820
Cymindis liangi Sundukov, 2002
Cymindis macularis Fischer von Waldheim, 1824
Cymindis medvedevi Kryzhanovskij & Emetz, 1973
Subgenus Tarulus Bedel, 1906

Cymindis americana Dejean, 1826
Cymindis amicta (Wollaston, 1864)
Cymindis arizonensis Schaeffer, 1910
Cymindis borealis LeConte, 1863
Cymindis californica G.Horn, 1895
Cymindis cribricollis Dejean, 1831
Cymindis distercicus Ortuño & Arribas, 2018
Cymindis ehlersi Putzeys, 1872
Cymindis elegans LeConte, 1846
Cymindis evanescens Casey, 1913
Cymindis interior Lindroth, 1969
Cymindis laferi Sundukov, 1999
Cymindis laticollis Say, 1830
Cymindis lelievrei Jeanne, 1985
Cymindis neglecta Haldeman, 1843
Cymindis pilosa Say, 1823
Cymindis planipennis LeConte, 1863
Cymindis seriata Hatch, 1953
Cymindis simillima (Wollaston, 1865)
Cymindis unicolor Kirby, 1837
Cymindis uniseriata Bates, 1884
Cymindis vaporariorum (Linnaeus, 1758)
Cymindis velata (Wollaston, 1865)
Cymindis zargoides (Wollaston, 1863)

Not assigned to subgenus
Cymindis caudangula Kabak, 1997
Cymindis kozlovi Kabak, 1999
Cymindis nikolajevi Kabak, 1997
Cymindis sciakyi Kabak, 2006
Cymindis tschikatunovi Mikhailov, 1977
Cymindis wrasei Kabak, 2006
†Cymindis aurora G.Horn, 1876
†Cymindis extorpescens Scudder, 1898
