= Cymindis cordicollis =

Scientific classification
- Domain: Eukaryota
- Kingdom: Animalia
- Phylum: Arthropoda
- Class: Insecta
- Order: Coleoptera
- Suborder: Adephaga
- Family: Carabidae
- Genus: Cymindis
- Species: C. cordicollis

Binomial name
- Cymindis cordicollis V. E. Jakolev, 1887

Species of beetle

Cymindis cordicollis is a species of ground beetle in the subfamily Harpalinae. It was described by V. E. Jakolev in 1887.
