= Cymindis bushirica =

Scientific classification
- Domain: Eukaryota
- Kingdom: Animalia
- Phylum: Arthropoda
- Class: Insecta
- Order: Coleoptera
- Suborder: Adephaga
- Family: Carabidae
- Genus: Cymindis
- Species: C. bushirica

Binomial name
- Cymindis bushirica Jedlicka, 1948

Species of beetle

Cymindis bushirica is a species of ground beetle in the subfamily Harpalinae. It was described by Jedlicka in 1948.
