= Cymindis emetzii =

Scientific classification
- Domain: Eukaryota
- Kingdom: Animalia
- Phylum: Arthropoda
- Class: Insecta
- Order: Coleoptera
- Suborder: Adephaga
- Family: Carabidae
- Subfamily: Lebiinae
- Tribe: Lebiini
- Subtribe: Cymindidina
- Genus: Cymindis
- Species: C. emetzii

Binomial name
- Cymindis emetzii Mikhailov, 1977

Species of beetle

Cymindis emetzii is a species in the beetle family Carabidae. It is found in Tadzhikistan.
