= Cymindis pecirkai =

Scientific classification
- Domain: Eukaryota
- Kingdom: Animalia
- Phylum: Arthropoda
- Class: Insecta
- Order: Coleoptera
- Suborder: Adephaga
- Family: Carabidae
- Genus: Cymindis
- Species: C. pecirkai

Binomial name
- Cymindis pecirkai Jedlicka, 1946

Species of beetle

Cymindis pecirkai is a species of ground beetle in the subfamily Harpalinae. It was described by Jedlicka in 1946. It is found in Kazakhstan.
