= Cymindis pallescens =

Scientific classification
- Domain: Eukaryota
- Kingdom: Animalia
- Phylum: Arthropoda
- Class: Insecta
- Order: Coleoptera
- Suborder: Adephaga
- Family: Carabidae
- Genus: Cymindis
- Species: C. pallescens

Binomial name
- Cymindis pallescens Jedlicka, 1963

Species of beetle

Cymindis pallescens is a species of ground beetle in the subfamily Harpalinae. It was described by Jedlicka in 1963.
