= Cymindis kalavrytana =

Scientific classification
- Kingdom: Animalia
- Phylum: Arthropoda
- Class: Insecta
- Order: Coleoptera
- Suborder: Adephaga
- Family: Carabidae
- Genus: Cymindis
- Species: C. kalavrytana

Binomial name
- Cymindis kalavrytana Reitter, 1884

Synonyms
- Cymindis purkynei

Species of beetle

Cymindis kalavrytana is a species of ground beetle in the subfamily Harpalinae. It was described by Reitter in 1884.
