= Cymindis tschikatunovi =

Scientific classification
- Domain: Eukaryota
- Kingdom: Animalia
- Phylum: Arthropoda
- Class: Insecta
- Order: Coleoptera
- Suborder: Adephaga
- Family: Carabidae
- Genus: Cymindis
- Species: C. tschikatunovi

Binomial name
- Cymindis tschikatunovi Mikhailov, 1977

Species of beetle

Cymindis tschikatunovi is a species of ground beetle in the subfamily Harpalinae. It is commonly found in the UK. It was described by Mikhailov in 1977.
