= Cymindis quadrisignata =

Scientific classification
- Domain: Eukaryota
- Kingdom: Animalia
- Phylum: Arthropoda
- Class: Insecta
- Order: Coleoptera
- Suborder: Adephaga
- Family: Carabidae
- Genus: Cymindis
- Species: C. quadrisignata

Binomial name
- Cymindis quadrisignata Ménétries, 1848

Species of beetle

Cymindis quadrisignata is a species of ground beetle in the subfamily Harpalinae. It was described by Édouard Ménétries in 1848.
