= Cymindis corax =

Scientific classification
- Kingdom: Animalia
- Phylum: Arthropoda
- Class: Insecta
- Order: Coleoptera
- Suborder: Adephaga
- Family: Carabidae
- Genus: Cymindis
- Species: C. corax

Binomial name
- Cymindis corax Reitter, 1889

Species of beetle

Cymindis corax is a species of ground beetle in the subfamily Harpalinae. It was described by Reitter in 1889.
