= Cymindis alternans =

Scientific classification
- Kingdom: Animalia
- Phylum: Arthropoda
- Class: Insecta
- Order: Coleoptera
- Suborder: Adephaga
- Family: Carabidae
- Genus: Cymindis
- Species: C. alternans

Binomial name
- Cymindis alternans Rambur, 1837

Species of ground beetle

Cymindis alternans is a species of ground beetle in the subfamily Harpalinae. It was described by Rambur in 1837.
