= Cymindis ghazniensis =

Scientific classification
- Domain: Eukaryota
- Kingdom: Animalia
- Phylum: Arthropoda
- Class: Insecta
- Order: Coleoptera
- Suborder: Adephaga
- Family: Carabidae
- Genus: Cymindis
- Species: C. ghazniensis

Binomial name
- Cymindis ghazniensis Jedlicka, 1967

Species of beetle

Cymindis ghazniensis is a species of ground beetle in the subfamily Harpalinae. It was described by Jedlicka in 1967.
