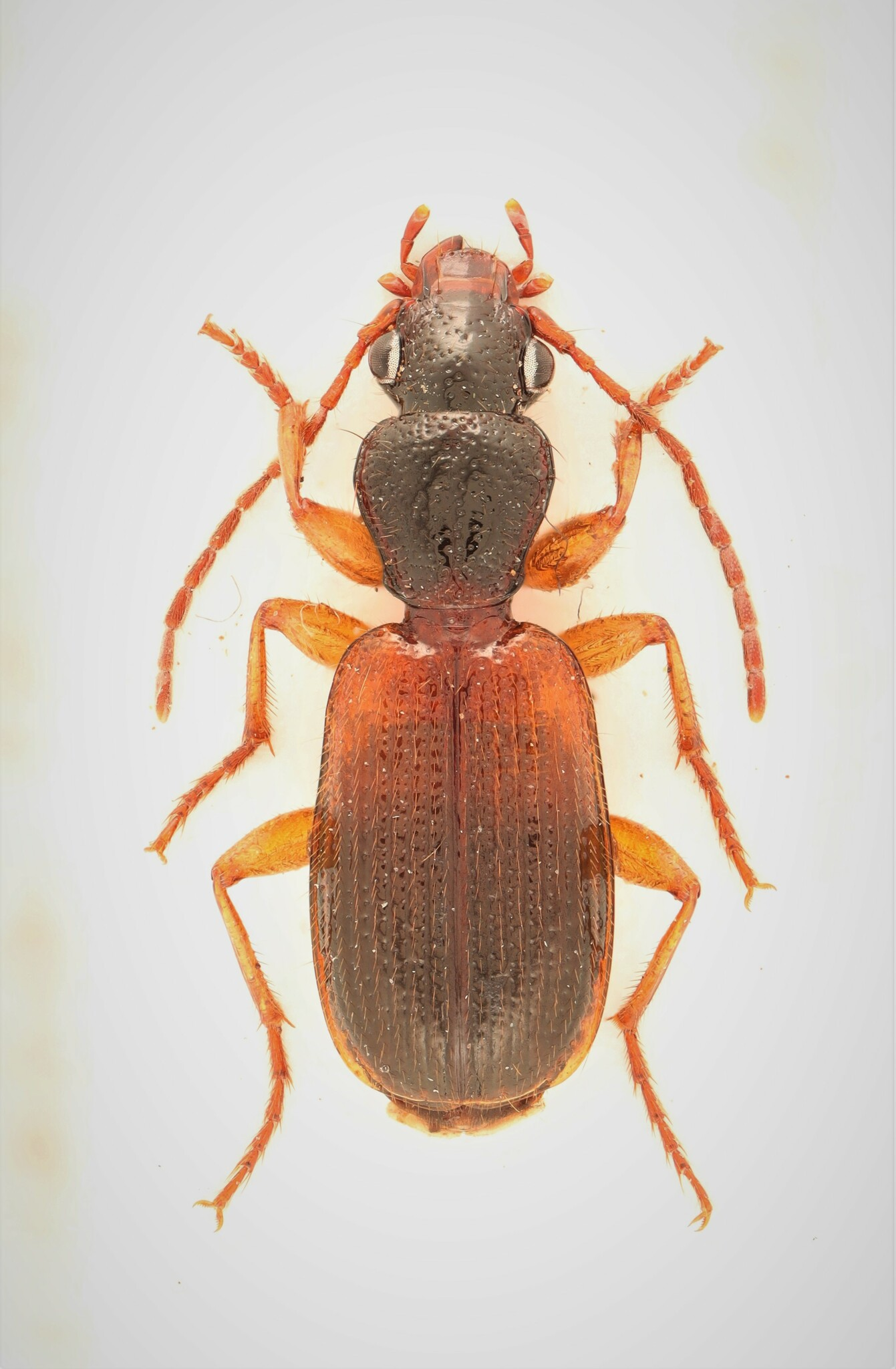

Scientific classification
- Kingdom: Animalia
- Phylum: Arthropoda
- Class: Insecta
- Order: Coleoptera
- Suborder: Adephaga
- Family: Carabidae
- Genus: Cymindis
- Species: C. neglecta

Binomial name
- Cymindis neglecta Haldeman, 1843

= Cymindis neglecta =

Species of beetle

Cymindis neglecta is a species of ground beetle in the subfamily Harpalinae. It was described by Haldeman in 1843.
