= Cymindis pallidula =

Scientific classification
- Kingdom: Animalia
- Phylum: Arthropoda
- Class: Insecta
- Order: Coleoptera
- Suborder: Adephaga
- Family: Carabidae
- Genus: Cymindis
- Species: C. pallidula

Binomial name
- Cymindis pallidula Chaudoir, 1846

Species of beetle

Cymindis pallidula is a species of ground beetle in the subfamily Harpalinae. It was described by Chaudoir in 1846.
