= Cymindis vartianorum =

Scientific classification
- Kingdom: Animalia
- Phylum: Arthropoda
- Clade: Pancrustacea
- Class: Insecta
- Order: Coleoptera
- Suborder: Adephaga
- Family: Carabidae
- Genus: Cymindis
- Species: C. vartianorum

Binomial name
- Cymindis vartianorum Mandl, 1973

Species of beetle

Cymindis vartianorum is a species of ground beetle in the subfamily Harpalinae. It was described by Mandl in 1973.
