= Cymindis hookeri =

Scientific classification
- Domain: Eukaryota
- Kingdom: Animalia
- Phylum: Arthropoda
- Class: Insecta
- Order: Coleoptera
- Suborder: Adephaga
- Family: Carabidae
- Genus: Cymindis
- Species: C. hookeri

Binomial name
- Cymindis hookeri Bates, 1875

Species of beetle

Cymindis hookeri is a species of ground beetle in the subfamily Harpalinae. It was described by Henry Walter Bates in 1875.
