= Cymindis californica =

Scientific classification
- Domain: Eukaryota
- Kingdom: Animalia
- Phylum: Arthropoda
- Class: Insecta
- Order: Coleoptera
- Suborder: Adephaga
- Family: Carabidae
- Genus: Cymindis
- Species: C. californica

Binomial name
- Cymindis californica G. Horn, 1895

Species of beetle

Cymindis californica is a species of ground beetle in the subfamily Harpalinae. It was described by G. Horn in 1895.
