= Cymindis andreae =

Scientific classification
- Domain: Eukaryota
- Kingdom: Animalia
- Phylum: Arthropoda
- Class: Insecta
- Order: Coleoptera
- Suborder: Adephaga
- Family: Carabidae
- Genus: Cymindis
- Species: C. andreae

Binomial name
- Cymindis andreae Ménétries, 1832

Species of ground beetle

Cymindis andreae is a species of ground beetle in the subfamily Harpalinae. It was described by Édouard Ménétries in 1832.
