= Cymindis seriata =

Scientific classification
- Domain: Eukaryota
- Kingdom: Animalia
- Phylum: Arthropoda
- Class: Insecta
- Order: Coleoptera
- Suborder: Adephaga
- Family: Carabidae
- Genus: Cymindis
- Species: C. seriata

Binomial name
- Cymindis seriata Hatch, 1953

Species of beetle

Cymindis seriata is a species of ground beetle in the subfamily Harpalinae. It was described by Hatch in 1953.
