= Cymindis ehlersi =

Scientific classification
- Domain: Eukaryota
- Kingdom: Animalia
- Phylum: Arthropoda
- Class: Insecta
- Order: Coleoptera
- Suborder: Adephaga
- Family: Carabidae
- Genus: Cymindis
- Species: C. ehlersi

Binomial name
- Cymindis ehlersi Putzeys, 1872

Species of beetle

Cymindis ehlersi is a species of ground beetle in the subfamily Harpalinae. It was described by Jules Putzeys in 1872.
