= Cymindis vaporariorum =

Scientific classification
- Kingdom: Animalia
- Phylum: Arthropoda
- Class: Insecta
- Order: Coleoptera
- Suborder: Adephaga
- Family: Carabidae
- Genus: Cymindis
- Species: C. vaporariorum

Binomial name
- Cymindis vaporariorum (Linnaeus, 1758)

Species of beetle

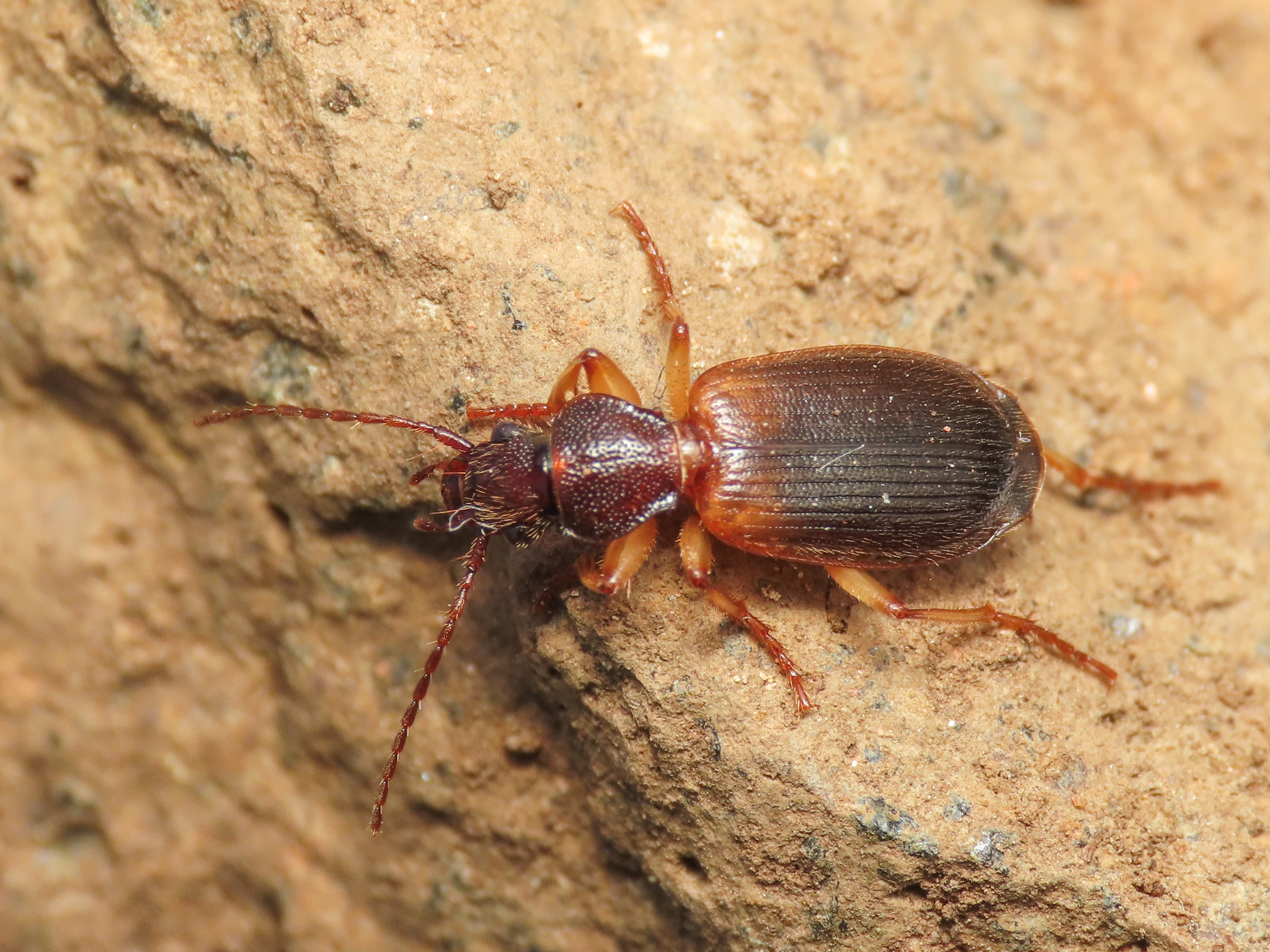
Cymindis vaporariorum

Cymindis vaporariorum is a species of ground beetle in the subfamily Harpalinae. It was described by Carl Linnaeus in 1758. Most adults are collected in June and July, but likely are around all summer.
