= Cymindis akserai =

Scientific classification
- Domain: Eukaryota
- Kingdom: Animalia
- Phylum: Arthropoda
- Class: Insecta
- Order: Coleoptera
- Suborder: Adephaga
- Family: Carabidae
- Genus: Cymindis
- Species: C. akserai

Binomial name
- Cymindis akserai Jedlicka, 1961

Species of ground beetle

Cymindis akserai is a species of ground beetle in the subfamily Harpalinae. It was described by Jedlicka in 1961.
