= Cymindis violacea =

Scientific classification
- Domain: Eukaryota
- Kingdom: Animalia
- Phylum: Arthropoda
- Class: Insecta
- Order: Coleoptera
- Suborder: Adephaga
- Family: Carabidae
- Genus: Cymindis
- Species: C. violacea

Binomial name
- Cymindis violacea Chaudoir, 1873

Species of beetle

Cymindis violacea is a species of ground beetle in the subfamily Harpalinae. It was described by Maximilien Chaudoir in 1873.
