= Cymindis hierichontica =

Scientific classification
- Domain: Eukaryota
- Kingdom: Animalia
- Phylum: Arthropoda
- Class: Insecta
- Order: Coleoptera
- Suborder: Adephaga
- Family: Carabidae
- Genus: Cymindis
- Species: C. hierichontica

Binomial name
- Cymindis hierichontica Reiche & Saulcy, 1855

Species of beetle

Cymindis hierichontica is a species of ground beetle in the subfamily Harpalinae. It was described by Reiche & Saulcy in 1855.
