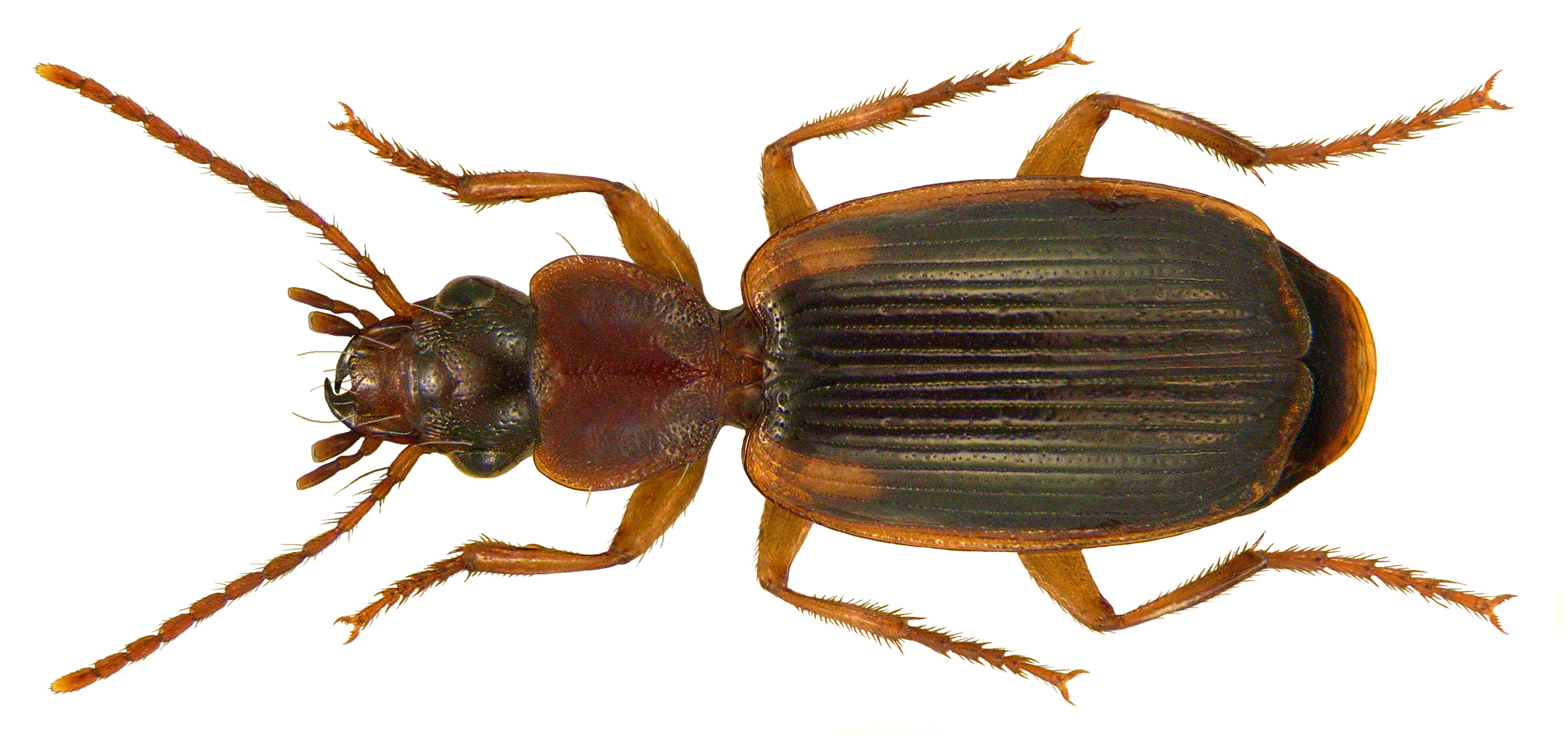

Scientific classification
- Kingdom: Animalia
- Phylum: Arthropoda
- Clade: Pancrustacea
- Class: Insecta
- Order: Coleoptera
- Suborder: Adephaga
- Family: Carabidae
- Genus: Cymindis
- Species: C. axillaris

Binomial name
- Cymindis axillaris (Fabricius, 1794)

= Cymindis axillaris =

Species of ground beetle

Cymindis axillaris is a species of ground beetle in the subfamily Harpalinae. It was described by Johan Christian Fabricius in 1794.
