= Cymindis heydeni =

Scientific classification
- Domain: Eukaryota
- Kingdom: Animalia
- Phylum: Arthropoda
- Class: Insecta
- Order: Coleoptera
- Suborder: Adephaga
- Family: Carabidae
- Genus: Cymindis
- Species: C. heydeni

Binomial name
- Cymindis heydeni Paulino De Oliveira, 1882

Species of beetle

Cymindis heydeni is a species of ground beetle in the subfamily Harpalinae. It was described by Paulino De Oliveira in 1882.
