= Cymindis piffli =

Scientific classification
- Domain: Eukaryota
- Kingdom: Animalia
- Phylum: Arthropoda
- Class: Insecta
- Order: Coleoptera
- Suborder: Adephaga
- Family: Carabidae
- Genus: Cymindis
- Species: C. piffli

Binomial name
- Cymindis piffli Jedlicka, 1964

Species of beetle

Cymindis piffli is a species of ground beetle in the subfamily Harpalinae. It was described by Jedlicka in 1964. It was a part of harvest of the Austrian Karakoram expedition.
