= Cymindis macularis =

Scientific classification
- Kingdom: Animalia
- Phylum: Arthropoda
- Clade: Pancrustacea
- Class: Insecta
- Order: Coleoptera
- Suborder: Adephaga
- Family: Carabidae
- Genus: Cymindis
- Species: C. macularis

Binomial name
- Cymindis macularis Fischer Von Waldheim, 1824

Species of beetle

Cymindis macularis

Cymindis macularis is a species of ground beetle in the subfamily Harpalinae. It was described by Fischer Von Waldheim in 1824.
