= Cymindis cylindrica =

Scientific classification
- Kingdom: Animalia
- Phylum: Arthropoda
- Class: Insecta
- Order: Coleoptera
- Suborder: Adephaga
- Family: Carabidae
- Genus: Cymindis
- Species: C. cylindrica

Binomial name
- Cymindis cylindrica Motschulsky, 1844

Species of beetle

Cymindis cylindrica is a species of ground beetle in the subfamily Harpalinae. It was described by Victor Motschulsky in 1844.
