= Cymindis pilosa =

Scientific classification
- Domain: Eukaryota
- Kingdom: Animalia
- Phylum: Arthropoda
- Class: Insecta
- Order: Coleoptera
- Suborder: Adephaga
- Family: Carabidae
- Genus: Cymindis
- Species: C. pilosa

Binomial name
- Cymindis pilosa Say, 1823

Species of beetle

Cymindis pilosa is a species of ground beetle in the subfamily Harpalinae. It was described by Say in 1823.
