= Cymindis setifeensis =

Scientific classification
- Domain: Eukaryota
- Kingdom: Animalia
- Phylum: Arthropoda
- Class: Insecta
- Order: Coleoptera
- Suborder: Adephaga
- Family: Carabidae
- Genus: Cymindis
- Species: C. setifeensis

Binomial name
- Cymindis setifeensis H. Lucas, 1842

Species of beetle

Cymindis setifeensis is a species of ground beetle in the subfamily Harpalinae. It was described by Hippolyte Lucas in 1842.
