= Cymindis balchashica =

Scientific classification
- Domain: Eukaryota
- Kingdom: Animalia
- Phylum: Arthropoda
- Class: Insecta
- Order: Coleoptera
- Suborder: Adephaga
- Family: Carabidae
- Genus: Cymindis
- Species: C. balchashica

Binomial name
- Cymindis balchashica Emetz & Kryzhanovskij, 1973

Species of beetle

Cymindis balchashica is a species of ground beetle in the subfamily Harpalinae. It was described by Emetz & Kryzhanovskij in 1973.
