= Cymindis davatchii =

Scientific classification
- Domain: Eukaryota
- Kingdom: Animalia
- Phylum: Arthropoda
- Class: Insecta
- Order: Coleoptera
- Suborder: Adephaga
- Family: Carabidae
- Genus: Cymindis
- Species: C. davatchii

Binomial name
- Cymindis davatchii Morvan, 1975

Species of beetle

Cymindis davatchii is a species of ground beetle in the subfamily Harpalinae which was described by Morvan in 1975.
