= Cymindis rhatica =

Scientific classification
- Domain: Eukaryota
- Kingdom: Animalia
- Phylum: Arthropoda
- Class: Insecta
- Order: Coleoptera
- Suborder: Adephaga
- Family: Carabidae
- Genus: Cymindis
- Species: C. rhatica

Binomial name
- Cymindis rhatica Antoine, 1936

Species of beetle

Cymindis rhatica is a species of ground beetle in the subfamily Harpalinae. It was described by Antoine in 1936.
