= Cymindis antonowi =

Scientific classification
- Domain: Eukaryota
- Kingdom: Animalia
- Phylum: Arthropoda
- Class: Insecta
- Order: Coleoptera
- Suborder: Adephaga
- Family: Carabidae
- Genus: Cymindis
- Species: C. antonowi

Binomial name
- Cymindis antonowi Semenov, 1891

Species of ground beetle

Cymindis antonowi is a species of ground beetle in the subfamily Harpalinae. It was described by Semenov in 1891.
