= Cymindis tabargataica =

Scientific classification
- Domain: Eukaryota
- Kingdom: Animalia
- Phylum: Arthropoda
- Class: Insecta
- Order: Coleoptera
- Suborder: Adephaga
- Family: Carabidae
- Subfamily: Lebiinae
- Tribe: Lebiini
- Subtribe: Cymindidina
- Genus: Cymindis
- Species: C. tabargataica

Binomial name
- Cymindis tabargataica Kabak, 1999

Synonyms
- Cymindis tarbagataica

Species of beetle

Cymindis tabargataica is a species in the beetle family Carabidae. It is found in Kazakhstan.
