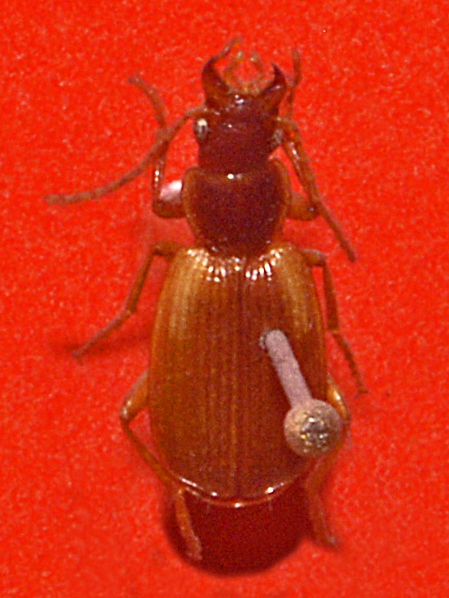
- Cymindis humeralis . Museum specimen

Scientific classification
- Kingdom: Animalia
- Phylum: Arthropoda
- Clade: Pancrustacea
- Class: Insecta
- Order: Coleoptera
- Suborder: Adephaga
- Family: Carabidae
- Genus: Cymindis
- Species: C. humeralis

Binomial name
- Cymindis humeralis (Geoffroy, 1785)

= Cymindis humeralis =

Species of beetle

Cymindis humeralis is a species of ground beetle in the subfamily Harpalinae. It was described by Geoffory in 1785.

== Description ==
Cymindis humeralis can reach a length of 7.5–10.5 millimetres (0.30–0.41 in).

== Distribution ==
This species is present in most of Europe (Austria, Belarus, Bosnia and Herzegovina, Bulgaria, Czech Republic, Denmark, Estonia, France, Germany, Hungary, Italy, Latvia, Macedonia, Netherlands, Poland, Portugal, Romania, Russia, Slovakia, Spain, Ukraine) and in the East Palearctic ecozone.

== Habitat ==
This xerophilous ground beetle lives in calcareous grasslands, heathlands and in the edges of forests.

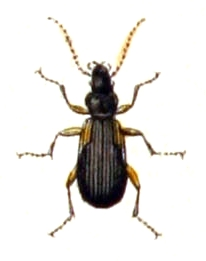
Illustration from Calwer's Käferbuch
