= Cymindis glabrella =

Scientific classification
- Domain: Eukaryota
- Kingdom: Animalia
- Phylum: Arthropoda
- Class: Insecta
- Order: Coleoptera
- Suborder: Adephaga
- Family: Carabidae
- Genus: Cymindis
- Species: C. glabrella

Binomial name
- Cymindis glabrella Bates, 1878

Species of beetle

Cymindis glabrella is a species of ground beetle in the subfamily Harpalinae. It was described by Henry Walter Bates in 1878.
