= Cymindis pellucida =

Scientific classification
- Domain: Eukaryota
- Kingdom: Animalia
- Phylum: Arthropoda
- Class: Insecta
- Order: Coleoptera
- Suborder: Adephaga
- Family: Carabidae
- Genus: Cymindis
- Species: C. pellucida

Binomial name
- Cymindis pellucida Piochard De La Brulerie, 1875

Species of beetle

Cymindis pellucida is a species of ground beetle in the subfamily Harpalinae. It was described by Piochard De La Brulerie in 1875.
