= Cymindis laferi =

Scientific classification
- Kingdom: Animalia
- Phylum: Arthropoda
- Class: Insecta
- Order: Coleoptera
- Suborder: Adephaga
- Family: Carabidae
- Genus: Cymindis
- Species: C. laferi

Binomial name
- Cymindis laferi Sundukov, 1999

Species of beetle

Cymindis laferi is a species of ground beetle in the subfamily Harpalinae. It was described by Sundukov in 1999, who observed the beetle in the forest zone of Primorsky Krai (the southernmost Krai in eastern Russia).
