= Cymindis simillima =

Scientific classification
- Domain: Eukaryota
- Kingdom: Animalia
- Phylum: Arthropoda
- Class: Insecta
- Order: Coleoptera
- Suborder: Adephaga
- Family: Carabidae
- Genus: Cymindis
- Species: C. simillima

Binomial name
- Cymindis simillima Wollaston, 1865

Species of beetle

Cymindis simillima is a species of ground beetle in the subfamily Harpalinae. It was described by Thomas Vernon Wollaston in 1865.
