= Cymindis sewertzowi =

Scientific classification
- Domain: Eukaryota
- Kingdom: Animalia
- Phylum: Arthropoda
- Class: Insecta
- Order: Coleoptera
- Suborder: Adephaga
- Family: Carabidae
- Genus: Cymindis
- Species: C. sewertzowi

Binomial name
- Cymindis sewertzowi Tschitscherine, 1896

Species of beetle

Cymindis sewertzowi is a species of ground beetle in the subfamily Harpalinae. It was described by Tschitscherine in 1896.
