= Cymindis fedtschenkoi =

Scientific classification
- Domain: Eukaryota
- Kingdom: Animalia
- Phylum: Arthropoda
- Class: Insecta
- Order: Coleoptera
- Suborder: Adephaga
- Family: Carabidae
- Genus: Cymindis
- Species: C. fedtschenkoi

Binomial name
- Cymindis fedtschenkoi Tschitscherine, 1896

Species of beetle

Cymindis fedtschenkoi is a type of ground beetle in the subfamily Harpalinae. It was described by Tschitscherine in 1896.
