= Cymindis miliaris =

Scientific classification
- Domain: Eukaryota
- Kingdom: Animalia
- Phylum: Arthropoda
- Class: Insecta
- Order: Coleoptera
- Suborder: Adephaga
- Family: Carabidae
- Genus: Cymindis
- Species: C. miliaris

Binomial name
- Cymindis miliaris (Fabricius, 1801)

Species of beetle

Cymindis miliaris is a species of ground beetle in the subfamily Harpalinae. It was described by Johan Christian Fabricius in 1801.
