= Cymindis semenowi =

Scientific classification
- Domain: Eukaryota
- Kingdom: Animalia
- Phylum: Arthropoda
- Class: Insecta
- Order: Coleoptera
- Suborder: Adephaga
- Family: Carabidae
- Genus: Cymindis
- Species: C. semenowi

Binomial name
- Cymindis semenowi V. E. Jakovlev, 1890

Species of beetle

Cymindis semenowi is a species of ground beetle in the subfamily Harpalinae. It was described by V. E. Jakovlev in 1890.
