= Cymindis amicta =

Scientific classification
- Domain: Eukaryota
- Kingdom: Animalia
- Phylum: Arthropoda
- Class: Insecta
- Order: Coleoptera
- Suborder: Adephaga
- Family: Carabidae
- Genus: Cymindis
- Species: C. amicta

Binomial name
- Cymindis amicta Wollaston, 1864

Species of ground beetle

Cymindis amicta is a species of ground beetle in the subfamily Harpalinae. It was described by Thomas Vernon Wollaston in 1864.
