= Cymindis unicolor =

Scientific classification
- Domain: Eukaryota
- Kingdom: Animalia
- Phylum: Arthropoda
- Class: Insecta
- Order: Coleoptera
- Suborder: Adephaga
- Family: Carabidae
- Genus: Cymindis
- Species: C. unicolor

Binomial name
- Cymindis unicolor Kirby, 1837

Species of beetle

Cymindis unicolor is a species of ground beetle in the subfamily Harpalinae. It was described by William Kirby in 1837.
