= Cymindis carnica =

Scientific classification
- Domain: Eukaryota
- Kingdom: Animalia
- Phylum: Arthropoda
- Class: Insecta
- Order: Coleoptera
- Suborder: Adephaga
- Family: Carabidae
- Genus: Cymindis
- Species: C. carnica

Binomial name
- Cymindis carnica J. Muller, 1924

Species of beetle

Cymindis carnica is a species of ground beetle in the subfamily Harpalinae. It was described by J. Muller in 1924.
