= Ian C. Ballon =

American legal scholar

Ian Ballon is an American Internet and intellectual property litigator, author of books on Internet law and executive director of Stanford University Law School's Center for E-Commerce. He is the author of the 4-volume legal treatise, E-Commerce and Internet Law: Treatise with Forms 2d edition, the leading legal reference book on Internet law, which was first published in 2000. A second edition was published in 2008 and is updated annually. He is also an intellectual property litigator with Greenberg Traurig LLP, a firm of approximately 1800 lawyers.

Mr. Ballon grew up in Montreal, Quebec, Canada, and has been practicing in the area of Internet law since the early-to-mid-1990s. He gave a speech on Internet law at the 1995 ABA Annual Meeting in Chicago and was talked into converting the outline he prepared for that speech into a full book by Ray Ocampo, then the general counsel of Oracle Corporation. The book was eventually published in December 2000 as a three volume set covering copyright, patent, trademark, trade secret and other intellectual property laws, licensing, litigation, privacy, security, secondary liability, jurisdiction, criminal laws and obscenity and child pornography, all from a practical, business-oriented perspective. The treatise grew to four volumes and eventually a second edition was released in 2008. The treatise has been cited as authority by state and federal courts.

Ian Ballon was first admitted to practice in 1986 (in Maryland) and is also admitted to practice in California (admitted in 1989) and the District of Columbia (in 1988). He started practicing law in the DC area and moved to California in 1989, just days before the 1989 Loma Prieta earthquake. Since 2000, he has worked out of offices in both Silicon Valley and Los Angeles, focusing in particular on technology and entertainment industry clients. His clients have included eBay, Inc., Hewlett-Packard, 20th Century Fox Film Corporation, Sony Pictures Entertainment, EMI Records, CaféPress, the McClatchy Company newspaper chain and MySpace.

As a litigator, Ballon has helped shape the development of internet law. He was recognized by the Los Angeles and San Francisco Daily Journal in 2009 for obtaining the third largest plaintiff's verdict in California in 2008 in MySpace, Inc. v. Wallace in a judgment of over $230,000,000 against "King of Spam" Sanford Wallace.

Ian Ballon was also named one of the top 100 lawyers in California in late 2008 and one of the Top 75 intellectual property litigators in California in 2009 by the Los Angeles and San Francisco Daily Journal. Mr. Ballon previously has been recognized as one of the top new media lawyers in the United States by CyberEsq. magazine, one of the 100 most influential lawyers in California by California Law Business, one of the top lawyers in L.A. by the Los Angeles Business Journal, one of the top 50 IP Litigators in California and one of the top 25 copyright, trademark and patent lawyers in California by The Daily Journal. He is listed in Legal 500 U.S., The Best Lawyers in America in the areas of intellectual property and information technology and Chambers and Partners USA Guide in the areas of privacy and data security and IT and outsourcing.

Mr. Ballon also serves as executive director of Stanford University Law School's Center for E-Commerce, which hosts an annual E-Commerce Best Practices Conference every June at the law school, as well as hosting other periodic programs of interest to Internet lawyers. He previously served as an Adviser to the American Law Institute's Intellectual Property: Principles Governing Jurisdiction, Choice of Law, and Judgments in Transactional Disputes (ALI Principles of the Law 2007). He is also a frequent speaker at Internet and intellectual property conferences and has been quoted on these topics in publications such as the New York Times and Wall Street Journal. Ballon's other books include The Complete State Law Security Breach Notification Handbook (first published in 2009) and The Complete CAN-SPAM Act Practice Guide (first published in 2008).
