= Balon (surname) =

Balon is a surname. Notable people with the name include:

- Amanda Balon (born 1997), American actress
- Claude Balon (1671–1744), French dancer and choreographer
- Dave Balon (1938–2007), Canadian ice hockey player and coach
- Eugene K. Balon (1930–2013), Polish Canadian and Czech zoologist and ichthyologist
- Halina Balon (born 1948), Polish fencer
- Norman Balon (1927–2026), British pub landlord
- Vladimir Balon (1937–2013), Soviet and Russian actor and fencer

== See also ==
- Ballon (surname)
