= Pieter Ballon =

Belgian scientist

Pieter Ballon is a Belgian historian and communications scholar specializing in smart cities. He is a Professor in Communication Sciences at Vrije Universiteit Brussel (VUB) and holder of the university's academic Chair on Smart Cities.

== Career ==
Ballon is the director of SMIT (Studies in Media, Innovation and Technologies), a research group that is affiliated with VUB and IMEC, and the scientific director of the Knowledge Centre Data & Society. He is also the co-founder of the international Open & Agile Smart Cities (OASC) network and of the European Network of Living Labs (ENoLL).

Ballon was general coordinator of the Smart Flanders programme and was named the first ‘Smart City Ambassador’ for the Brussels Capital Region.

== Books ==
Ballon is the author of:

- De stad is een boek: Over slimme steden, technologie en literatuur [The city is a book: On smart cities, technology and literature] (Lannoo, 2019)
- Smart cities: Hoe technologie onze steden leefbaar houdt en slimmer maakt [How technology keeps our cities liveable and makes them smarter] (Lannoo, 2016)
