= Ernst von Ballion =

Russian entomologist (1816–1901)

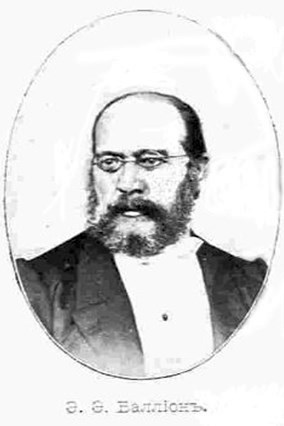
Ernst von Ballion

Ernst Ernestovich Ballion (also known as Ernst von Ballion; Russian: Эрнест Эрнестович Баллион; 18 December 1816 in Novorossisk – 9 September 1901 in Novorossisk) was a Russian entomologist who specialised in Coleoptera, especially Tenebrionidae.

== Works ==
Partial list

- Eine centurie neuer Käfer aus der Fauna der russischen Reiches Bull. Soc. Imp. Nat. Mosc. 43,. 320–353 (1870).
- Verzeichniss der im Kreise von Kuldsha gesammelten Käfer, Bull. Soc. Nat. Mosc. 53 (2), 253–289 (1878).

== Collections ==
His collections are conserved in the Zoological Museum of Odessa University and in the Forest Technical Academy Saint Petersburg where his extensive collection of world Lepidoptera is also conserved.

== Sources ==
- "Баллион, Эрнест Эрнестович" . Brockhaus and Efron Encyclopedic Dictionary (in Russian). 1906.
