= Facchinetti =

Coat of arms of the Facchinetti family

Facchinetti (pronounced [fakkiˈnetti]) is an Italian surname, most notably borne by an old and prominent noble family from Bologna. The founder of the family was Antonio Facchinetti, first mentioned in the late 14th century. Members held many important ecclesiastical political positions during history of Apennine Peninsula. Most notable member was of the family was Pope Innocent IX.

Notable people with the surname include:

- Alessandra Facchinetti (born 1972), Italian fashion designer
- Cesare Facchinetti (1608–1683), Italian Catholic cardinal
- Cipriano Facchinetti (1889–1952), Italian politician and minister of defence
- Francesco Facchinetti (born 1980), Italian DJ, producer, singer, musician and TV presenter
- Gilbert Facchinetti (1936–2018), Italian-Swiss entrepreneur
- Giovanni Antonio Facchinetti (1519–1591), head of the Catholic Church and ruler of the Papal States as Pope Innocent IX
- Jean Facchinetti (1904–1965), Swiss footballer
- Mickaël Facchinetti (born 1991), Swiss footballer
- Paolo Facchinetti (born 1984), Italian footballer
- Roby Facchinetti (born 1944), Italian musician, singer and keyboardist, member of Pooh
- Simone Facchinetti (born 1972), Italian art historian
- Walter Facchinetti (born 1947), Italian boxer

== See also ==
- Facchetti
- Facchin
- Facchina
- Facchini
