= Facchini =

Facchini (pronounced [fakˈkiːni]) is an Italian surname. Notable people with the surname include:

- Adriano Facchini (disambiguation), multiple people
- Eugenio Facchini (1912–1944), Italian politician and soldier
- Francesco Angelo Facchini (1788–1852), Italian naturalist
- Maria Cristina Facchini (born 1960), Italian geoscientist
- Patrick Facchini (born 1988), Italian cyclist

== See also ==
- Namesakes of F. A. Facchini:
  - Facchinia, a genus of plants in the family Caryophyllaceae
  - Aquilegia facchinii, a species of plants in the family Ranunculaceae
  - Cymindis facchinii, a species of beetle in the subfamily Harpalinae
  - Dyschirius facchinii, a species of beetle in the subfamily Scaritinae
  - Vila Facchini Biological Reserve, São Paulo, Brazil
- Other surnames:
  - Facchetti
  - Facchin
  - Facchina
  - Facchinetti
