= Théâtre du Silence =

Dance company

Theater of the silence

General information
- Name: Theater of the silence
- Local name: Théâtre du Silence
- Year founded: 1972
- Principal venue: La Rochelle, France

Senior staff
- Director: Jacques Garnier, Brigitte Lefevre

Théâtre du Silence (Theatre of silence) was a dance company created by Jacques Garnier and Brigitte Lefèvre.

== History ==
Founded by two Paris Opera Ballet dancers, Théâtre du Silence was one of the most famous dance companies in France. Its debut took place in 1972 at Théâtre de la Ville in Paris. From 1974 to 1985 the company was located in La Rochelle.

Théâtre du Silence created many contemporary dance ballets, mostly choreographed by Jacques Garnier or Brigitte Lefévre. Choreographers such as Maurice Béjart, Merce Cunningham, David Gordon, Robert Kovitch ou Lar Lubovitch worked for the Théâtre du Silence and played an important role in spreading contemporary dance in France.

== Repertory ==
=== Jacques Garnier ===
- Suite de danses, on a Béla Bartók music, costums by Bruno Crespel;
- Pas de deux, Anton Webern music, costumes by Reynaldo Cerqueira, danced by Brigitte Lefèvre and Jacques Garnier;
- La Nuit, musics by Jean-Pierre Drouet, Diego Masson and Michel Portal, danced by Nicole Chouret, Katia Grey, Brigitte Lefevre, Catherine Morel, Annette Mulard, Françoise Vaussenat, Martine Vuillermoz, Richard Duquesnoy, Jean Guizerix, Patrick Marty, Jacques Namont, Didier Schirpaz, Georges Teplitsky, Jean-Marc Torres;
- Leda, on a Paul Éluard text danced by Brigitte Lefèvre, Daniel Gélin (narrator);
- Flashback, creation in Avignon, in August 1974, Igor Stravinsky's music, danced by Martine Clary, Mireille Conotte, Élisabeth Nicolas, Michel Bouche, Jacques Garnier, Olivier Marmin, Dragan Mocic, Catherine Morelle, Serge Bonnafoux;
- Construction, creation in Lausanne, musics by Émile de Ceuninck, danced by Martine Clary, Mireille Conotte, Catherine Morelle, Élisabeth Nicolas, Michel Bouche, Serge Bonnafoux, Olivier Marmin, Dragan Mocic;
- L'Ange, Jean-Pierre Drouet's music, claim by Saint Maur, with Gérard Frémy (musician), Jean-Pierre Drouet (musician), Michaël Denard (angel), Brigitte Lefèvre (She), Jean Guizerix (man);
- Aunis, danced in 1980 by Jacques Garnier, André Lafonta and Lari Léong.

=== Brigitte Lefèvre ===
- Mikrokosmos, Béla Bartók music, danced by Brigitte Lefèvre, Michaël Denard, Jacques Garnier;
- Un certain temps, Terry Riley's music, danced by Martine Clary, Mireille Conotte, Catherine Morelle, Élisabeth Nicolas, Michel Bouche, Jacques Garnier, Olivier Marmin, Dragan Mocic;
- Oiseau triste, Maurice Ravel's music, choreographed by Jean Guizerix;
- ''Oiseau de feu, by Michaël Denard (1980);
- SummerSpace, Merce Cunningham.

== Dancers ==
- Martine Clary
- André Lafonta
- Alexander Veal
- Lari Léong
- Jean Guizerix
- Michaël Denard
- Serge Bonnafoux
- Olivier Marmin
- Dragan Mocic
- Catherine Morelle
- Mireille Conotte
- Nicole Chouret
- Annette Mulard
- Françoise Vaussenat
- Martine Vuillermoz
- Richard Duquesnoy
- Patrick Marty
- Jacques Namont
- Didier Schirpaz
- Georges Teplitsky
- Jean-Marc Torres
- Katia Grey
- Nicole Chouret
- Josyane Consoli
- Cooky Chiapalone
- Élisabeth Nicolas
- Michel Bouche
- Stéphanie White
- Philippe Tresserra

- Nicole-Claire Perreau
