= Sachin =

Sachin may refer to:

- Sachin (given name), an Indian given name, including a list of people with the name
  - Sachin (actor) (born 1957), Indian actor and filmmaker
  - Sachin (boxer), Indian boxer
  - Sachin Tendulkar (born 1973), Indian cricketer

== Films ==
- Sachein, a 2005 Tamil film directed by John Mahendran, sometimes spelled "Sachin"
- Sachin: A Billion Dreams, a 2017 Indian biographical film of Sachin Tendulkar
- Sachin (film), a 2018 Malayalam film directed by Santhosh Nair
- Sachin: The Ultimate Winner, a 2023 Indian film based on the cricketer

== Places ==
- Sachin, Pas-de-Calais, a town in northern France
- Sachin, Gujarat, a suburban area of Surat in India
  - Sachin INA, a town and an industrial notified area
  - Sachin railway station, a small railway station in Surat district, Gujarat
- Sachin State, a princely state of India from 1791 to 1948
