= Ulysse (ballet) =

Contemporary dance work by Jean-Claude Gallotta

- Genre: Contemporary dance
- Inventor: Jean-Claude Gallotta
- Year: Written between 1976 - 1981; Presented for the first time on March 13, 1981 at the Maison de la culture de Grenoble

Ulysse is a contemporary dance work by French choreographer Jean-Claude Gallotta, created in 1981 for eight dancers. It is considered one of Gallotta's most important works, and a cornerstone of the new French dance movement of the early 1980s. Faithful to his desire to revisit his works, Jean-Claude Gallotta has re-choreographed Ulysse on numerous occasions, offering four different versions to date in terms of performers, scenography and music: Ulysse (1981), Ulysse, re-création (1993), Les Variations d'Ulysse (1995) and Cher Ulysse (2007). Les Variations d'Ulysse, commissioned by the Paris Opera, entered the Paris Opera Ballet repertoire in 1995 under the direction of Brigitte Lefèvre.

== History ==
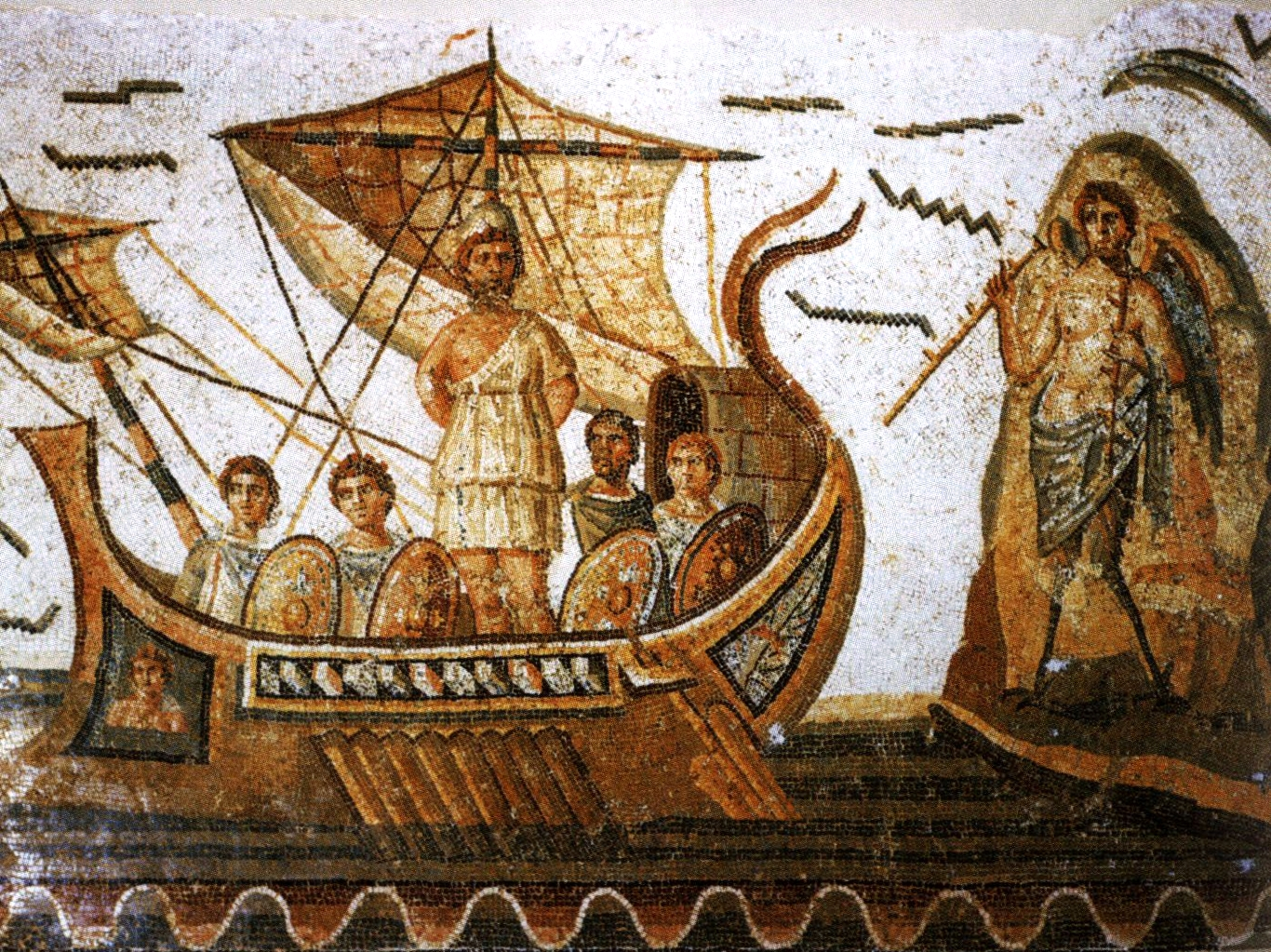
Roman mosaic from the 1st century B.C. depicting Ulysses singing to the sirens.

The ballet Ulysse is based on the central character of Homer's Odyssey, but also on Bloom from Joyce's Ulysses. The initial writing of the piece dates back to 1980, after Gallotta returned from the United States, where he had worked with Merce Cunningham, and won prizes at the International Choreographic Competition in Bagnolet (in 1976 and 1980). In 1979, he founded the Groupe Émile-Dubois and moved to Grenoble's Maison de la Culture, where he set to work on his ballet. For Jean-Claude Gallotta, however, this ballet was already in some ways a reworking of choreographic material from his previous creations, in the manner of what Cunningham described as "events", i.e. a succession of selected, mastered pieces assembled for the occasion.

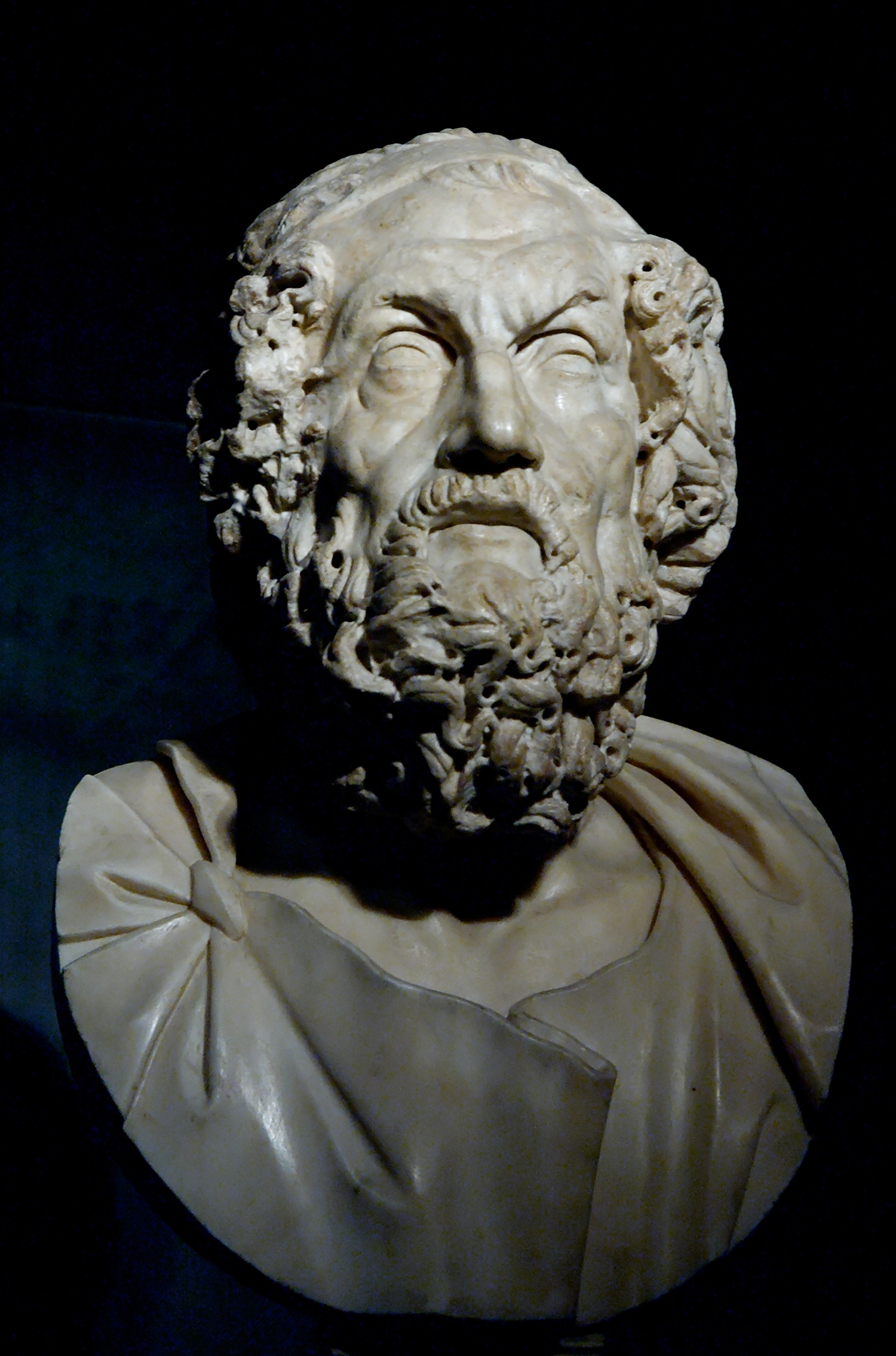
Bust of Homer, 1st century B.C.

The creation of these various little pieces originated in the period 1976-1977, when Gallotta studied with Cunningham and discovered a chondromalacia that handicapped him and blocked his ambitions for a career as a dancer. Relatively depressed by this state of affairs, he decided to invent other movements by working at home. This research led to the creation of a sketch entitled Sept Airs de cuisines, made up of movements on the spot and occasional hiccups, which later became the choreographic basis for Ulysse. The piece put together these small choreographic units through ensemble movements whose techniques were borrowed from the New York choreographer. Jean-Claude Gallotta saw his founding ballet as oscillating between two tendencies, one abstract, the other theatrical. Gallotta came up with the title of his ballet at the end of the writing process, referring to Odysseus' quest for knowledge of the world: "Like Homer's hero, I saw in it my own exile and the impossibility of reaching my own choreographic shores". From the outset, he envisaged that his ballet could be performed in a variety of dancer configurations (by children, the disabled, actors, etc.), which also justifies the different versions he would produce over the following years.

From the moment of its creation, this piece has been recognized as of major importance for French contemporary dance. Gallotta, both in terms of content, with his incessant runs and large-scale lateral movements from left to right and right to left, led by series of small, agile steps, and in terms of form, with the impact of the immaculate white costumes and sets, as well as Henri Torgue's heady music, marked the revival of group dance through his choreographic writing, strongly influenced by the uninterrupted movements of Trisha Brown and the work of Lucinda Childs, a pupil of Cunningham. Ulysse thus marked not only the culmination of the choreographer's apprenticeship, but also the emancipation and maturation of the foundations of his own style, based on the use of abstract propositions often approaching the creative gesture of the visual arts, which constituted the choreographer's primary training.

Ulysse was to be a pivotal piece for the choreographer, and the one he would revisit most frequently among his creations, notably for the purposes of transmission to new members of his company and entry into institutional repertoires. On this subject, he also declared:

A choreography is like a book, like writing, and what's interesting is to see how it holds up over time, how it transforms, how it is deformed, how it is taken over by other languages, the language of opera for example..

Over the next twenty-five years, four reference versions were created, varying in mood, music, dancers (from 8 to 14 performers, and one version for 40 dancers) and companies, but remaining faithful to the original choreographic basis. The 1995 version, entitled Les Variations d'Ulysse, was commissioned by the Paris Opera Ballet and its director Brigitte Lefèvre to open the ballet's season and marked its entry into the institution's repertoire. The Cher Ulysse version from 2007 featured two particularities: it was performed to an original electronic style by the Strigall group, abandoning the famous composition by Torgue and Houppin, and it was performed by dancers of different ages, in keeping with the principle of Trois Générations. In its first version, the piece was also adapted for the children (aged 8 to 13) of the Grenade group, directed by Josette Baïz, a choreographer and teacher based in Aix-en-Provence who had worked with children from the northern suburbs of Marseille. This version, "lively and fresh", revisited the fundamentals of the 1981 creation.

Interestingly, despite having changed the work on a recurring basis over the past twenty-five years, Jean-Claude Gallotta claims that Ulysse is not his favorite piece, but simply the one "people talk about all the time". This has been helped by the success of all four versions. He also declares that "Ulysse is not the play that represents him. It is the one that the history of dance claims to accept. It is his choreographic calling card", and says he feels closer to Grandeur nature, a much more confidential and theatrical piece.

== Critical reception ==
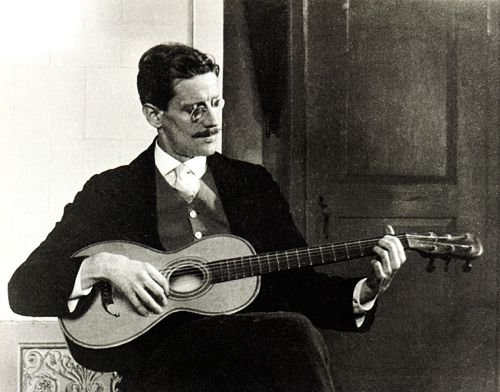
James Joyce in 1915

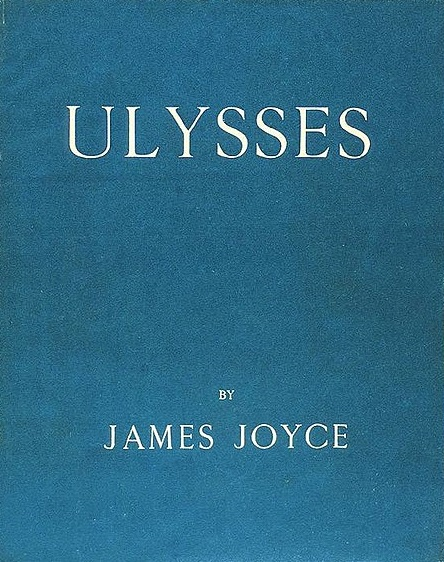
James Joyce's Ulysses, published in 1922.

Ulysse was very positively received by critics and audiences in France at the time of its premiere - it was then considered an "event" in the world of French contemporary dance - and its various versions, but also abroad, where the 1993 version made its author more widely known. In his Dictionnaire de la danse (1999), Philippe Le Moal described the work as "a choreography of the river, vigorous and serene". Considered a founding piece of new French dance - and still considered "emblematic of the choreographic creation of the 1980s" - it was seen by dance critics as one of Gallotta's pieces that "played humorously with myths, creating a mysterious world inhabited by tribes with particular rites".

However, some negative criticisms were voiced by journalists of the latest version in 2007, who questioned the need for a fourth version whose "whiteness had become tarnished" and noted the ageing and less agile nature of some of the dancers, while conceding that the "show was perfectly acceptable".

== The different versions and their technical specifications ==
=== First version: Ulysse (1981) ===
- Choreography: Jean-Claude Gallotta
- Dancers: Mathilde Altaraz, Annie Delichères, Cathy Cambet, Anne-Marie Moenne-Loccoz, Josette Baïz, Jean-Claude Gallotta, Pascal Gravat, Robert Seyfried
- Music: Henry Torgue and Gilles Jaloustre
- Set and Costume Design: Jean-Yves Langlais
- Lighting: Jean-Marie Payerne
- Premiere: March 13, 1981 at the Maison de la Culture, Grenoble
- Running time: approx. 90 minutes

This version was remounted in 1983 for the Théâtre de la Ville in Paris in a more pared-down version, with no set, replaced by a white, vaporous tulle curtain, and the striking presence of a turkey left free to roam the back of the stage. The show was filmed by Claude Mouriéras. Due to its success in France and the "French spirit" that the piece conveys, Ulysse was programmed by the organizers of the 1984 Los Angeles Olympic Games festivities at the Olympic Art Festival, then at the American Dance Festival.

In October 2007, Josette Baïz remounted this version for children aged 8 to 13. The choreographer-educator was a dancer in the 1981 creation and, following her collaboration with Gallotta on Trois Générations, she decided, with his agreement, to adapt the original choreography to the technical capacities of young children, remaining as close as possible to the spirit of the original piece, making it a revival rather than a re-creation. To this end, she decoded and transcribed the various components of Ulysses from period video footage and her own memories as a dancer, while eliminating the erotic aspects, the contact between dancers, the lifts and certain sections deemed too technically difficult for young children. Josette Baïz's adaptation, on the other hand, sought to rediscover the "emotion" of the original piece, by playing on the children's interpretation. The premiere took place at Grenoble's Maison de la culture, then toured throughout France until 2010.

=== Second version: Ulysses, re-création (1993) ===
- Choreography: Jean-Claude Gallotta
- Dancers: Mathilde Altaraz, Anna Ariatta, Julia Barker, Karoline Boureau, Prisca Harsch, Geneviève Reynaud, Darrell Davis, Massimo Giorgi, Natacha Mas, Samuel Mathieu, William Patinot, Thierry Verger.
- Music: Ulysse by Henry Torgue and Serge Houppin
- Set and Costume Design: Jean-Yves Langlais, assisted by Marion Mercier
- Lighting: Manuel Bernard, assisted by Jacques Albert
- Premiere of second version: 1993 at Festival de Châteauvallon
- Production: Groupe Émile Dubois Centre chorégraphique national de Grenoble, Maison de la culture de Grenoble, Théâtre de la Ville, and Châteauvallon (national stage)
- Running time: approx. 65 minutes
- Performances: over 50

This version was the first real recreation of the work by its author. It was adapted for eleven dancers - instead of the original eight - and was performed without Gallotta. The set design remained equally uncluttered, with a simple white backdrop illuminated by a complex array of white light variations and a moving ceiling. This version paid explicit tribute to New York choreographer Yvonne Rainer, whose name is mentioned in the middle of the piece by a dancer with a megaphone. First performed in 1993, it was also filmed.

=== Third version: Les Variations d'Ulysse (1995) ===
- Choreography: Jean-Claude Gallotta
- Dancers: Star dancers Patrick Dupond and Marie-Claude Pietragalla or Jean-Guillaume Bart and Carole Arbo, principal dancers and the Paris Opera Ballet (directed by Brigitte Lefèvre)
- Music: Jean-Pierre Drouet
- Set and Costume Design: Jean-Yves Langlais
- Lighting: Dominique Bruguière
- Premiere: 1995 at Opéra Bastille, Paris
- Performances: 6

For this version, Brigitte Lefèvre imposed two conditions on the choreographer in order to bring this contemporary work into the repertoire. The first involved extending the piece from eight to forty dancers, in order to satisfy the Paris Opéra's operating procedures. The second concerned the music, whose initial composition did not correspond to the institution's taste and which therefore had to be rewritten. While Gallotta had planned to ask Peter Gabriel to write an original composition for this version, Brigitte Lefèvre asked him to meet with composer Jean-Pierre Drouet, which quickly laid the foundations for the ballet's choreographic constraints in terms of rhythm and movement. Ulysse thus had the distinction of being the world's first well-known choreographic work to coexist with two different scores. From the outset, Gallotta rewrote the piece with Patrick Dupond, Marie-Claude Pietragalla and Carole Arbo in mind. He also re-cut the piece into twenty-four distinct tableaux, as many as there are songs in the Odyssey.

Jean-Claude Gallotta worked with Mathilde Altaraz, his partner and dancer, to rewrite Ulysse, adapting the piece to the new stage and ballet ensemble arrangements. The apprenticeship with the Corps de Ballet of the Paris Opera Ballet took place over a period of just four weeks, a normal duration for the institution, but unusual for Gallotta. Gallotta took charge of teaching the basis and spirit of his work to this new type of performer, while Mathilde Altaraz was in charge of rehearsals. Due to scheduling constraints at the Opéra Bastille, this version was given only 6 performances.

In 1996, Les Variations d'Ulysse won a Victoire de la musique classique award in the choreographic production category.

=== Fourth version: Dear Ulysses (2007) ===
- Choreography: Jean-Claude Gallotta
- Dancers: Françoise Bal-Goetz, Darrell Davis, Xiména Figueroa, Marie Fonte, Ibrahim Guétissi, Mathieu Heyraud, Benjamin Houal, Yannick Hugron, Cécile Renard, Thierry Verger, Loriane Wagner, Béatrice Warrand and Jean-Claude Gallotta
- Dramaturgy: Claude-Henri Buffard
- Music: Ull by Strigall
- Set design: Jeanne Dard (spaces) and Marie-Christine Soma (lighting)
- Costume Design: Marion Mercier and Anne Jonathan
- Production: Centre chorégraphique national de Grenoble, Maison de la culture de Grenoble, Théâtre national de Chaillot.
- Premiere: October 12, 2007 at Théâtre national de Chaillot, Paris, France
- Running time: approx. 70 minutes
- Performances: approx. 50

This version differed profoundly from its predecessors in its scenic approach. New music was composed by Strigall - a musical ensemble that had worked with Gallotta at the Maison de la Culture de Grenoble since the early 2000s - adding a third alternative score to the same choreography. This latest composition, based on electronic music, was much more violent and mechanical, creating, with the space illuminated zenithally by a sixty neon ceiling lamp projecting a harsh light just above the dancers, a very particular atmosphere, deliberately harsher and less vaporous than the previous versions. The minimalist set was made up of three white tarpaulins, lowered to a height of one metre, surrounding the three sides of the stage like sails. The choreography, close to the original, was performed by dancers of varying ages, from 30 to 65. In this, Jean-Claude Gallotta returned to his work on Trois générations, based on the juxtaposition of each dancer's interpretation and singular movements according to the age of their bodies. While earlier versions of Ulysses referred more to Homer's text, the influence of James Joyce's novel is more strongly felt in the latest version of the piece, where Gallotta himself declared on stage that Ulysses had "become Bloom, Joyce's wandering Jew" rather than Homer's hero. Gallotta himself performed, like an Aoidos or a Ringmaster playing the white clown, microphone or megaphone in hand, pacing the stage or sitting on a small stool upstage.

Created in 2007, this version was once again filmed.

== Bibliography ==
- Louppe, Laurence; Schefer, Jean-Louis; Claude-Henri Buffard, Claude-Henri Buffard (1988). Jean-Claude Gallotta, groupe Émile Dubois (in French). Paris: éditions Dis Voir. ISBN 2-906571-06-7.
- Gallotta, Jean-Claude; Lambours, Xavier (1998). Les Variations d'Ulysse. éditions Lansman. ISBN 2-87282-216-X.
