= Facchetti =

Facchetti (pronounced [fakˈketti]) is an Italian surname from Lombardy. Notable people with the surname include:

- Giacinto Facchetti (1942–2006), Italian footballer
- Paul Facchetti (1912–2010), Italian-French gallery owner and photographer
- Pietro Facchetti (1539–1613), Italian painter

== See also ==
- Facchin
- Facchina
- Facchinetti
- Facchini
