= Charles Delahaye =

Charles Delahaye may refer to:

- Charles Delahaye (ice hockey)
- Charles Delahaye (tennis)
