= Fachin (disambiguation) =

Fachin, fachan or fachen is a monster or giant described by John Francis Campbell in Popular Tales of the West Highlands as having a single eye, a single hand, and a single leg.

Fachin may also refer to:

- Fâchin, a commune in Nièvre, Bourgogne-Franche-Comté, France
- Fachin (surname)
- Fa chin, the Wade-Giles romanization of fa jin (a Chinese martial arts concept)

== See also ==
- Fachine (Chiliotrichum diffusum), a species of small shrub in the family, Asteraceae
