= Facchin =

Facchin (Italian: [fakˈkin], Venetian: [faˈkiŋ]) is an Italian surname. Notable people with the surname include:

- Andrea Facchin (born 1978), Italian canoeist
- Carlo Facchin (1938–2022), Italian football manager and player
- Davide Facchin (born 1987), Italian footballer
- Marino Facchin (1913–1979), Italian boxer

== See also ==
- Fachin (surname)
- Facchetti
- Facchina
- Facchinetti
- Facchini
