= Antoine Stinco =

French architect (1934–2023)

- Born: 9 January 1934; Tunis, French protectorate of Tunisia
- Died: 14 February 2023 (aged 89); Paris, France
- Occupation: Architect
- Website: www.stinco.fr

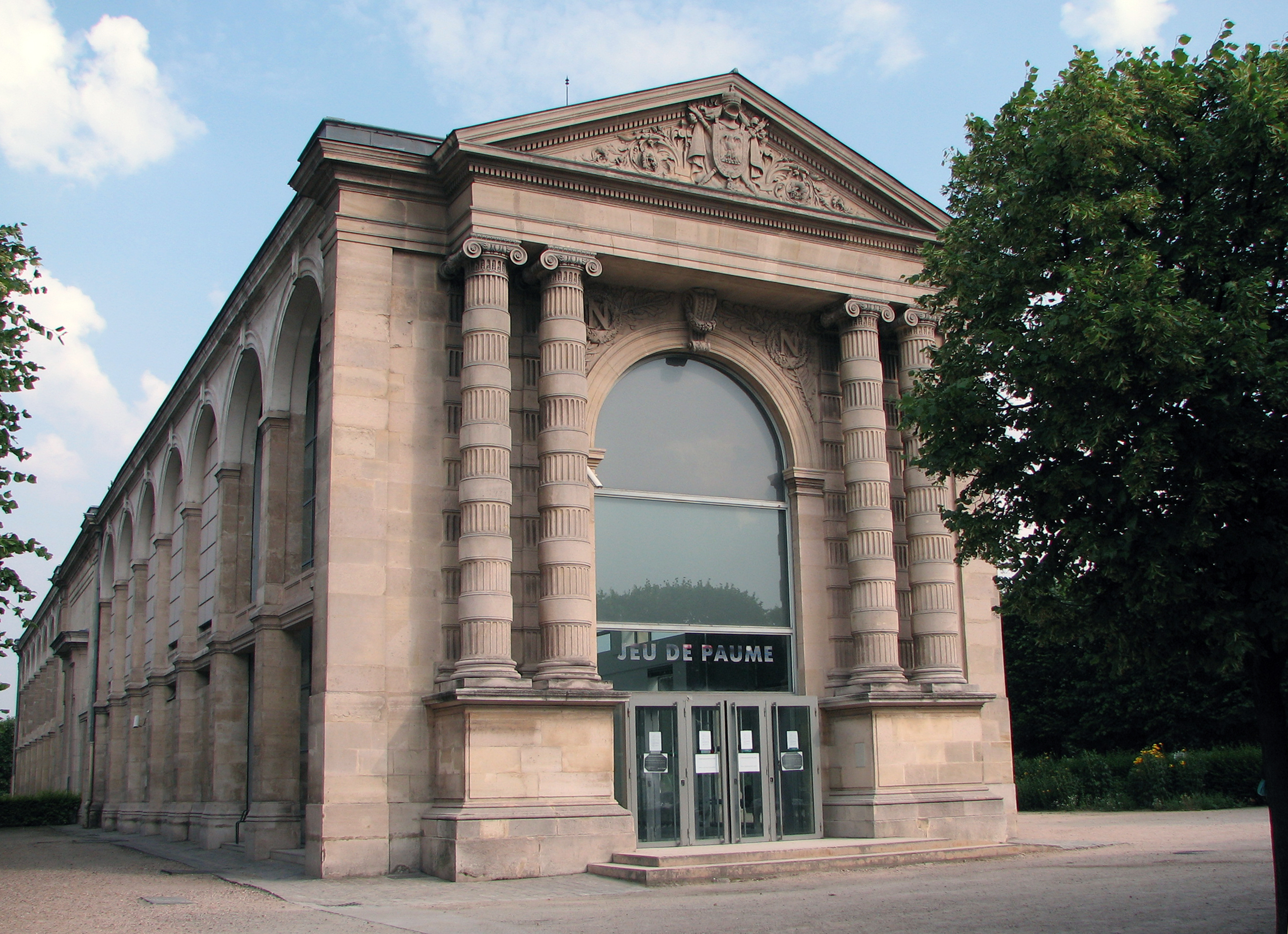
Galerie nationale du Jeu de Paume, Tuileries gardens, Paris

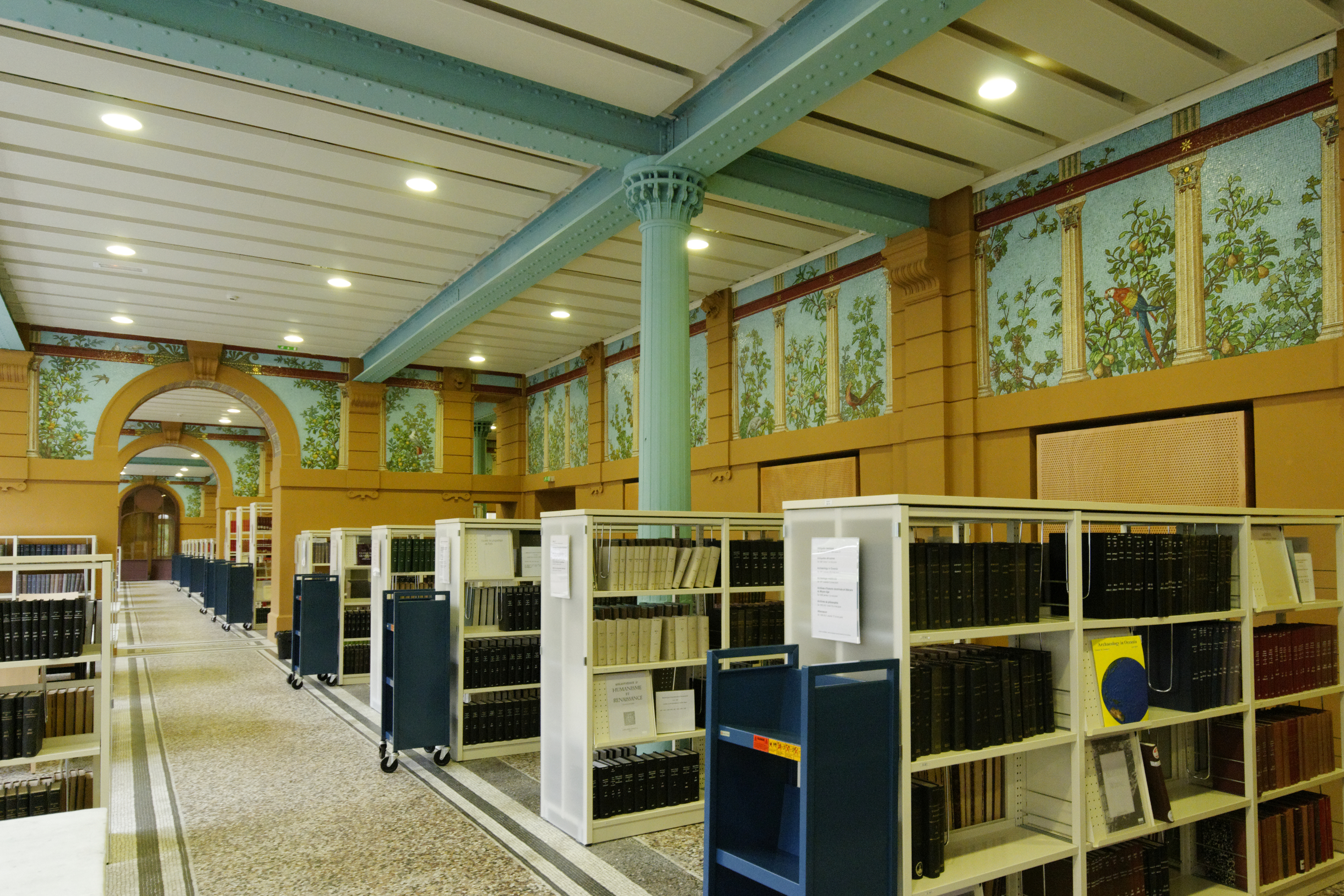
Former refectory of the Bibliothèque Sainte-Barbe, with mosaics by Giandomenico Facchina

Antoine Stinco (9 January 1934 – 14 February 2023) was a French architect who specialized in the construction and renovation of museums and exhibition rooms.

== Early years ==
Stinco was born in Tunis, Tunisia, and studied at the École nationale supérieure des Beaux-Arts in Paris in the studio of Edouard Albert, Paul Herbé and Jean Prouvé. In 1967 Stinco and fellow-architects Jean Aubert and Jean-Paul Jungmann formed the group "Utopie" along with sociologists Hubert Tonka, Jean Baudrillard and others. Their goal was to create buildings that would be buoyant, mobile and ephemeral, in contrast to the intert and repressed post-war architecture of the time. The architects organized an exhibition in March 1968 at the Musee d'Art Moderne de la Ville de Paris called "Structures Gonflables". Stinco contributed the design for an inflatable mobile exhibition hall in which everyday things would be exhibited, drawing on the work of German structural engineer Frei Otto for the bubble-based form and on the philosophy of the Marxist Henri Lefebvre for the commonplace exhibits.

== Later work and philosophy ==
Stinco later moved into a more conventional office-based architectural practice. From 1974 to 1976 he participated with GAU (Urban Architecture Group) in a project to renew urban architecture in France. In 1984 he opened his own architectural firm. Between 1993 and 1999 he taught in the sculpture department at the Beaux-Art in Paris.

He was given the job of renovating the 1968 Maison de la Culture in Grenoble and adding a new wing, with the work completed in 2004. He said that he saw the challenge as "unlocking a building suspended above a green space, without resisting its architecture. I did not want to arrive at a vocabulary that opposed this building which symbolizes Grenoble's 'heroic period'...". Talking of his construction of new buildings at the Musée des Beaux-Arts d'Angers, he said "I set myself a rule: release me from flat and literal compliance with the architecture of the past, and also from the ridiculous fear of not being 'modern'".

Stinco occasionally wrote essays on the relationship between architecture and society, some of which were published in specialised journals such as L'Architecture Denosjours. In these he emphasised the need for architectural practice to retain an experimental dimension even with conventional commissions. Towards the end of his career he was invited to speak at conventions on museum design in France. Journalist Nicole Renoir analysed the general theme of his contributions to these discussions as being his emphasis on "versatility": the conviction that the design of public buildings should retain a distinctive character while still being adaptable to shifting future uses.

Stinco died in Paris on 24 February 2023, at the age of 89.

== Sample projects ==
With his company he specializes in construction and renovation of museums and exhibition rooms. Examples of his work

- Renovations of the Galerie nationale du Jeu de Paume, Tuileries Gardens in Paris (1987-1991)
- Six kiosks in Tuilerie garden in Paris (1993–1996)
- Renovation and extension of the Maison de la Culture de Grenoble, 2004
- Renovation of the old Collège Sainte-Barbe, which became the Bibliothèque Sainte-Barbe in 2009
- Théâtre National de Bretagne in 2008
- Gallery of modern and contemporary art, Toulouse
- New buildings at the Musée des Beaux-Arts d'Angers
- Development of new premises for the Musée du Pays Châtillonnais in Châtillon-sur-Seine in 2009
