= Fachin (surname) =

Fachin is a surname. Notable people with the surname include:

- Edson Fachin (born 1958), Brazilian jurist and lawyer
- Eria Fachin (1960–1996), Canadian dance pop singer

== See also ==
- Fachie
- Facchin
- Sachin (given name)
