= Fachie =

Fachie is a surname. Notable people with the surname include:

- Lora Fachie (born 1988), English racing cyclist
- Neil Fachie (born 1984), British Paralympic athlete

== See also ==
- Fachin (surname)
