= Sainte-Barbe Library =

Bibliothèque Sainte-Barbe
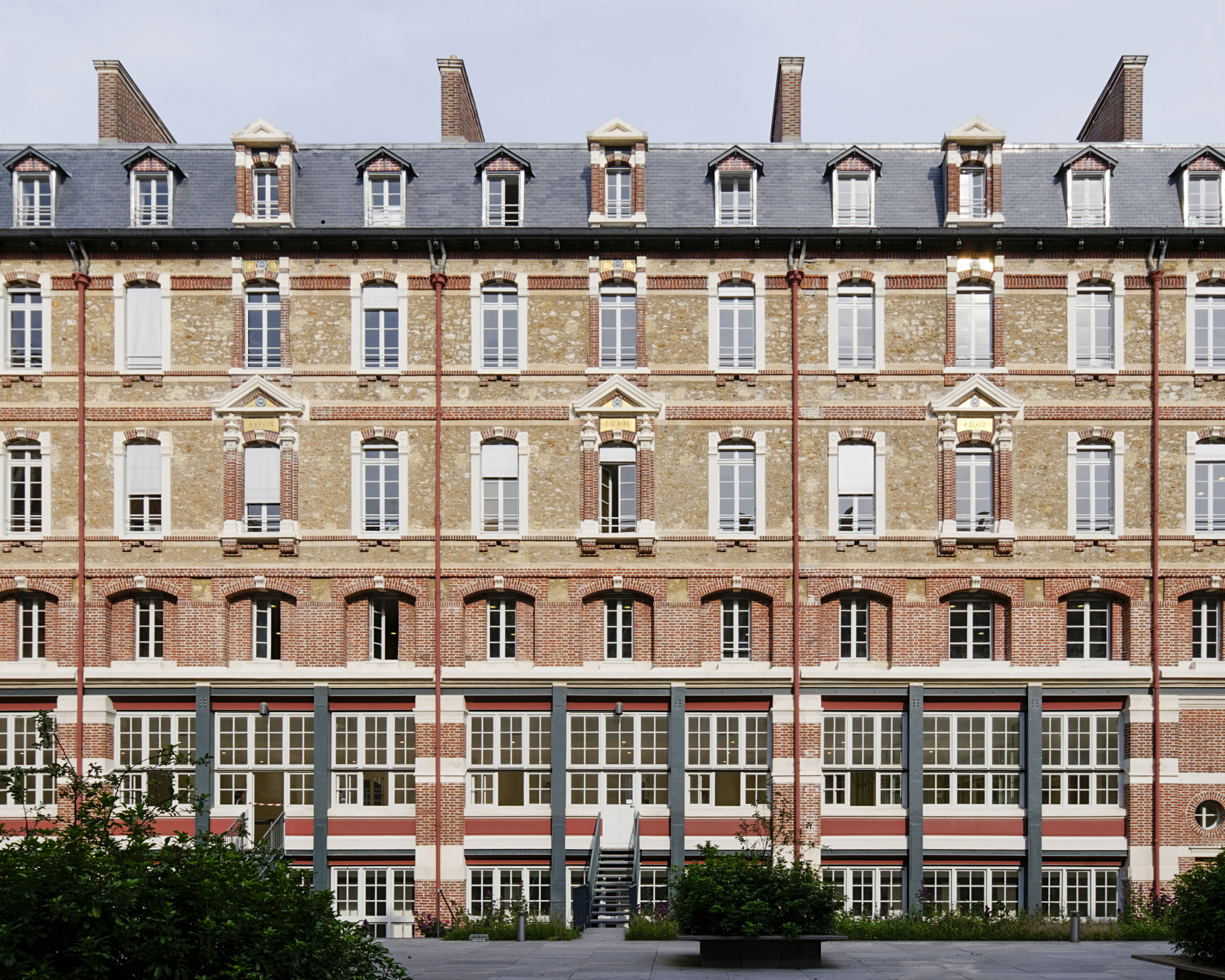
- The building along Rue Valette, seen from the court
- 48.847507°N 2.346600°E
- Location: Paris, France
- Established: March 9, 2009

Other information
- Website: www.bsb.univ-paris3.fr

Sainte-Barbe Library (French: Bibliothèque Sainte-Barbe) is an inter-university library in Paris, France, that opened in March 2009. It is located in the buildings of the former Collège Sainte-Barbe, and has been registered as a historical monument since 9 December 1999.

== History ==
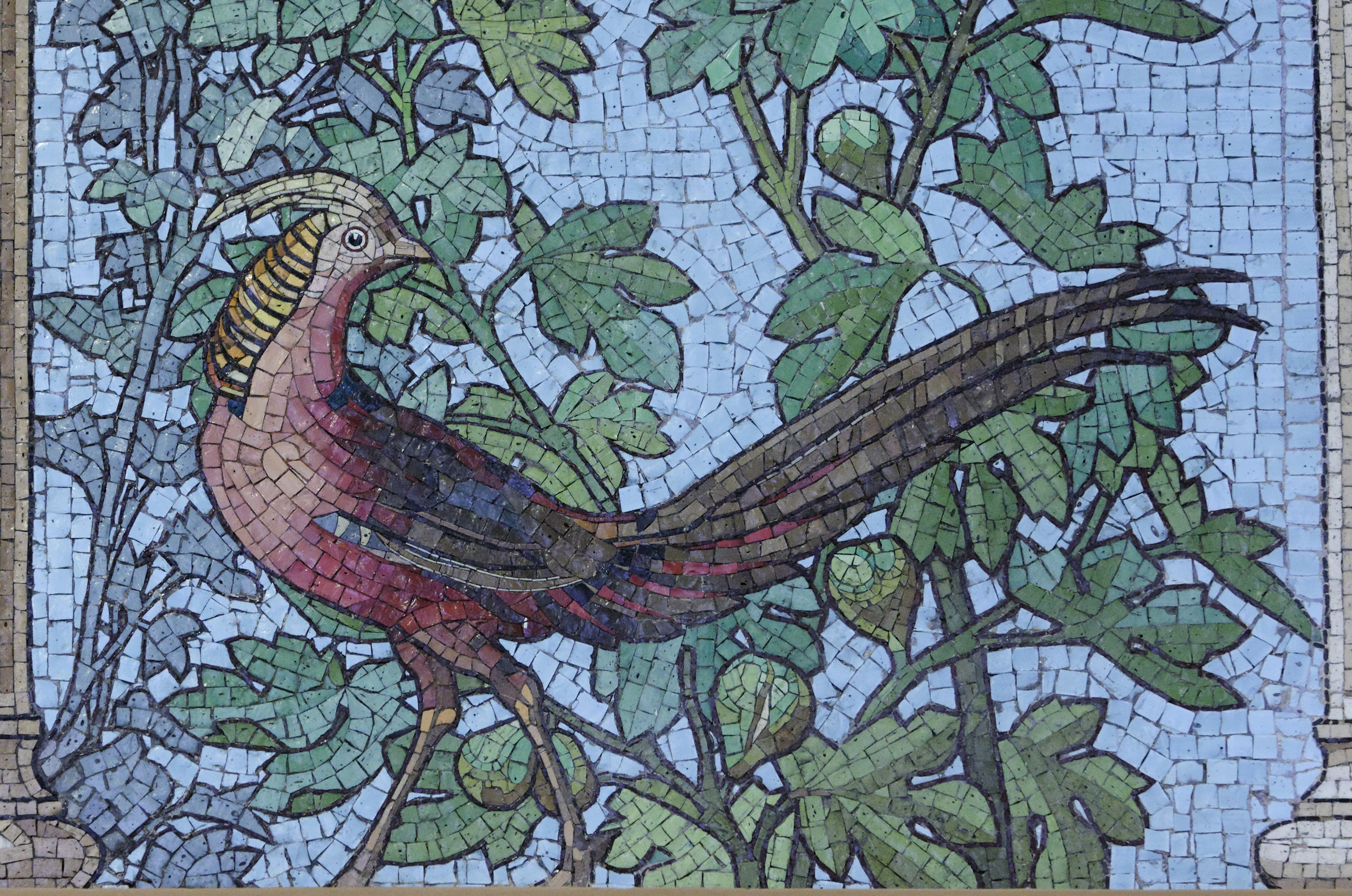
The old refectory is decorated with mosaics by Giandomenico Facchina.

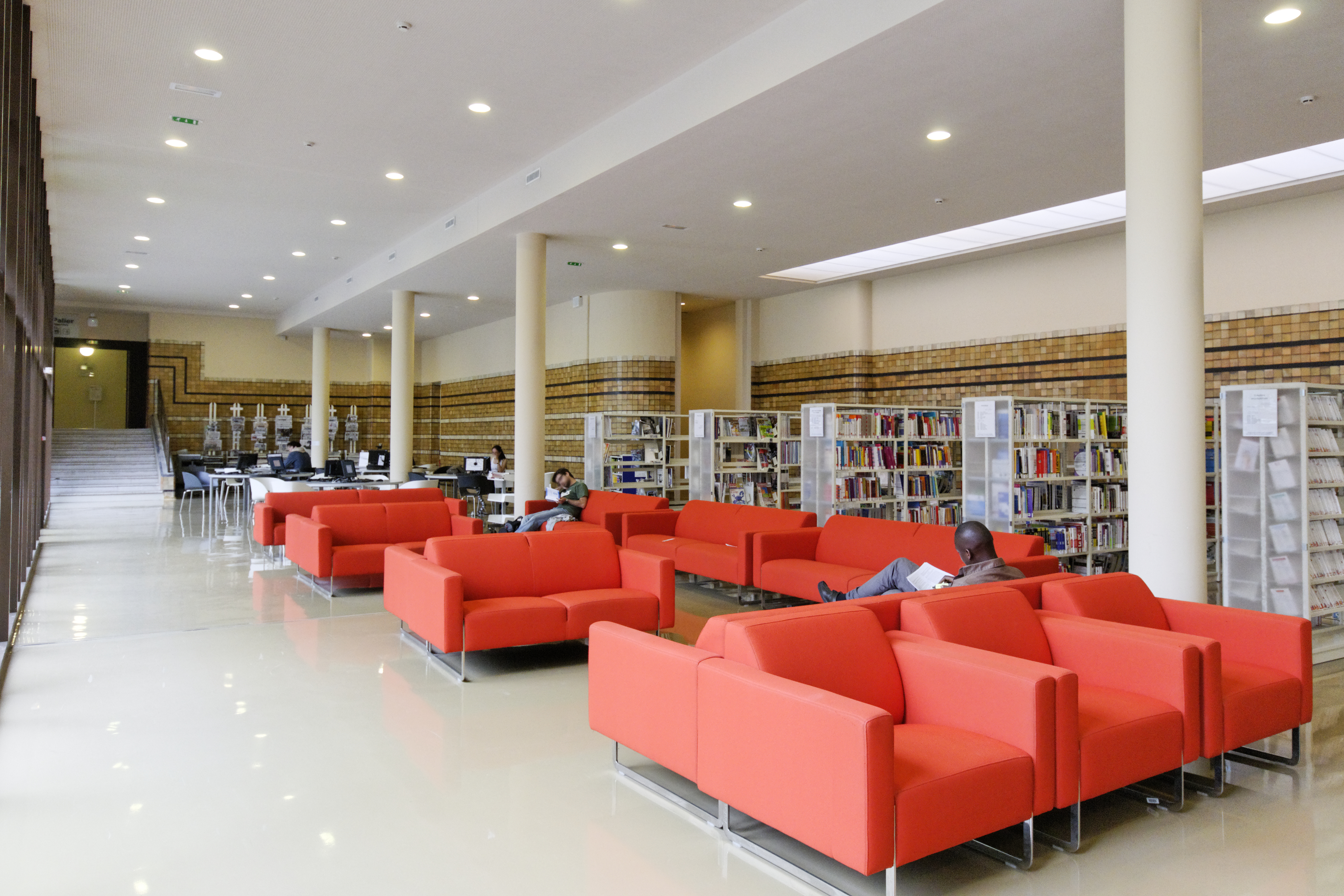
Periodical room

The College of St. Barbara was founded in 1460 by Geoffrey Lenormant. Directed by Ernest Lheureux, a pupil of Theodore Labrouste, construction of the Chartière and Valette buildings was undertaken between 1881 and 1884. Dating from 1936, the construction of the Écosse (Scotland) wing by Daniel Lionel and Raoul Brandon was completed in 1939.

The transformation of Santa Barbara library is part of the U3M (Universities for the Third Millennium) plan, a program for development of higher education and research in the Ile-de-France. Formally established by Decree No. 2004-1121 of 14 October 2004, the inter-university library of St. Barbara is administratively attached to the University of Paris III: Sorbonne Nouvelle, and a preparatory team worked 60 rue de Wattignies (Paris 12) between 2001 and 2008.

In February 2008, the team settled permanently in the premises of the College Sainte-Barbe located at 4 rue Valette (Paris 5), renovated by the architect Antoine Stinco. Open to the public since 9 March 2009, it shares a portion of its premises with the library of the Sorbonne from May 2010 during its renovation.

== Purpose ==
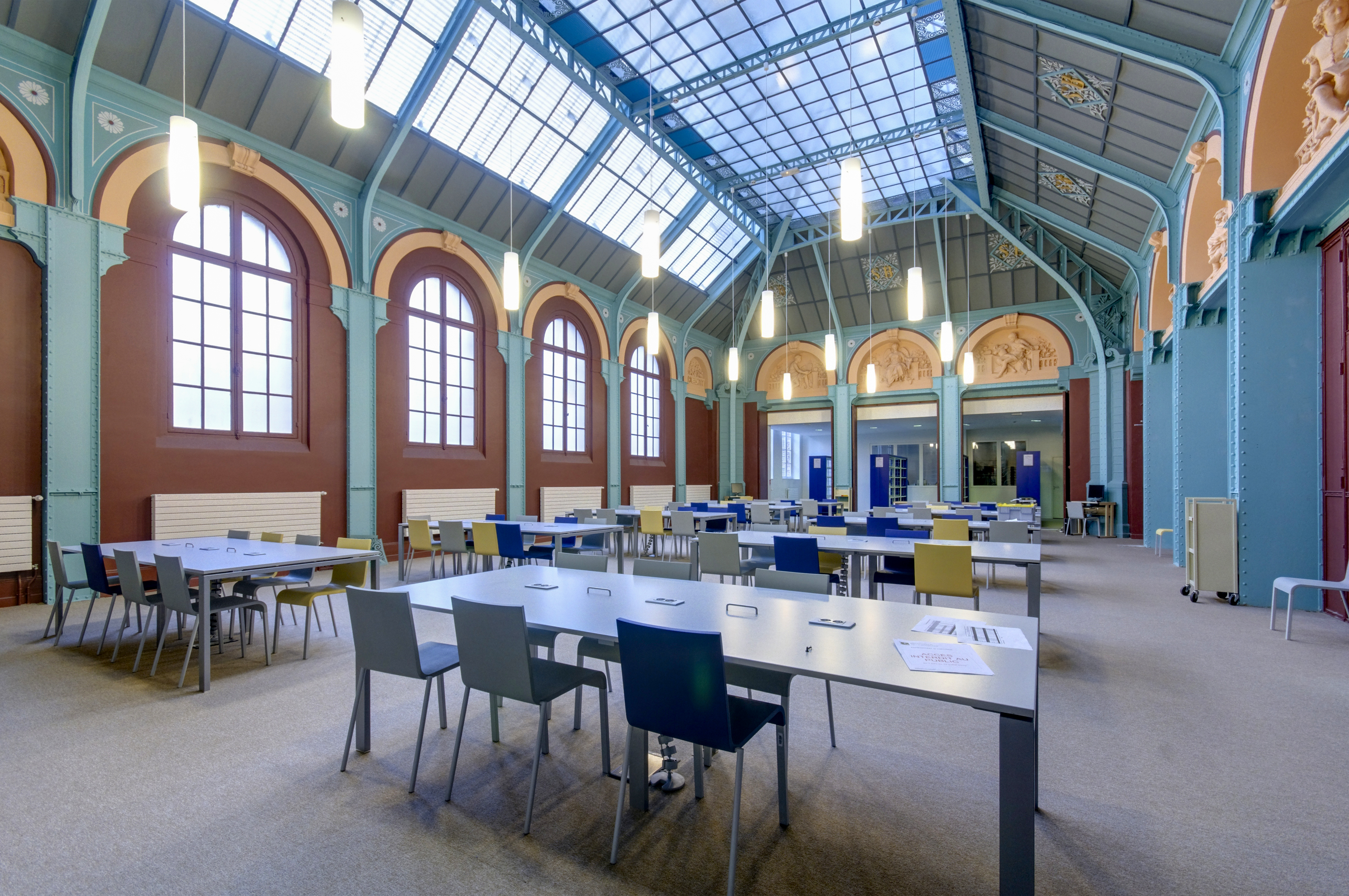
Metallic architecture of the old drawing room

Situated in the immediate vicinity of the Sainte-Geneviève and Cujas libraries, Sainte-Barbe offers open access to collections on law, economics, social sciences, languages, literature and arts.

== Operation ==
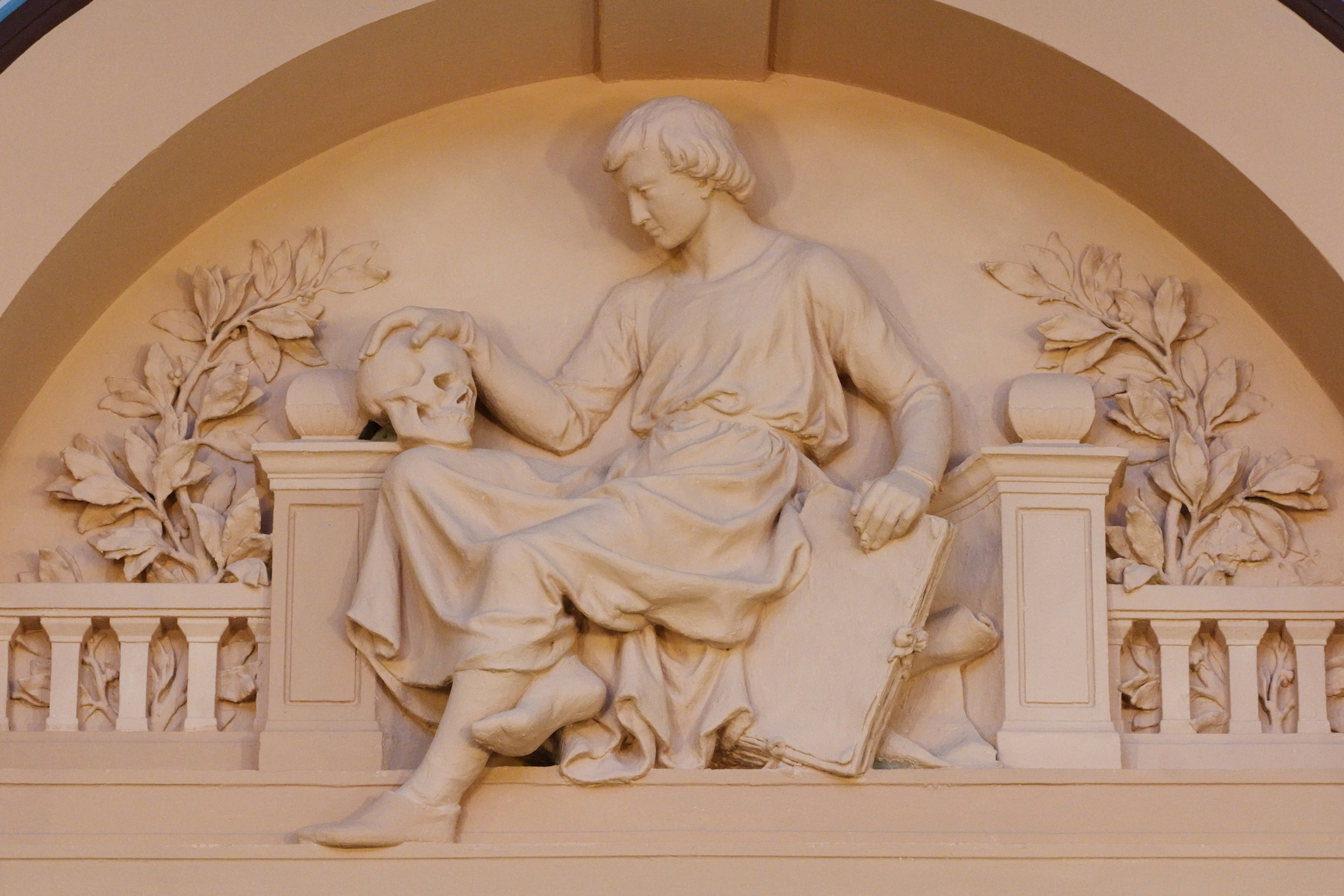
Bas-relief of Charles Gauthier in the drawing room

Open from 10am to 8pm from Monday to Saturday, the library serves undergraduates and students of Masters courses at public universities in Paris and the Ile de France, with a potential readership of 100,000 students. To this should be added students in preparatory classes to the grandes ecoles.

== Amenities ==
- 800 working places equipped with electrical outlets for laptops
- 200 computer workstations providing access to databases and online periodicals, with office tools, catalogs and Internet access
- 40 computers available on loan
- 120,000 volumes with open access and available on loan
- collections fully equipped with RFID technology, which automates lending and returns
- rooms for group work (50 seats total)
- a reading room for the French and foreign daily press
- two reading rooms for the library of the Sorbonne during its renovation.

The entire building is accessible to disabled people. All print and electronic collections is accessible to the visually impaired and blind.

== See also ==
- List of libraries in France
