= Maison de la culture de Grenoble =

Events venue in France

MC2
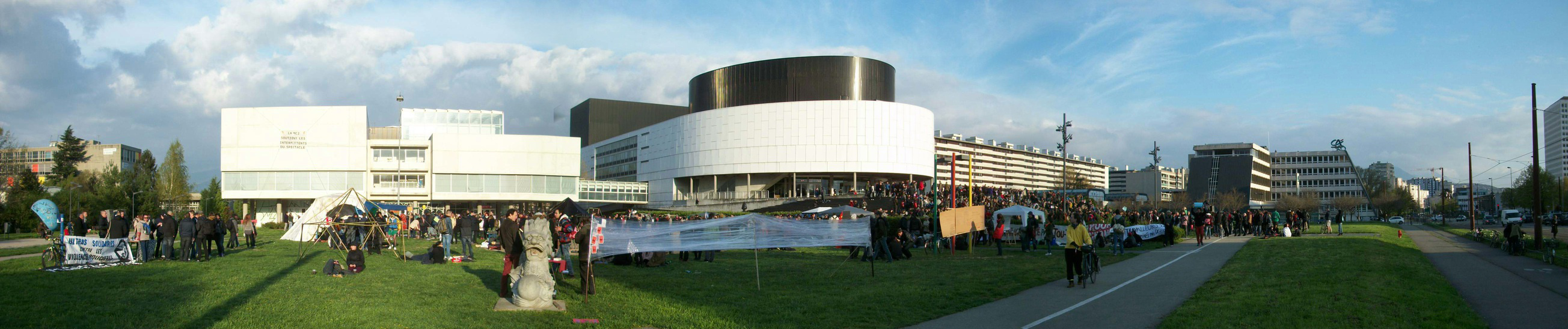
- Maison de la Culture de Grenoble

- Location within France
- Address: Grenoble; France
- Coordinates: 45.172266°N 5.732911°E

Construction
- Opened: 3 February 1968
- Reopened: 17 September 2004
- Architects: André Wogenscky; Renovation Antoine Stinco

Website
- www.mc2grenoble.fr

The Maison de la Culture de Grenoble, commonly called MC2, is a public venue for public events located on the Avenue Marcellin-Berthelot in Grenoble, France.

== History ==
Built by André Wogenscky on the occasion of the 1968 Winter Olympics, MC2 was inaugurated on 3 February 1968 by André Malraux, Minister of Cultural Affairs and the father of the concept of houses of culture. The following year, in April 1969, another major cultural institution in the city, the Conservatory of Grenoble was installed close to the Maison de la Culture. In the 1980s the building was called "Le Cargo".

The Maison de la Culture has been called MC2 since 17 September 2004 when it reopened after extensive rehabilitation and expansion at a cost of €38 million, covered 42.3% by the city, 40% by the state, 10.7% by the department and 8% by the Region. The MC2 has four auditoriums, two of which can seat 1,000 people. The main hall, which is lined with wood panelling, was built during the renovation work to replace a rotating theatre. It can host a wide range of events and orchestral formations. While this work was being undertaken, shows were played outside the walls. Attendance after the expansion has reached 100,000 spectators per year.

== Operations ==
The MC2 is a "public institution of cultural co-operation" (établissement public de coopération culturelle) funded by the Ministry of Culture, the City of Grenoble and the Isère General Council. It is a national institution directed by Jean-Paul Angot.

It comprises the National Choreographic Centre for Contemporary Dance led by Jean-Claude Gallotta, the Alpine National Drama Centre led by Jacques Osinski, and Les Musiciens du Louvre led by Marc Minkowski.

In 2010, the institution's budget was 9.3 million euros per year. The premises are designed to accommodate a variety of events. Since 2007 the Estates General of the Renewal are organised in January by the newspaper Libération. Nearly 20,000 people attended the debate every year.

== Rooms ==
- 1,028-seat hall
- Auditorium with 998 seats
- Room with 244 seats
- 700 square metres (7,500 sq ft) room
- Theater rehearsal studio
- Two dance studios and a recording studio.
