= Gilbert Facchinetti =

Italian-Swiss entrepreneur (1936–2018)

Personal details
- Born: 28 January 1936 Lausanne, Switzerland
- Died: 6 July 2018 (aged 82) Neuchâtel, Switzerland
- Relatives: Mickaël Facchinetti (grandson and footballer)
- Occupation: President of Neuchâtel Xamax

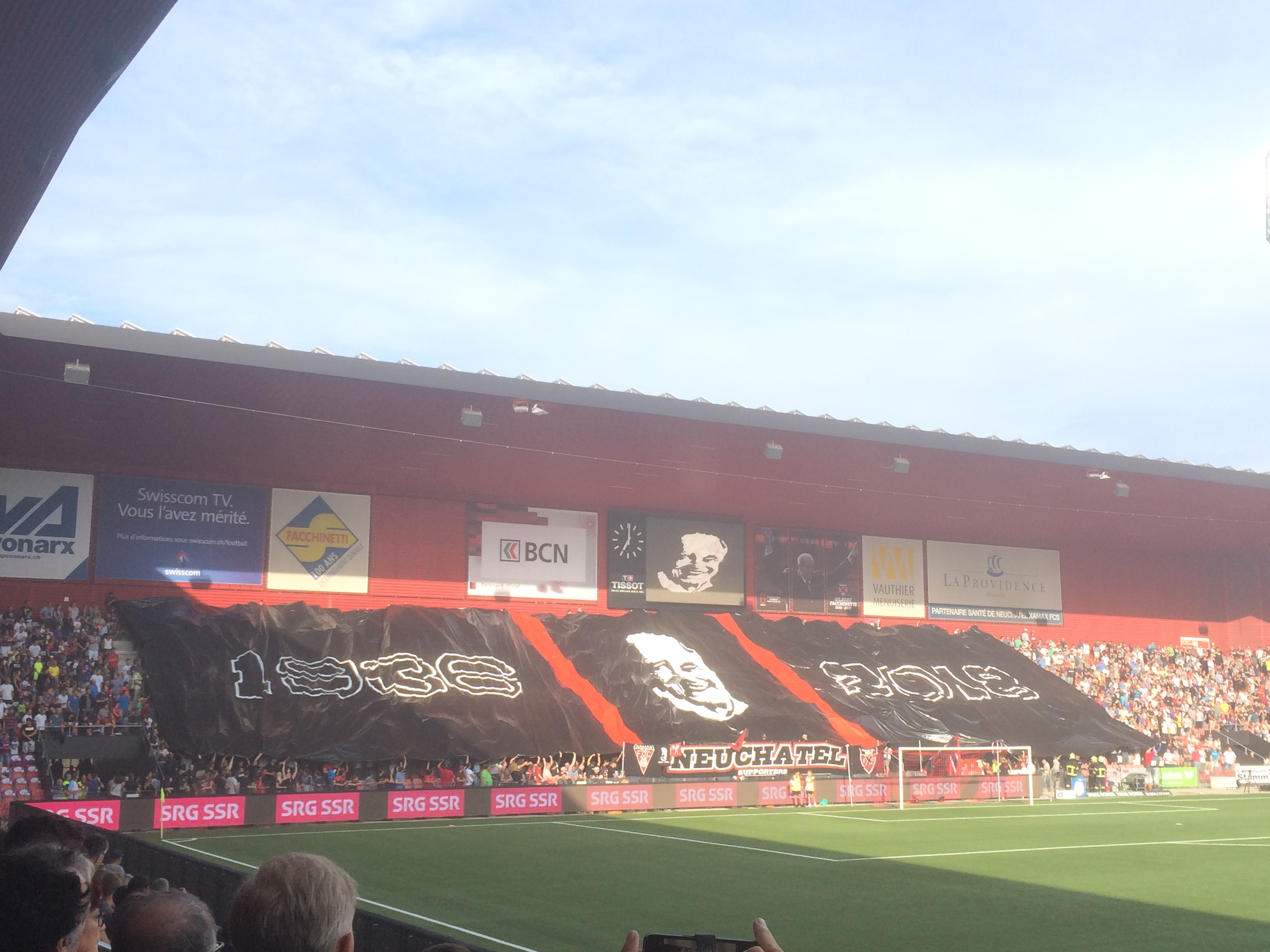
Gilbert facchinetti hommage in july 2018.jpg

Gilbert Facchinetti (28 January 1936 – 6 July 2018) was an Italian-Swiss entrepreneur, best known as president of Neuchâtel Xamax.

== Biography ==
Facchinetti was born in Lausanne, Switzerland to a family from Italy. After a butcher's apprenticeship, he played at Servette FC and later received an offer from Genoa, with a salary of 6,000 Swiss francs per month. When his uncle died, Facchinetti was pushed by his father to enter the family business, which was an architectural firm. He played one last match in the national league in 1969 with FC Cantonal Neuchâtel. Ten years later, in 1979, he took over the management of Neuchâtel Xamax, a club created by the merger between FC Cantonal Neuchâtel and FC Xamax. A true patriarch, he took his club to two Swiss championship titles in 1987 and 1988. Knowing how to mobilize the economic fabric of Neuchâtel to the point that "when a tunnel was digging in town, it meant, basically, that a new striker was going to sign with the club," he signed players like Heinz Hermann, Uli Stielike, Hossam Hassan, Lajos Detári, or coach Gilbert Gress.

A man of speech, Facchinetti signed his contracts with a handshake until two players ask him for large sums without respecting the handshake.

He left the executive director position of his club in 2003 to Alain Pedretti, having spent twenty-four years as the head. He remained nevertheless the honorary president of the club until his death. In 2012, he officially rejoined the club following a bankruptcy.

Facchinetti died on July 6, 2018, in Neuchâtel, shortly after having seen the promotion of his club of heart in Swiss first division.

== Family ==
Facchinetti's grandson, Mickaël Facchinetti, is a professional footballer.
