= Charles Delahaye (tennis) =

19th century jeu de paume player in France

Charles Delahaye (French pronunciation: [ʃaʁl dəlaɛ]), also known as "Biboche," (born July 24, 1825 and died 1906) was a jeu de paume player in 19th-century France.

== Background ==
Henri Delahaye, Biboche's father, kept a court in Amiens and previously had a court in Geneva. With his father's tuition, Biboche's game soon improved and by the age of 15 he was attached to the court in the Passage Sandrié. Here, he played with J. Edmond Barre and the amateur, M. Mosneron, and soon came second in prowess only to Barre himself. His prime was in 1850-60. He was known as the best living teacher of the gamę, and as the able and courteous manager of the French courts. In 1848 he defeated Peter Tompkins at Hampton Court and in 1851 twice defeated his son, Edmund, at Oxford and James Street.

Biboche eventually became maître paumier (palm master) of the "Passage Sandrié, and on its demolition in 1861 took over the Tuileries Gardens court, retiring thirty-four years later in 1896." Similar to other great professionals, he was fond of bizarre handicaps and once played a "match wearing the full dress uniform of the National Guard, wielding his racket in his right hand and a musket with fixed bayonet in his left."

In 1861, Napoleon III tasked Delahaye with overseeing the construction of the Jeu De Paume. Delahaye commissioned Melchior Viraut to design the building and it opened on January 15th, 1862. Fifteen years later, Delahaye had Viraut design a second court on the East side of the building. Unfortunately, Delahaye's court fell into disuse by the early twentieth century and became an exhibition space in 1909.
