= Jean-Pierre Drouet =

French composer

Jean-Pierre Drouet (born 30 October 1935) is a French multi-instrumentist percussionist and composer.

Born in Bordeaux, Drouet studied with René Leibowitz, Jean Barraqué and André Hodeir. In India, he deepened his knowledge of non-European instruments and music, such as the tabla and especially the tonbak (Persian drum) that he studied with Djamchid Chemirani.

He is remarkable especially for the eclecticism and quantity of his musical production, as a performer and as a composer.

== Collaborations ==
Drouet took part very early in the development of "new European improvised music" alongside Vinko Globokar and Michel Portal. In a more classical register, he will play, among others, on the records of Les Double Six, and accompany Line Renaud at the Casino de Paris. It is on this occasion, at the instigation of Pierre Urban, that he discovered the tonbak.

But it is especially in the field of contemporary music that he will distinguish himself, in particular by his participation in the shows of the Atelier théâtre et musique (ATEM), with Georges Aperghis, Michael Lonsdale and Édith Scob, the foundation of the "Trio Le Cercle" with Willy Coquillat and Gaston Sylvestre, his collaborations with Mauricio Kagel and all the major composers of contemporary music of the 1960s and 1970s (in particular Luciano Berio, Karlheinz Stockhausen and Iannis Xenakis).

He also performed alongside Sylvio Gualda and the Katia and Marielle Labèque sisters around Bartók's Sonata for Two Pianos and Percussion.

Exuberant and virtuoso on stage, he will often be the performer of shows of instrumental and musical theatre.

He was heavily involved in the development of the tonbak (Persian drum) in France, notably through the creation of pieces by contemporary composers, but also through its use in jazz and improvised music. He taught this instrument at the Conservatoire Expérimental de Pantin from 1980 to 1984 to musicians like François Bedel, Pablo Cueco, Pierre Rigopoulos, Alexandre Régis, Jean Pierlot and a few others...

As a composer, he often writes music for the theater and all forms of the performing arts: dance with Jean-Claude Gallotta for Les Variations d'Ulysse given in 1995 at the Opéra Bastille and awarded a Victoire de la musique classique, Bartabas's equestrian shows etc.

== Discography ==
- Béla Bartók's Sonata for Two Pianos and Percussion with Katia and Marielle Labèque (pianos), Sylvio Gualda (percussion) Erato Records, 1973
- L'empreinte digitale ED 13043: "Autres contacts", Adama Dramé and Les Percussions de Strasbourg (Modibo Salifou, solo by Adama Dramé; Other contacts, Jean-Pierre Drouet, State commission; Percussions pour Mandela, Adama Dramé; Final, les Percussions de Strasbourg)
- Discography (Discogs)
