= Sachin: The Ultimate Winner =

- Directed by: Dweep Raj Kochhar
- Screenplay by: Dweep Raj Kochhar, Dhruv Raj, Yuvraj Kochhar
- Story by: Dweep Raj Kochhar
- Produced by: Dweep Raj Kochhar
- Cinematography: Gagarin Misshr
- Edited by: Kunal Prabhu
- Music by: Yuvraj Kochhar and Harish Mangoli
- Production company: J.S.R. Productions Pvt. Ltd.
- Release date: 13 January 2023
- Country: India
- Language: Hindi

Sachin: The Ultimate Winner is a Hindi film starring Ved Thapar, Shivani Sharma and Dhruv Raj. The film is written, directed, and produced by Dweep Raj Kochhar. Actor Ved Thapar, who was seen in the role of Raja in the television serial Raja Aur Rancho, plays Sachin's coach.

== Summary ==
Sachin in a kid who wants to become a cricketer like his namesake Sachin Tendulkar. When a crash leaves him paralyzed, he is encouraged by his coach and classmates to come back.

== Cast ==
- Mukul Cheeru as Sachin
- Dr. Ved Thapar as Sachin's coach
- Shivani Sharma as Sachin's mother
- Dhruv Raj as the opponent's coach
- Dweep Raj Kochhar as Nihaal Singh, Sachin's milkman
- Muskan Panwar as Sachin's sister
- Naved Sharma as the opponent team captain
- Armandeep Singh as classmate of Sachin
