= Jean Facchinetti =

Swiss footballer

Personal information
- Date of birth: 26 January 1904
- Date of death: 4 February 1965 (aged 61)
- Position: Defender

International career
| Years | Team | Apps | (Gls) |
| 1928 | Switzerland | 1 | (0) |

Jean Facchinetti (26 January 1904 – 4 February 1965) was a Swiss footballer.

== Career ==
He played in one match for the Switzerland national football team in 1928. He was also part of Switzerland's squad for the football tournament at the 1928 Summer Olympics, but he did not play in any matches.
