= Francesco Angelo Facchini =

Italian naturalist

Francesco Angelo Facchini (October 24, 1788 – October 6, 1852) was an Italian naturalist and doctor.

== Biography ==
Facchini was born in 1788 in Forno (present-day Moena) to Domenico and Margherita Degaudenz. He obtained a medical degree in 1815. In his medical career, he supported the use of bloodletting and dieting to manage medical conditions. He also studied the natural sciences, and became involved in botany and geology, specifically studying the geology and flora of the Fassa and Fiemme valleys. He died in 1852 of stomach cancer in Trento.
