= Adriano Facchini =

Adriano Facchini may refer to:

- Adriano Facchini (pentathlete) (1927–1969), Italian modern pentathlete
- Adriano Facchini (footballer) (born 1983), Brazilian footballer
