= Sachin INA =

- city
- Location in Gujarat, India Sachin INA (India)
- Coordinates: 21.09°N 72.85°E
- Country: India
- State: Gujarat
- District: Surat

Population (2001)
  - Total: 3,293

Languages
  - Official: Gujarati, Hindi
- Time zone: UTC+5:30 (IST)
- Vehicle registration: GJ
- Website: gujaratindia.com

Sachin INA is a town and an industrial notified area in Surat district in the Indian state of Gujarat.

== Demographics ==
As of the 2011 India census, Sachin INA had a population of 13,293. Males constitute 86% of the population and females 14%. Sachin INA has an average literacy rate of 79%, higher than the national average of 59.5%; male literacy is 84%, and female literacy is 45%. In Sachin INA, 6% of the population is under 6 years of age.

== See also ==
- List of tourist attractions in Surat
