= Mickaël Facchinetti =

Swiss footballer (born 1991)

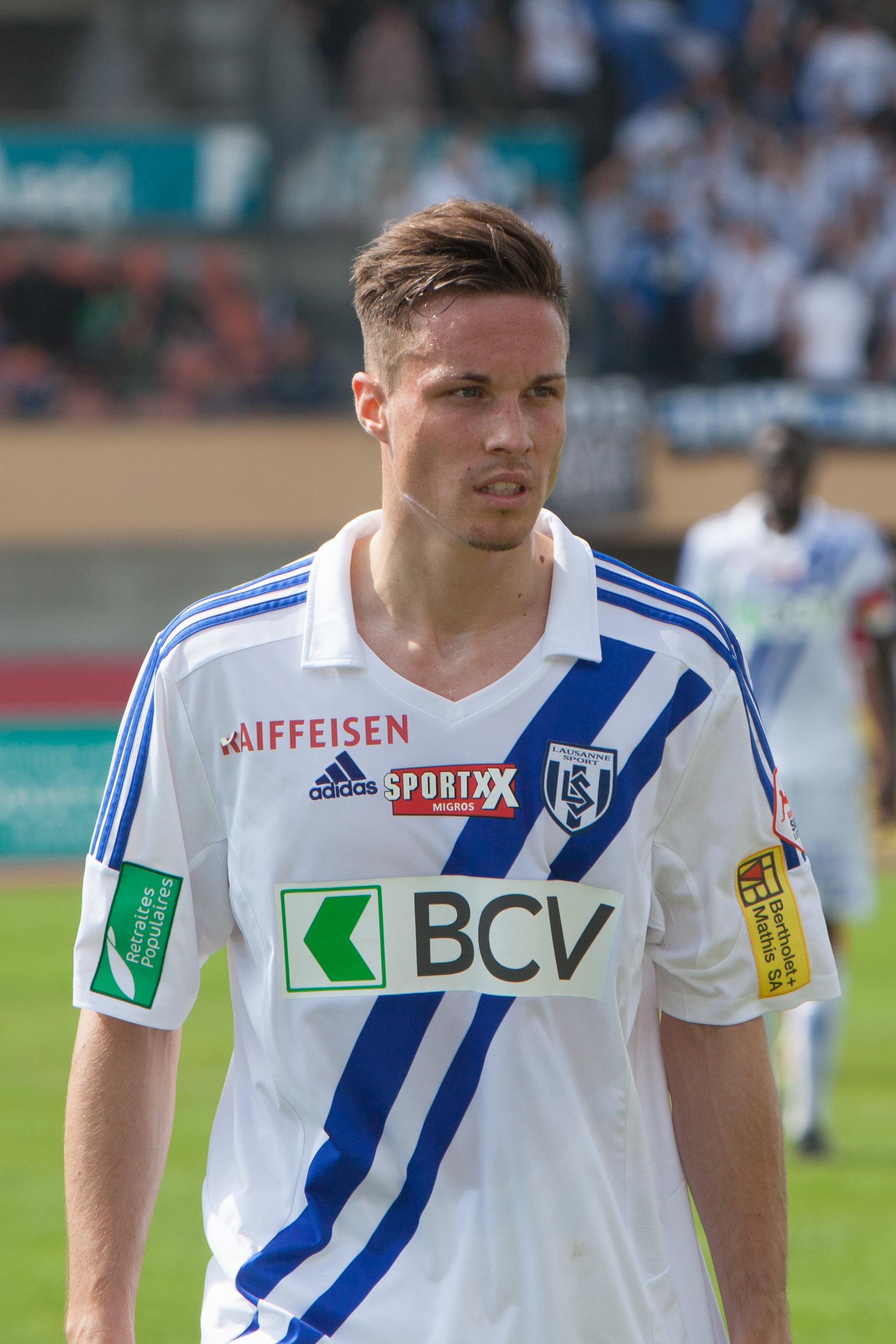

Personal information
- Date of birth: 15 February 1991 (age 35)
- Place of birth: Neuchâtel, Switzerland
- Height: 1.83 m (6 ft 0 in)
- Position: Left-back

Team information
- Current team: Neuchâtel Xamax
- Number: 7

Youth career
- –2008: Team Vaud U21
- 2008–2011: Neuchâtel Xamax

Senior career*
Years	Team	Apps	(Gls)
2008–2012	Neuchâtel Xamax	45	(0)
2012	Lugano	0	(0)
2012	→ Chievo (loan)	0	(0)
2012–2014	Lausanne-Sport	64	(0)
2014–2016	St. Gallen	35	(0)
2016	Neuchâtel Xamax	14	(0)
2016–2019	Thun	42	(1)
2019	APOEL	4	(0)
2019–2020	Sion	15	(1)
2020–2023	Lugano	59	(2)
2024	Paradiso	12	(0)
2025–	Neuchâtel Xamax	37	(0)

International career
2009–2012	Switzerland U20	10	(1)
2012–	Switzerland U21	1	(0)
- * Club domestic league appearances and goals as of 28 September 2026

Mickaël Facchinetti (born 15 February 1991) is a Swiss professional footballer who plays for Challenge League club Neuchâtel Xamax. Facchinetti primarily plays as a left back, but has been known to play at left midfield and centre back.

== Career ==
=== Club ===
Facchinetti made his professional debut for Neuchâtel Xamax on 30 May 2009, when he was substituted on by coach Jean-Michel Aeby in the last game of the 2008/09 season against Lucerne. It was not until the 2010/2011 season when he would become a regular starter. It was during this season that he appeared in the 2011 Swiss Cup final, in which Xamax lost to FC Sion.

After the club were made bankrupt and removed from the Super League, he transferred to FC Lugano in 2012 but after not receiving any game time, he spent half a season at Chievo Verona on loan. However he would also not make any appearances for the Italian club. He transferred to Super League at Lausanne Sport, playing regularly when the team were relegated at the end of the 2013/14 season. After relegation with Lausanne, Facchinetti moved to FC St. Gallen for the 2014/15 season. Facchinetti would become a journeyman player over the next five years playing for five different clubs including returning to Xamax and playing in Cyprus with APOEL Nicosia.

Facchinetti was released by FC Sion at the start of the 2020/21 season when the club could not afford to pay his full salary during the coronavirus-enforced stoppage of football. He was picked up on a free transfer by previous club FC Lugano.

=== National team ===
Facchinetti represented Switzerland at U20 and U21 level. His first U20 game was against Germany which the Swiss lost 2-0 on 7 October 2010. His sole international goal was against the Italian U20 team in a 3-2 victory on 31 August 2011.

== Personal life ==
When Facchinetti was 18, his mother committed suicide and he had to take care of his siblings. He is of Italian descent, and of German descent through his grandmother. Facchinetti is a grandson of long-time President of Neuchâtel Xamax Gilbert Facchinetti.

== Honours ==
APOEL

- Cypriot First Division: 2018–19

Lugano

- Swiss Cup: 2021–22
