= Sachin (given name) =

Sachin is a masculine given name common in South Asia. It is derived, via Indic languages like Bengali and Marathi, from the Sanskrit name Shachindra. Shachindra is a name given to Hindu god Indra which means Shachi's Indra. It is also a name of Hindu god Shiva. The literal meaning can be roughly translated into English as "the essence".

== People with the name ==
- Sachin (actor) (Sachin Pilgaonkar) (born 1957), Indian Bollywood actor
- Sachin Ahir (born 1972), Indian politician
- Sachin Baby (born 1988), Indian cricketer
- Sachin Bhowmick (1930–2011), Indian Hindi film writer and director
- Sachin Dev Burman (1906–1975), Indian music composer, singer
- Sachin Chaudhary (born 1983), Indian powerlifter
- Sachin Gupta (born 1978), Indian playwright and theatre director
- Sachin Gupta (musician) (born 1981), Indian music director, composer, guitar player, record producer and singer
- Sachin H. Jain (born 1980), American physician and health policy analyst
- Sachin Khedekar (born 1965), Indian actor and director
- Sachin Kundalkar, Indian film director and screenwriter
- Sachin Lawande, Indian American businessman
- Sachin Mylavarapu (born 1991), Singaporean cricketer
- Sachin Nag (1920–1987), Indian swimmer
- Sachin Nair (born 1978), Indian cricketer
- Sachin Nayak (born 1982), Indian actor
- Sachin Patel (born 1979), Indian cricketer
- Sachin Pilot (born 1977), Indian politician
- Sachin Puthran, Indian entrepreneur
- Sachin Rana (born 1984), Indian cricketer
- Sachin Sengupta (1891–1961), Bengali playwright and theatre producer
- Sachin Shroff (born 1972), Indian businessman and TV personality
- Sachin Singh (born 1967), Nepali musician
- Sachin Tendulkar (born 1973), Indian cricketer
- Sachin Waze (born 1972), Indian police officer
- Sachin Yardi, Indian film director and screenwriter
- Sachin Mishra(born 1993), Head of editorial selection The Ceo Magazine

== See also ==
- Sachin (disambiguation)
