= Brigitte Lefèvre =

French ballet dancer, choreographer and teacher

Brigitte Lefèvre (born 15 November 1944) is a French ballet dancer, choreographer and teacher. She was director of the Paris Opera Ballet from 1995 to 2014.

== Early life and education ==
Lefèvre attended the Paris Opera Ballet School from the age of eight and joined the corps de ballet in 1961 when she was 16. She danced not only in the great classical ballets but also in the more recent works of George Balanchine, Roland Petit, Maurice Béjart and Gene Kelly. In addition to training under the Opera's clacissists such as Yvette Chauviré, she attended courses with American choreographers including Alwin Nikolais, Merce Cunningham and Paul Taylor.

== Career ==
In 1970, Lefèvre choreographed Mikrokosmos to the music of Bartók for the Avignon Festival before devoting more time to musicals and the theatre. In 1972, she left the Opéra to found her own dance company, the Théâtre du Silence, at La Rochelle where she remained until 1985. In 1985, she was appointed Principal Inspector of Dance at the French Ministry of Culture where from 1987 she became Inspector General and Principal Dance Delegate.

In 1992, she returned to the Opéra Garnier as Administrator General before becoming associate director, Head of Dance, in 1994. In July 1995, she was appointed Director of Dance at the Paris Opera, a position she held until October 2014 when she was succeeded by Benjamin Millepied. During her long tenure, she opened up the ballet to the major contemporary choreographers who created new works for the company.

== Other responsibilities ==
Lefèvre also serves as vice-president of the Paris Conservatory. Since 1998, she has been an administrator at Société Radio France and in 2013 was elected president of the Orchestre de chambre de Paris. She has been a board member of the Conseil Supérieur de l'Audiovisuel since 2013, in charge of foreign broadcasting.

== Decorations ==
Lefévre is a commandeur of the Ordre national du Mérite, of the Légion d'honneur and of the Ordre des Arts et des Lettres.
