= Giandomenico Facchina =

19th-century Italian mosaic artist

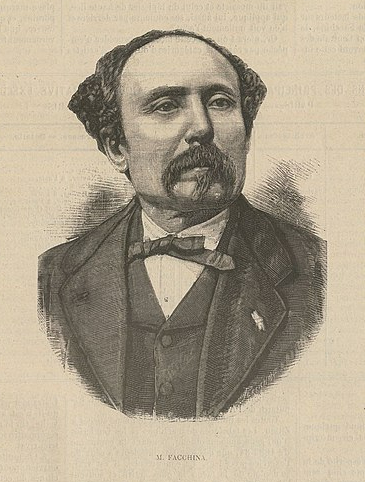
- Giandomenico Facchina, by Georges-Léon-Alfred Perrichon (c.1884)
- Born: 13 October 1826; Sequals, Friuli-Venezia Giulia, Italy
- Died: 26 April 1903 (aged 76); Paris
- Occupation: Mosaic artist

Giandomenico Facchina (1826–1903) was an Italian mosaic artist.

== Biography ==
Giandomenico Facchina was born in 1826 in Sequals, today in the province of Pordenone in the Friuli Venezia Giulia region, at that time part of the Lombard-Venetian Kingdom.

He was trained in Trieste and Venice. He first worked on the restoration of ancient mosaics, including the St Mark's Basilica in Venice. In the 1850s he traveled to France, first to Montpellier, where he was called to work on the restoration of old floors.

He filed a patent for a method of extracting ancient mosaic pavements at the National Institute of Industrial Property in 1858, reusing a technique already practiced by Venetian mosaic experts. He also used a derivative of this technique, which allows a prefabricated mosaic to be made in the workshop, facilitating production of the mosaic. In this technique, the mosaic tiles are pre-assembled and glued onto a flexible cardboard; the wall to hold the mosaic is then covered with fresh mortar and mosaic installed at once, reducing the working time on site and allowing a considerable reduction of production costs. This technique was used very successful at the Exposition Universelle (1855) in Paris and spread rapidly. It allowed Facchina get many orders. At Paris, he decorated, among others, the new opera house built by Charles Garnier.

Until his death in 1903 Giandomenico Facchina divided his time between his studios in Venice and Paris.

== Main works ==
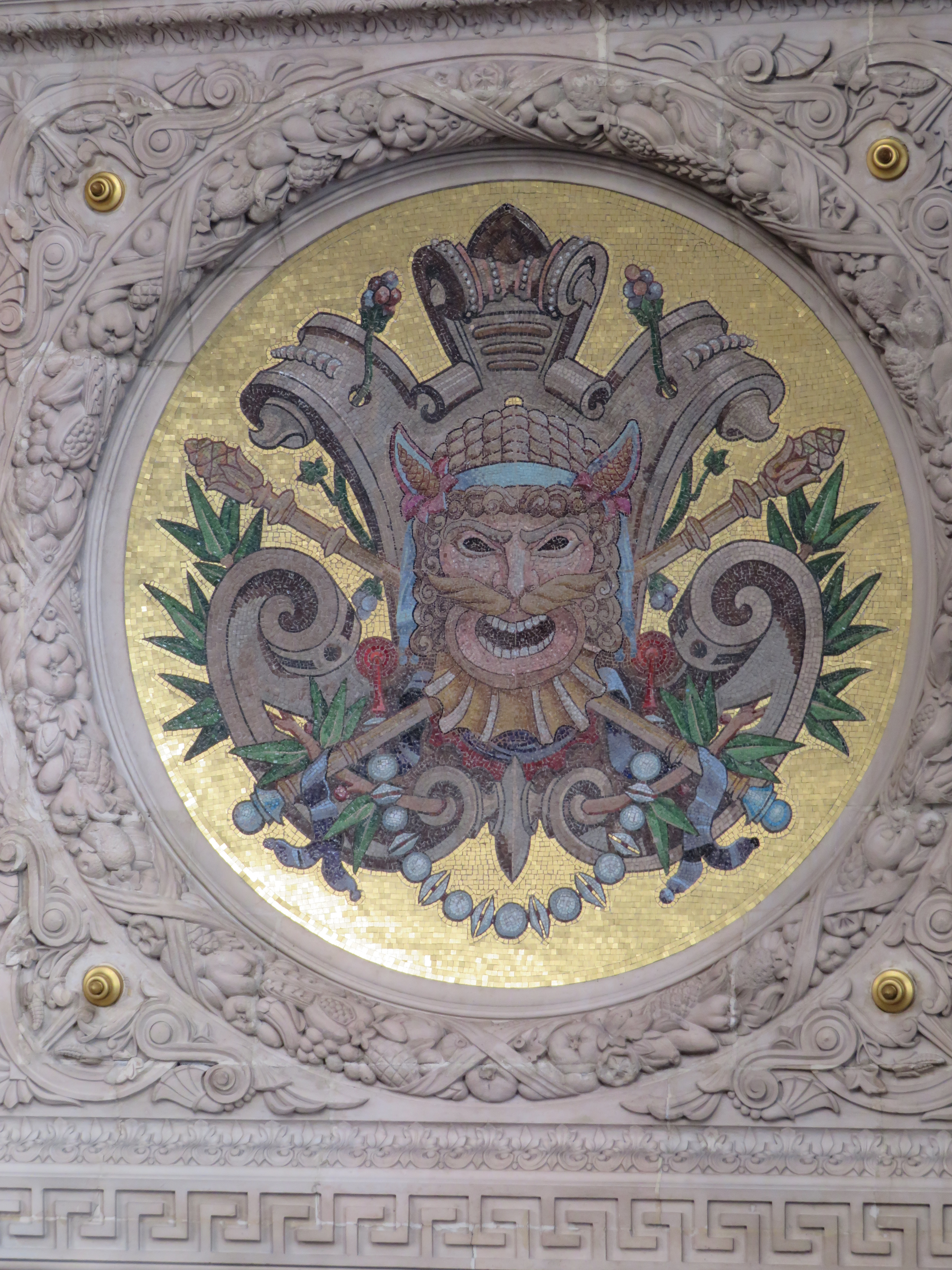
Exterior mosaic at the Opéra Garnier

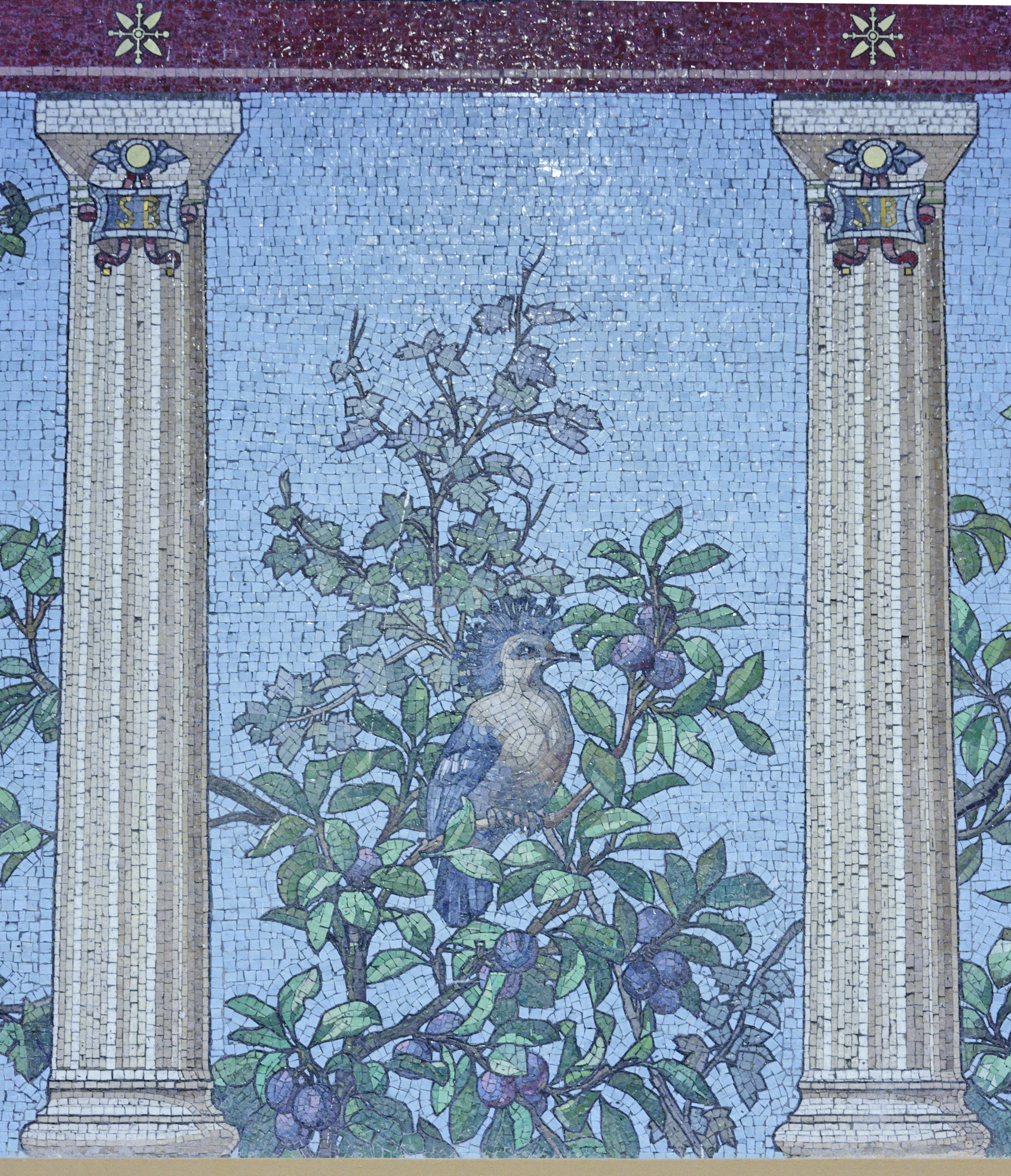
Detail of a mosaic in the refectory of the Bibliothèque Sainte-Barbe

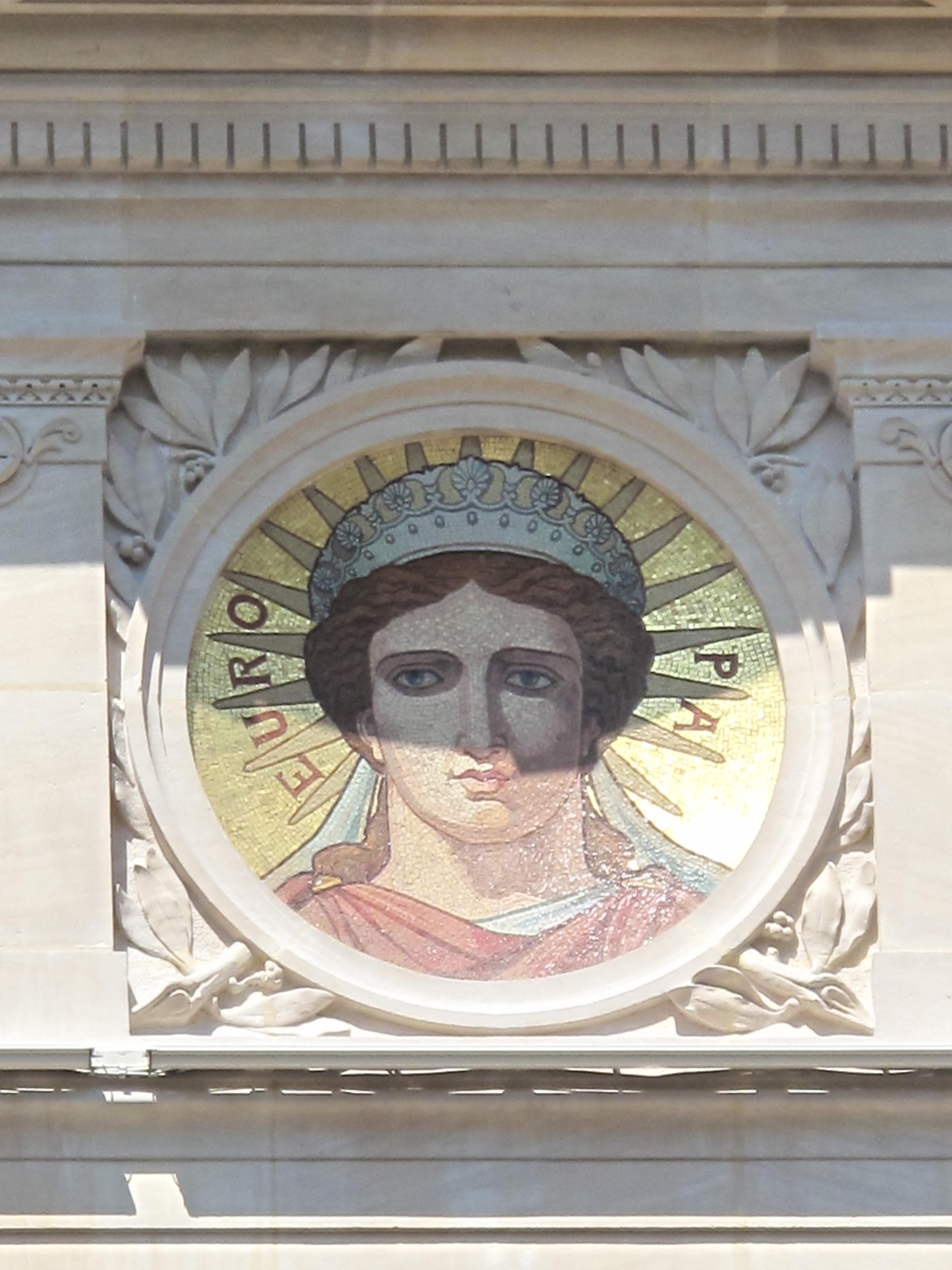
Europa; façade at the Comptoir National d'Escompte de Paris

- Opéra Garnier
- Musée Galliera
- Musée Grévin
- Carnavalet Museum
- Petit Palais
- Printemps Haussmann
- Le Bon Marché
- Galerie Vivienne
- Comptoir national d'escompte de Paris
- Lycée Louis-le-Grand
- Lycée Chaptal
- Collège Sainte-Barbe (now the Bibliothèque Sainte-Barbe)
- Théâtre Antoine
