= Allegory of Spring =

Allegory of Spring, either a title or a description of a painting, may refer to:

- Primavera by Botticelli
- Rêve de printemps by William-Adolphe Bouguereau
- Spring Scattering Stars by Edwin Blashfield
- Allegory of Spring by Nicolaes Pieterszoon Berchem
- The Allegory of Spring by Jan van Beers
- Allégorie du Printemps by Pierre II Mignard
- Le Printemps by Giuseppe Arcimboldo
- Allegorie des Frühlings by Bernhard Rode
- Allegorie van de Lente by Jan Brueghel the Elder
- Allegory of Spring
  - by Henri-Pierre Picou
  - by Henry Ryland
  - by Alexander Bruckmann
  - by Jerzy Siemiginowski-Eleuter
  - by Théodore-Edmond Plumier
  - by Anton Ferdinand Schaller
  - by Lorenzo di Pierfrancesco de' Medici
  - by Pietro Baratta
  - by Jacob Grimmer
  - by Lodewijk Toeput
  - by Salvador Dalí
  - by Hans Bol
  - by Ignazio Stern

== See also ==
- Deities and personifications of seasons
