= Schaller (surname) =

Schaller is a German surname. Notable people with the surname include:

- Albert Schaller (1857–1934), American jurist and politician
- Alexander Schaller (born 2002), German bobsledder
- Anton Schaller (born 1944), Swiss journalist and politician
- Anton Ferdinand Schaller (1773–1844), Austrian painter
- Barry R. Schaller (1938–2017), American lawyer, judge, academic, and bioethicist
- Biff Schaller (1889–1939), American baseball player
- Chris Schaller (1935–1984), American journalist and editor
- Christian Schaller, German theologian
- Curt O. Schaller (born 1964), German cinematographer, steadicam operator, photographer, inventor and Oscar & Emmy winner
- François Schaller (1928–2006), Swiss economist
- Gábor Schaller (born 1966), Hungarian equestrian
- George Schaller (born 1933), American biologist
- Gerd Schaller (born 1965), German conductor
- Gilbert Schaller (born 1969), Austrian tennis player
- Hans Schaller, German luger
- Hans-Peter Schaller (born 1963), Austrian football manager
- Johann Gottlieb Schaller (1734–1814), German zoologist and entomologist
- Johann Nepomuk Schaller (1777–1842), Viennese professor and sculptor
- Johanna Schaller-Klier (born 1952), German Olympic hurdler
- John Schaller (1912–1978), American politician
- József Schaller (1894–1927), Hungarian footballer
- Julius Schaller (1810–1868), German philosopher
- Käte Schaller-Härlin (1877–1973), German painter
- Laso Schaller (born 1988), Brazilian-Swiss athlete
- Lyle E. Schaller (1923–2015), Church consultant and author
- Mark Schaller, American psychologist
- Michel Schaller (born 1969), French table tennis player
- Nicole Schaller (born 1993), Swiss badminton player
- Oliver Schaller (born 1994), Swiss badminton player
- Petra Schmidt-Schaller (born 1980), German actress
- Rainer Schaller (born 1969), German entrepreneur
- René Schaller (1915–?), Swiss footballer
- Simone Schaller (1912–2016), American hurdler
- Sophia Schaller (born 2000), Austrian figure skater
- Thomas Schaller (born 1967), American political scientist
- Tim Schaller (born 1990), American ice hockey player
- Tony Schaller, Belgian writer
- Willy Schaller (1933–2015), American soccer player
