= Fontana dei Dioscuri =

Fountain in Rome, Italy

- Fountain
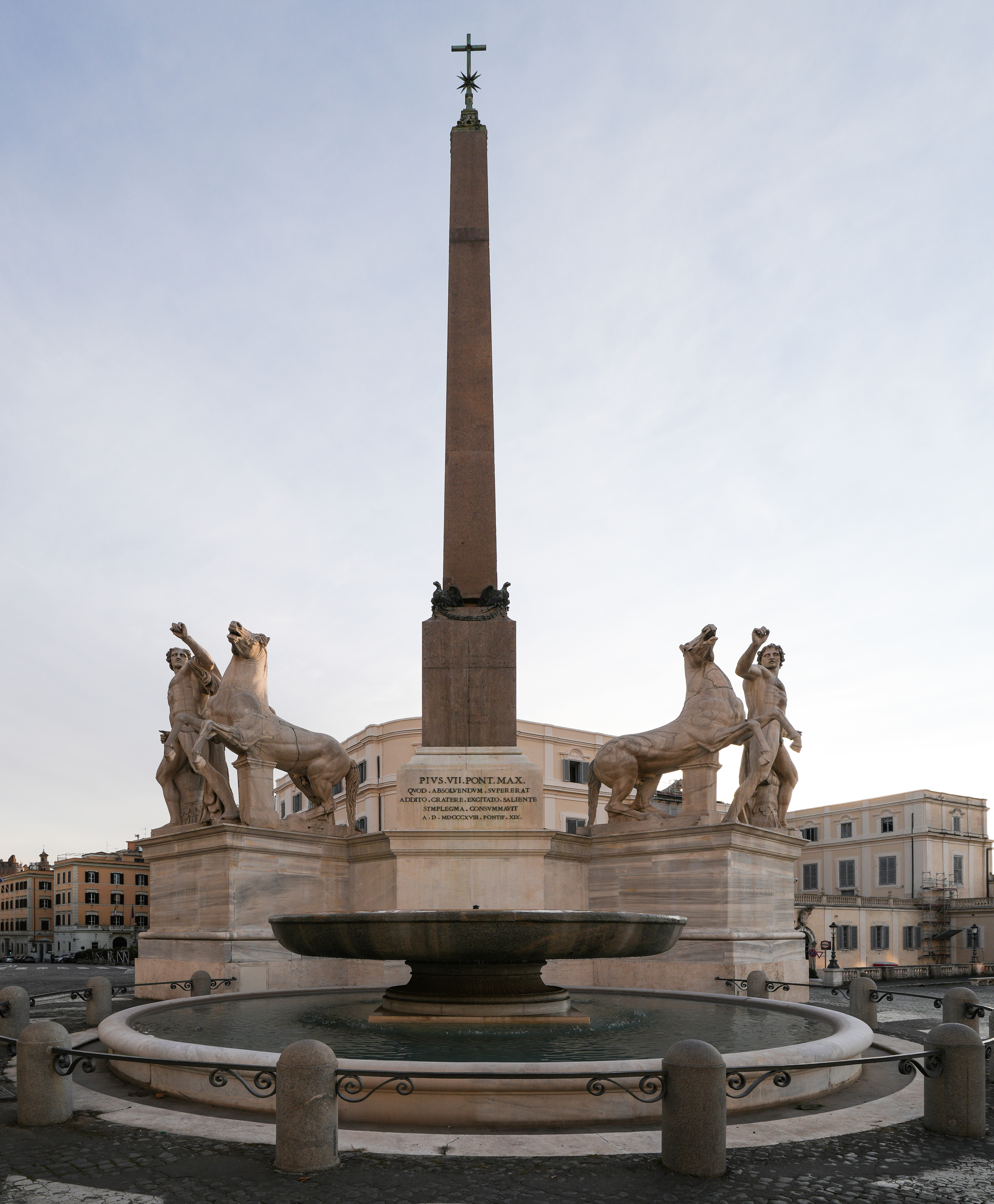
- Fontana dei Dioscuri
- Design: Raffaele Stern
- Location: Piazza del Quirinale, Rome, Italy
- Interactive map of Fontana dei Dioscuri
- Coordinates: 41°53′57″N 12°29′12″E

The Fontana dei Dioscuri is the fountain set opposite the Palazzo del Quirinale, the official residence of the President of the Italian Republic in the Quirinal Palace.

The original fountain, which no longer exists, commissioned by Pope Sixtus V in 1588, had the famous antique Horse Tamers (Dioscuri, Castor and Pollux) statues, from Constantine I of Rome's Baths, moved to the piazza, from the site, thought to have been nearby, flanking it.

In the late 1780s by Antinori, was commissioned by Pope Pius VI, to make a better layout for the piazza and had the fountain and the Dioscuri moved, and included the large Obelisk which had been moved from the Campus Martius in the design.

Some time between, that original fountain was lost, and, in 1818 a new one, which can be seen today, was commissioned by Pope Pius VII and was designed by Raffaele Stern using an ancient granite Roman shell that had been found in the 16th century supported on top of a large basin. It was sited in front of the two statues with the obelisk between them.

In 1810, the Rome-based sculptor Paolo Triscornia sent the reduced copies of the Dioscuri to Saint Petersburg for his compatriot Giacomo Quarenghi. They were put up in front of the Saint Petersburg Manege six years later.

== See also ==
- List of fountains in Rome
- List of obelisks in Rome
