= Schaller =

Schaller may refer to:

- Schaller (surname)
- Sallet (Schaller), a German-style Renaissance helmet
- Schaller, Iowa, a small town in the United States
- Schaller Electronic GmbH, a German manufacturer of musical components

== See also ==
- Justice Schaller (disambiguation)
