= Horse Tamers =

Colossal pair of marble statues at the Baths of Constantine in Rome

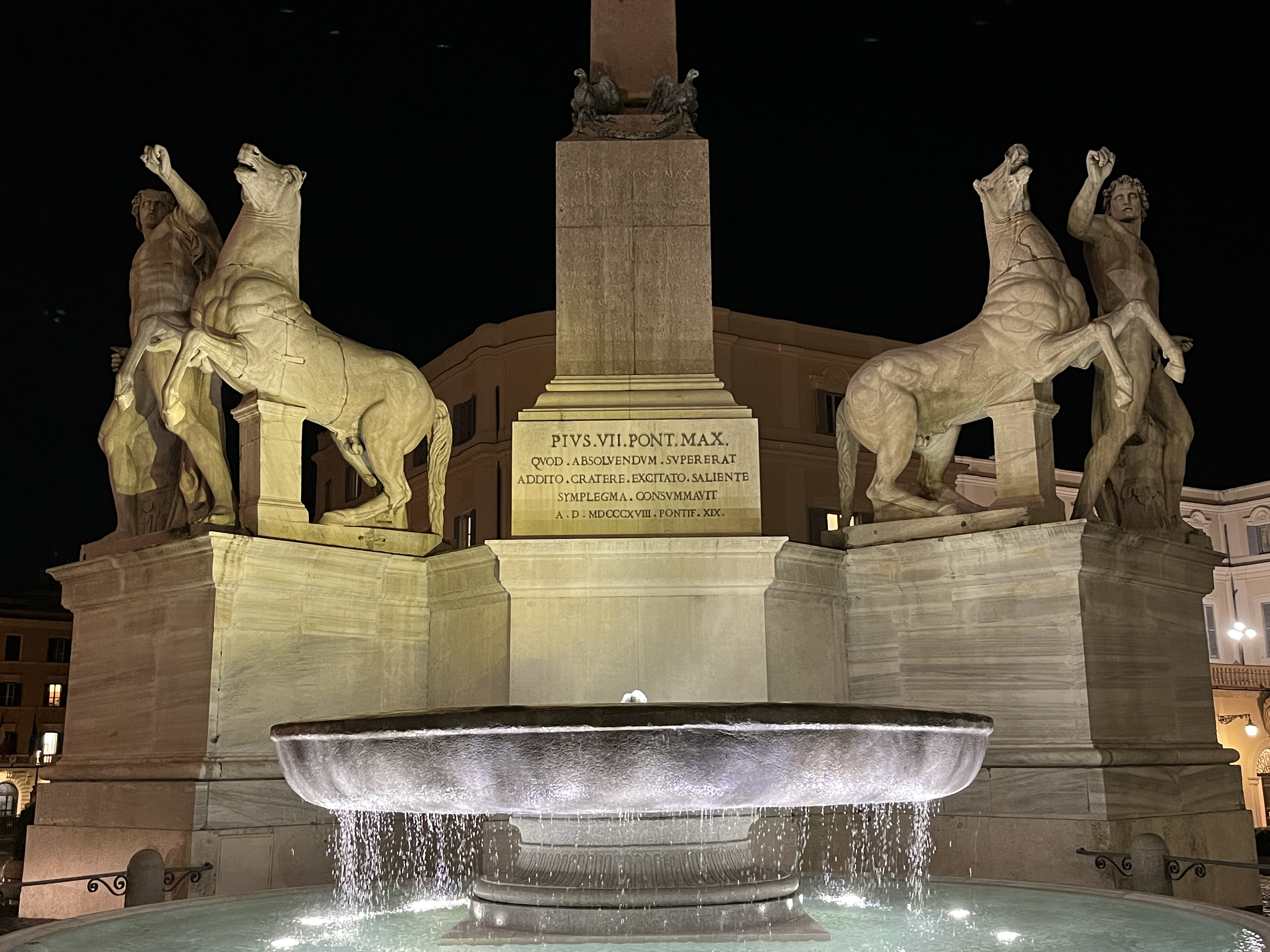

"Horse Tamers" (Colossi of the Dioscuri) are the colossal pair of marble statues, Roman copies of Greek Classical originals from 4th century BC. Now they stood in the Fontana dei Dioscuri at Piazza del Quirinale in Rome. In the Middle Ages the Quirinal hill was called Monte Cavallo after these statues.

Other famous antique statues of same persons in Rome are Capitoline Dioscuri (Dioscuri del Campidoglio) positioned at the top of the Cordonata staircase, leading to Piazza del Campidoglio.

== Subject ==
The Horse Tamers are among the best-preserved colossal sculptures surviving from the Roman Empire. It consists of two symmetrical statues, each holding the reins of their unruly horse. The marble exhibits superficial damage resulting from centuries of exposure to the elements. They are among the few marble sculptures to have survived the centuries and never been buried until today. Otherwise, they are in excellent condition, but some parts have been replaced. The largest replacement part is the chest and forelegs of one of the horses.

Often identified as Castor and Pollux. Their ruinous bases still bore inscriptions OPUS FIDIÆ and OPUS PRAXITELIS, hopeful attributions that must have dated from Late Antiquity. One inscription was located under the statue holding the reins with its left hand, the other one was located under the other statue.

In the Middle Ages people thought that it is the portraits of two men with such names. The huge sculptures were noted in the medieval guidebook for pilgrims, Mirabilia Urbis Romae. It reported that OPUS FIDIÆ and OPUS PRAXITELIS were "the names of two seers who had arrived in Rome under Tiberius, naked, to tell the 'bare truth' that the princes of the world were like horses which had not yet been mounted by a true king."

An interpretation of their subject as Alexander and Bucephalus was proposed in 1558 by Onofrio Panvinio, who suggested that Constantine had removed them from Alexandria, where they would have referred to the familiar legend of the city's founder. This is a popular alternative to their identification as the Dioscuri. According to a story long repeated by popular guides, they were created by Phidias and Praxiteles competing for fame, despite these two long preceding Alexander.

In the 17th century statues were identified as Dioscuri. The authorship of Phidias and Praxitelis was discarded much later. The artistic style belongs to the school of Phidias and is similar to the sculptures of the Parthenon. The statues were identified as Roman copies of Greek originals of unknown authorship. Stephen Geppert thinks that it is the Antonine period work. Now statues' creation is associated with the Baths of Constantine, a Constantinian nymphaeum, or the large Severan temple complex on the Quirinal hill.

== History ==
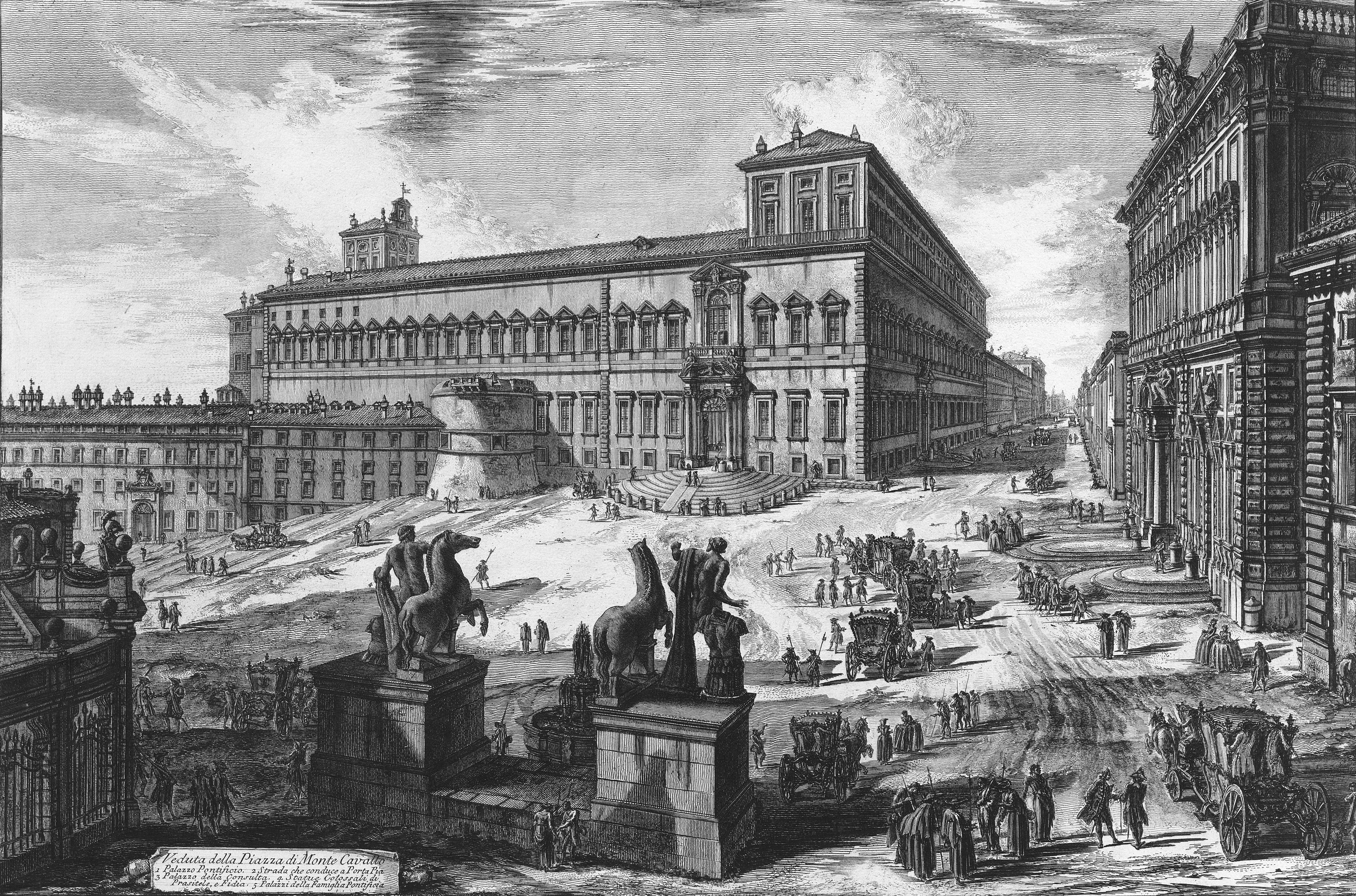
A mid-18th century etching of the Palazzo del Quirinale by Giovanni Battista Piranesi: the colossal "Horse Tamers" are shadowed in the foreground, but the obelisk from the Mausoleum of Augustus (erected 1783–1786) has not yet been set up between them.

The earliest reference dates back to the 10th century, when this work of art was referred to as "marble horses" (cavalli marmorei).

Statues have stood on a huge marble pedestal since antiquity near the site of the Baths of Constantine on the Quirinal Hill, Rome. They gave to the Quirinal its medieval name Monte Cavallo (Italian for 'Horse Mountain'), which lingered into the 19th century. Their coarseness has been noted, while the vigor—notably that of the horses—has been admired.

Between 1589 and 1591, Sixtus V had them restored and set on new pedestals flanking a fountain (Fontana dei Dioscuri ), another engineering triumph for Domenico Fontana, who had moved and re-erected the obelisk in Piazza San Pietro. The two statues were separated and placed at a greater distance from each other. The inscriptions were also replaced with new ones.

In 1783-86 they were re-set at an angle, and an obelisk, which had recently been found at the Mausoleum of Augustus, was re-erected between them. The present granite basin, which had served for watering cattle in the Roman Forum was set between them in 1818.

Napoleon's agents wanted to include them among the classical booty removed from Rome after the 1797 Treaty of Tolentino, but they were too large to be buried or to be moved very far.

== Influence ==
The Colossi of the Quirinal are the original exponents of this theme of dominating power, which has appealed to powerful patrons since the seventeenth century, from Marly-le-Roi to Saint Petersburg.

About 1560 a second pair of colossal marble figures accompanied by horses were unearthed and set up on either side of the entrance to the Campidoglio.

The fame of the Horse Tamers recommended them for other situations where the ruling of base natures by higher nature was iconographically desirable. The Marly Horses made by Guillaume Coustou the Elder for Louis XV at Marly-le-Roi were re-set triumphantly in Paris at the time of the French Revolution, flanking the entrance to the Champs-Elysées In the 1640s, bronze replicas were to flank the entrance to the Louvre: moulds were taken for the purpose, but the project foundered. Paolo Triscornia carved what seem to have been the first full-scale replicas of the groups for the entrance of the Manège (the riding school of the royal guards) in St. Petersburg" (Haskell and Penny p 139).

The standing of the heroic nudes had risen with the new approach to Antiquity of Neoclassicism: Sir Richard Westmacott was commissioned to cast a full-scale bronze of the "Phidias" figure, supplied with a shield and sword, as a tribute to the Duke of Wellington; it was erected at Hyde Park Corner opposite the Iron Duke's London residence Apsley House, where some French affected to think it was the Duke himself, stark naked. Christian Friedrich Tieck placed copies of the figures, in cast iron, atop Karl Friedrich Schinkel's Altes Museum, Berlin. In St Petersburg, the Anichkov Bridge has four colossal bronze Horse Tamer sculptures by Baron Peter Klodt von Urgensburg (illustration, left). In Brooklyn's Prospect Park, at the Ocean Parkway ("Park Circle") entrance, stands a pair of bronze Horse Tamers sculptures (1899) by Frederick MacMonnies, installed as the newly combined City of New York was spreading across the Long Island landscape.

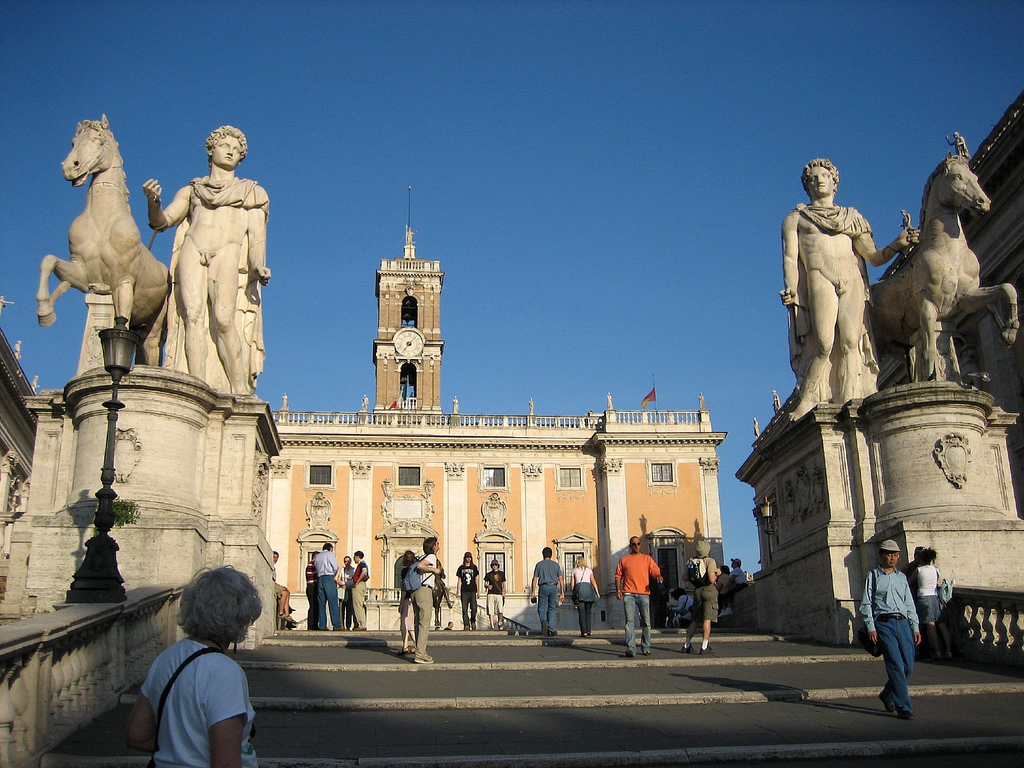
The Capitoline "Horse Tamers"

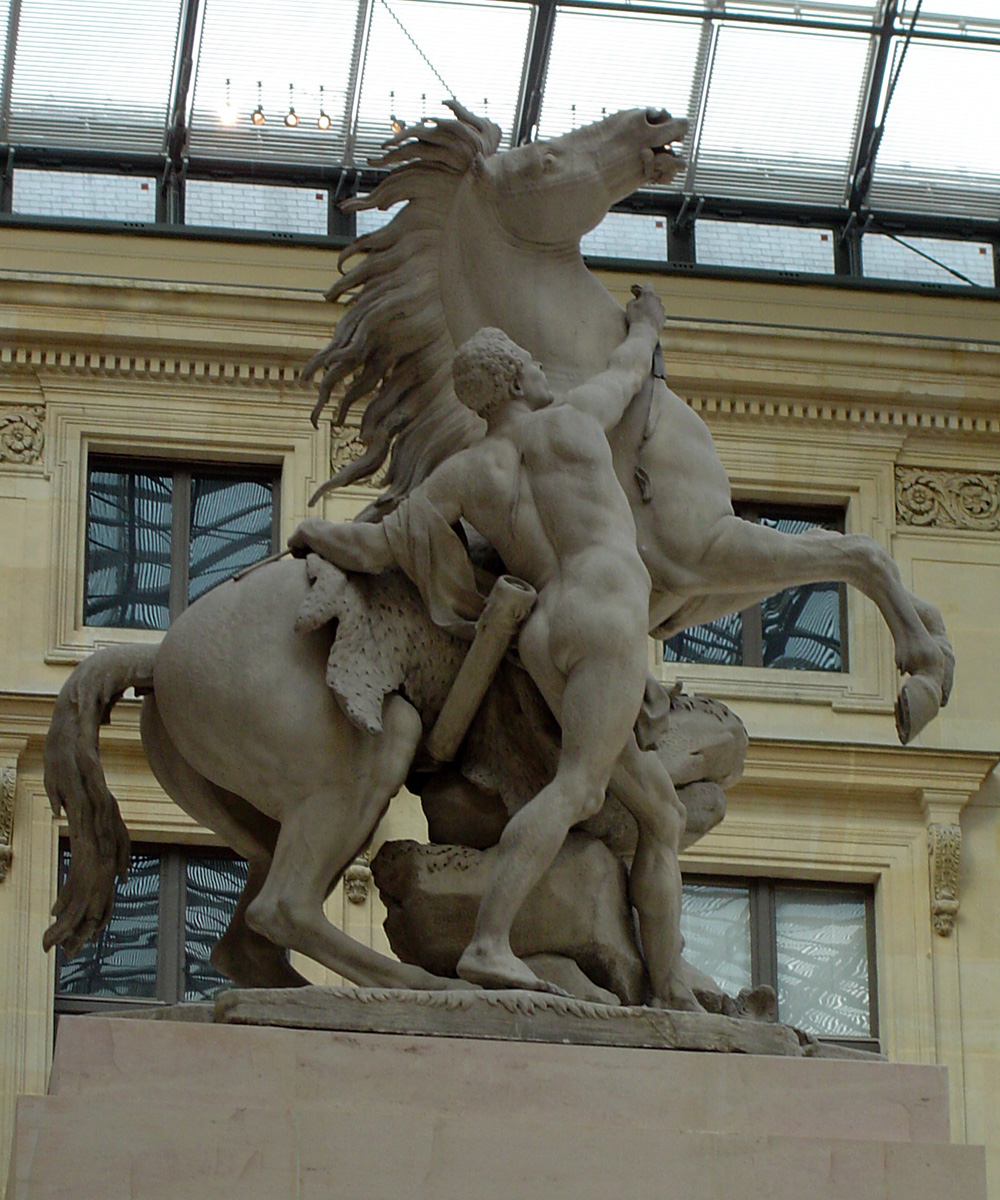
One of the Chevaux de Marly, after the "Horse Tamers"

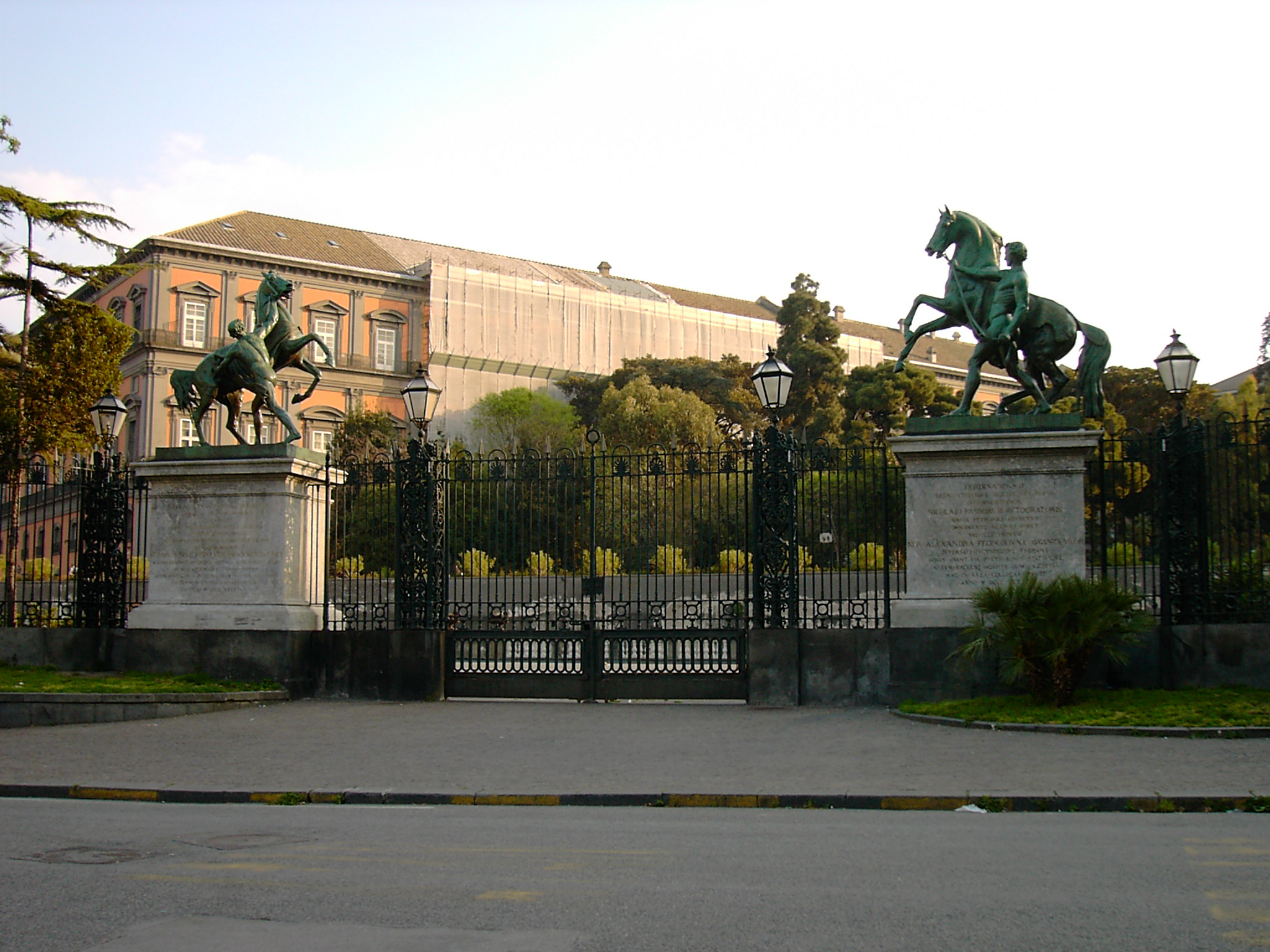
Bronze Horse Tamers, by Baron Peter Klodt von Urgensburg, a gift to Naples from Tsar Nicholas I
