= Palazzo della Consulta =

Late Baroque building in Rome, Italy

- Constitutional Court of the Italian Republic
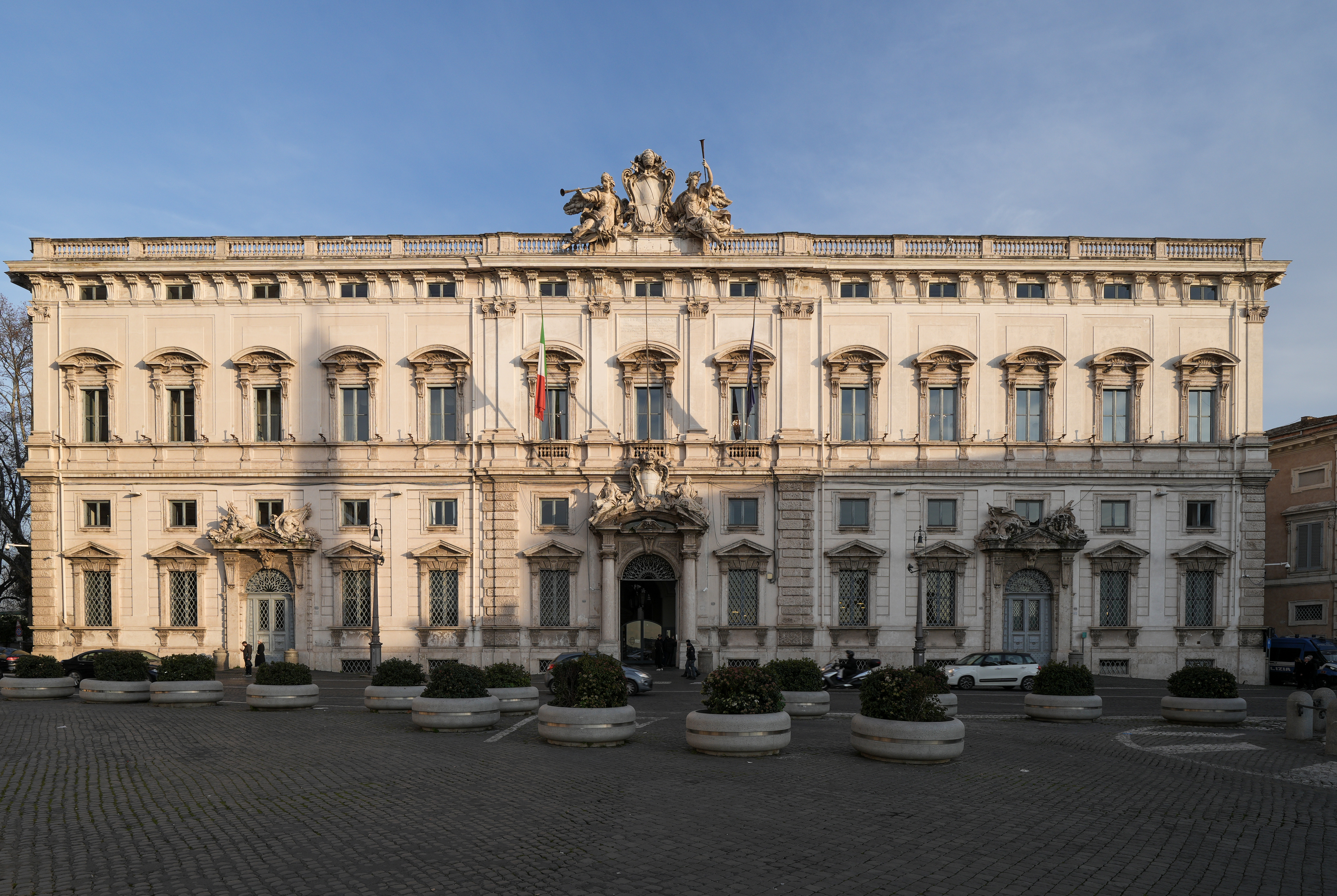
- Seat of the Italian Constitutional Court
- Click on the map for a fullscreen view

General information
- Location: Rome, Italy
- Coordinates: 41°53′56″N 12°29′14″E
- Construction started: 1732
- Completed: 1737
- Client: Pope Clement XII

Design and construction
- Architect: Ferdinando Fuga

The Palazzo della Consulta (built 1732–1737) is a late Baroque palace in central Rome, Italy; since 1955, it houses the Constitutional Court of the Italian Republic. It sits across the Piazza del Quirinale from the official residence of the President of the Italian Republic, the Quirinal Palace.

== History ==
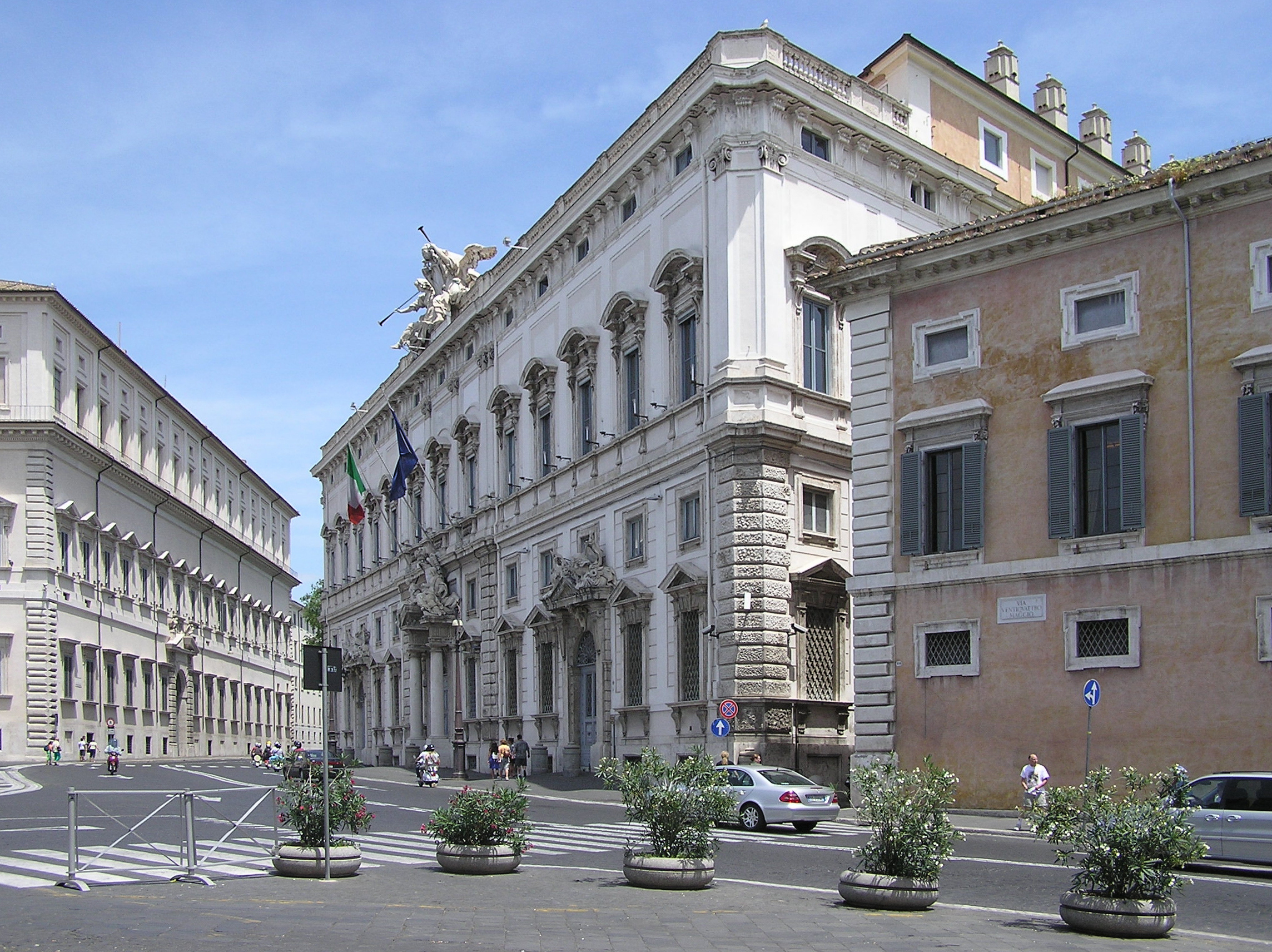
The Constitutional Court of Italy in Palazzo della Consulta is among the Quirinal Hill government buildings in Rome.

Prior to the 17th century, a palace had been erected for the Cardinal Ferrero during the reign of Pope Sixtus V. The Pope Clement XII (Corsini) commissioned the present palace from Ferdinando Fuga, and it was completed in 1737 to house the secretariat of the Sacra Congregazione della Consulta (which served as the main council of state of the Papal states and tribunal) as well as the Segnatura dei Brevi, as well as two corps of Papal Guard units. From 1798 to 1814, the palace was used as the Prefecture of Rome. In 1849, during the Roman Republic, it was the home of the ruling Triumvirate. After the annexation of the Papal States to the Kingdom of Italy, from 1871 to 1874, Prince Umberto I and his wife Margherita of Savoy lived here. From 1874 to 1922, it housed the Ministry of Foreign Affairs, and from 1924 to 1953 it housed the Ministry of Colonies. In 1955, it became the home of the Constitutional Court of Italy.

Fuga ordered the two-storey facade with a piano nobile whose windows have low arched heads set in fielded panels, over a ground floor with low mezzanine. On the lower story the panels have channeled rustication and rusticated quoins at the corners. Pilasters are applied only to the central three-bay block, which barely projects, and to the corners. The roof-line of the facade is topped by a large coat of arms of the Corsini pope, and is similar to the one of Fontana di Trevi. Lower down, at the entrance, a King of Italy installed his coat of arms.

The interiors have undergone a series of fresco decorations over the centuries. The initial 18th-century frescoes by Antonio Bicchierai and Giovanni Domenico Piastrini, are nearly vanished except for a few allegorical figures in the apartments of the Cardinals. In 1787, the new Cardinale dei Brevi, Cardinal Romoaldo Braschi-Onesti, had the palaced redecorated by Bernardino Nocchi, which was also nearly lost except for frescoes on the Myth of Proserpine in the "Salone Pompeiano" and decoration in the ceiling of the "Studio dei Giudici" depicting charity and the four virtues. The Savoy monarchy had frescoed completed by Domenico Bruschi, Cecrope Barilli and Annibale Brugnoli.

Preceded by Palazzo Colonna	Landmarks of Rome; Palazzo della Consulta	Succeeded by Palazzo Farnese
