= Ludovico Stern =

Italian painter (1709–1777)

Ludovico Stern (October 5, 1709 – December 25, 1777) was an Italian painter of the Rococo or late-Baroque period, active in Rome. He is known for both large sacred and history paintings, as well as still lives, and portraits.

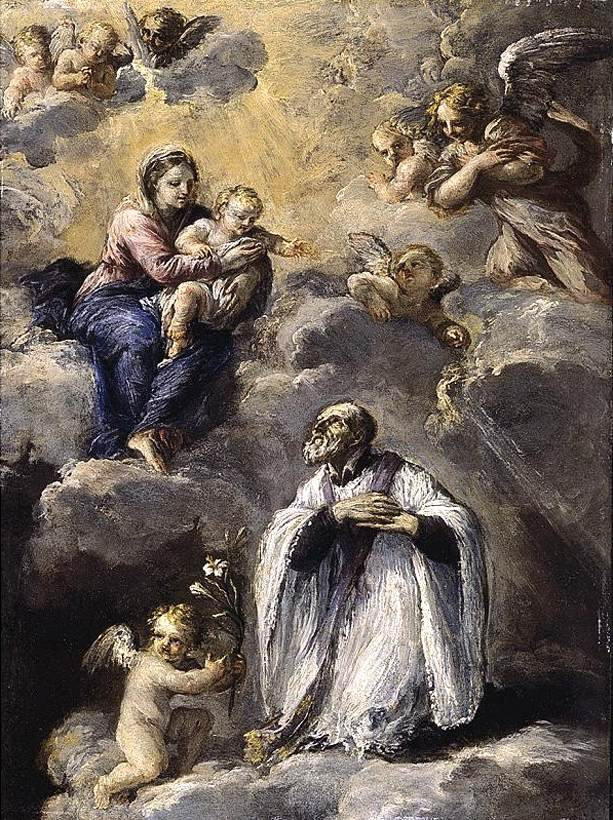
Vision of St Philip Neri.

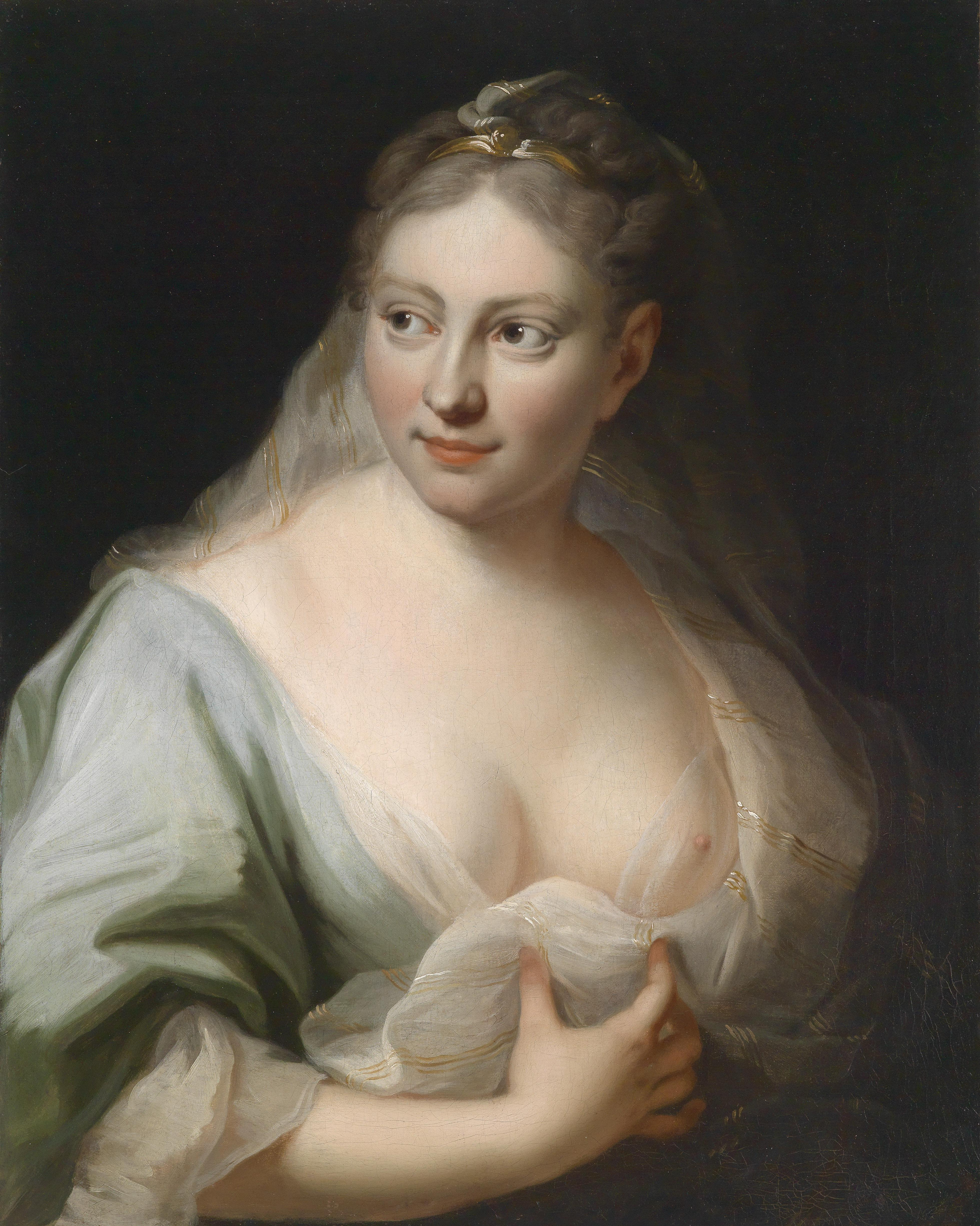
Portrait.

== Biography ==
Stern was born in Rome to a Bavarian painter, Ignazio Stern, (Mariahilf, 1680 – Rome, 1748), who had moved to Italy around the year 1700. Ignazio had received work and training in the studio of Carlo Cignani in Rome. Ignazio had a two sons and two daughters, and all were also allied to the arts. His elder son, of the same name (died 1775) painted still-lives and portraits; a daughter Veronica was a portrait miniaturist, while Maddalena married the French painter Claude Vernet.

Stern initially trained with his father, but also studied later in the Academy of Parma and St Luke in Rome. In 1741, he was inducted into the Congregazione dei Virtuosi del Pantheon, and served as regent from 1755 to 1756. In the latter year, he became an academic of merit at the Accademia di San Luca.

Among his works are two canvases depicting the Extasis and Meditation of San Carlo Borromeo for the chapel of the said saint in Santa Prassede in Rome. He painted a series of religious canvases for the church of San Giovanni Evangelista in Guidonia Montecelio. He painted a San Francesco Caracciolo (1752) for San Lorenzo in Lucina, and a Saints Peter and Paul (1757) for the church of Santi Michele e Magno, and a Vision of St Lawrence of Brindisi (1756), now in the Galleria Nazionale dell’Umbria in Perugia. He also painted a room in the Palazzo Borghese in Rome, now titled the Stanza della Quattro Parti del Mondo (Room of the Four Parts of the World), with a cycle of paintings depicting Europe, America, Asia, Africa, and Juno and Iris.

Stern was also in great demand for his portraits.

Among his ten children, Vicenzo and Martino were painters, while Giovanni was an architect. Giovanni's son, Raffaele Stern (1774-1820) was a prominent neoclassical architect in Rome. Two of Raffele's nephews were also architects.

== Notes ==
A monograph on the painter was completed by Francesco Petrucci and Duccio K. Marignoli: Ludovico Stern (1709-1777): pittura rococò a Roma (Andreina & Valneo Budai, publishers) 2012.
