= Raffaele Stern =

Italian architect (1774–1820)

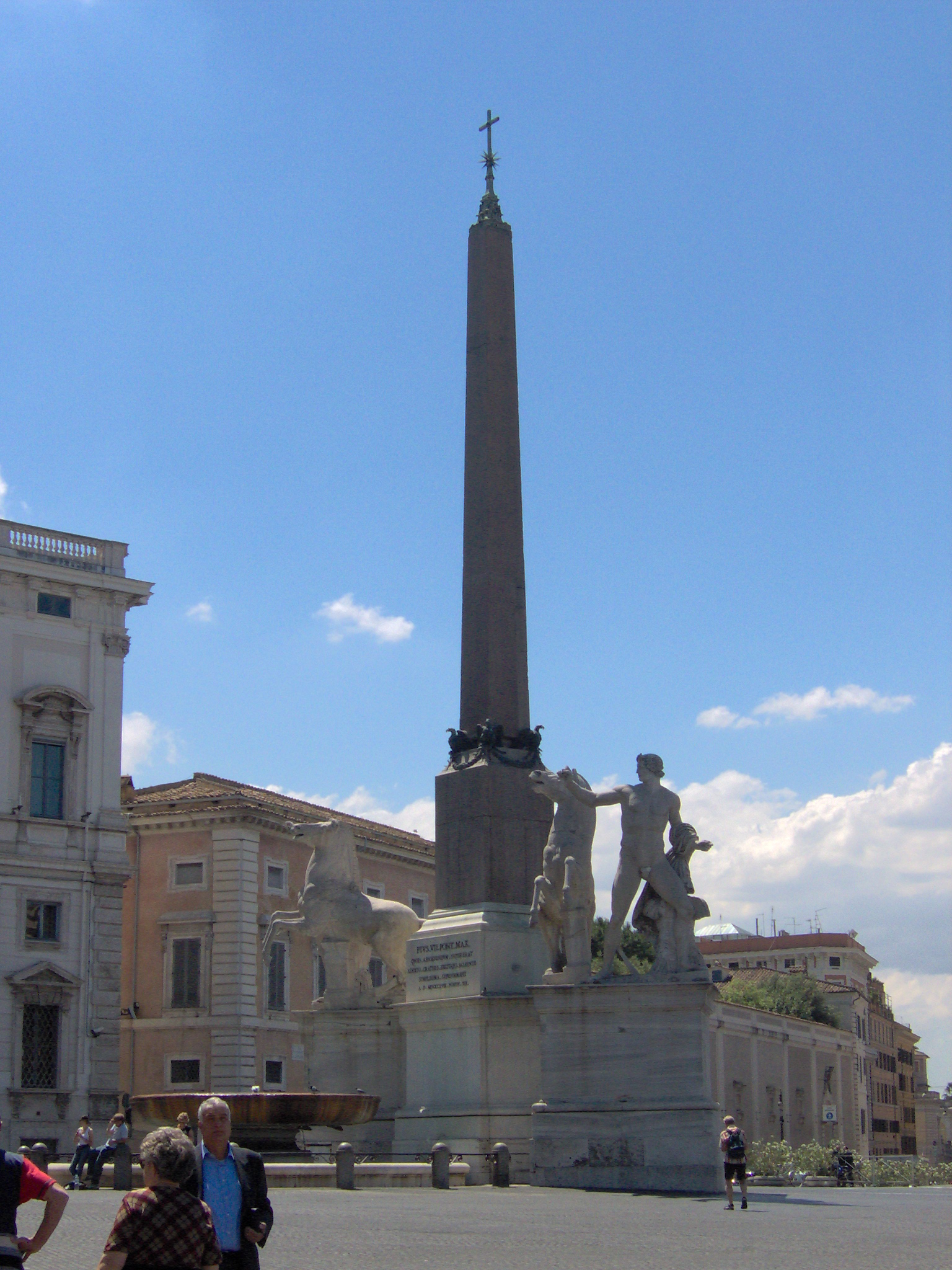
Stern's Fontana dei Dioscuri

Raffaele Stern (13 May 1774 – 30 December 1820) was an Neoclassical Italian architect. He was the great-grandson of the Baroque painter Ludovico Stern.

== Biography ==
=== Early life and education ===
Raffaele Stern was born in 1774 in Rome to Giovanni Stern, an architect. He lived and worked in Rome and followed the principles of Johann Joachim Winckelmann, learnt through his father. These were diluted with a sense of pragmatism which made Raffaele, and to a certain extent Giuseppe Valadier, ideal opponents of the ‘antiquarian’ movement, started and led by the archaeologist Carlo Fea, Commissioner of Roman Antiquities for the papal government.

=== Renovation projects ===
Stern was appointed papal architect by Pius VII and was an honorary scholar of the Accademia di San Luca from 1805. After the Colosseum was damaged by an earthquake in 1806, the Pope appointed a commission for its restoration composed of Stern, the architect Giuseppe Palazzi (1740–1810) and the architect and academic Giuseppe Camporese (1761–1822).

Some work had already been undertaken to prevent further deterioration of the fabric and to remove the minor buildings that had sprung up around the amphitheatre over the centuries, thus beginning a systematic clear-up of the area. The papal commission, led by Stern, after deciding that the unsafe section on the Lateran side should not be knocked down, proposed that a brick buttress be erected. Stern felt that the arches next to the buttress should also be strengthened and proposed a method that stabilized the cracks and the slipping keystones and left stones in distorted positions – in contrast to the antiquarian method and at a much greater expense than that of dismantling and rebuilding the structure. It was therefore a complex operation, the result of a respect for the Antique, the influence that late Mannerism had on him and a pre-Romantic taste for ruins.

Stern’s final report on the work, which was later taken up by Valadier, complains about the lack of commissions for the architects, who for similar work done elsewhere would have received special favours. In 1809 the commission created by the new Napoleonic government of Rome to maintain the city’s monuments entrusted Stern and Valadier with supervising the restoration of the Ponte Milvio, although the approved project was ultimately assigned to Valadier.

In 1810 the sculptor Pietro Finelli (1770–1812) and Jean-Baptiste Wicar accompanied Stern to Florence, where they presented Antonio Canova with the Accademia di San Luca’s title of ‘Principe’. Canova introduced Stern to Elisa Bonaparte, who invited him in Spring 1811 to Emperor Napoleon Bonaparte’s residence in Paris. Here Stern and Canova were appointed to restore the Quirinal Palace, the Pope’s summer palace in Rome. The sculptor Carlo Finelli and Valadier were concurrently working on the building.

Together with Vincenzo Camuccini and Gaspare Landi, Stern and Canova drew up an iconographical programme for the paintings to be executed in the palace. Stern was entrusted with the new State Apartments (intended to host Napoleon between 1811 and 1812), which were decorated by Felice Giani. The work was completed in 1813 and the archaeologist Antonio Nibby pointed out that Stern had made every effort to preserve what he could of the Seicento decoration.

=== Museo Chiaramonti and later works ===
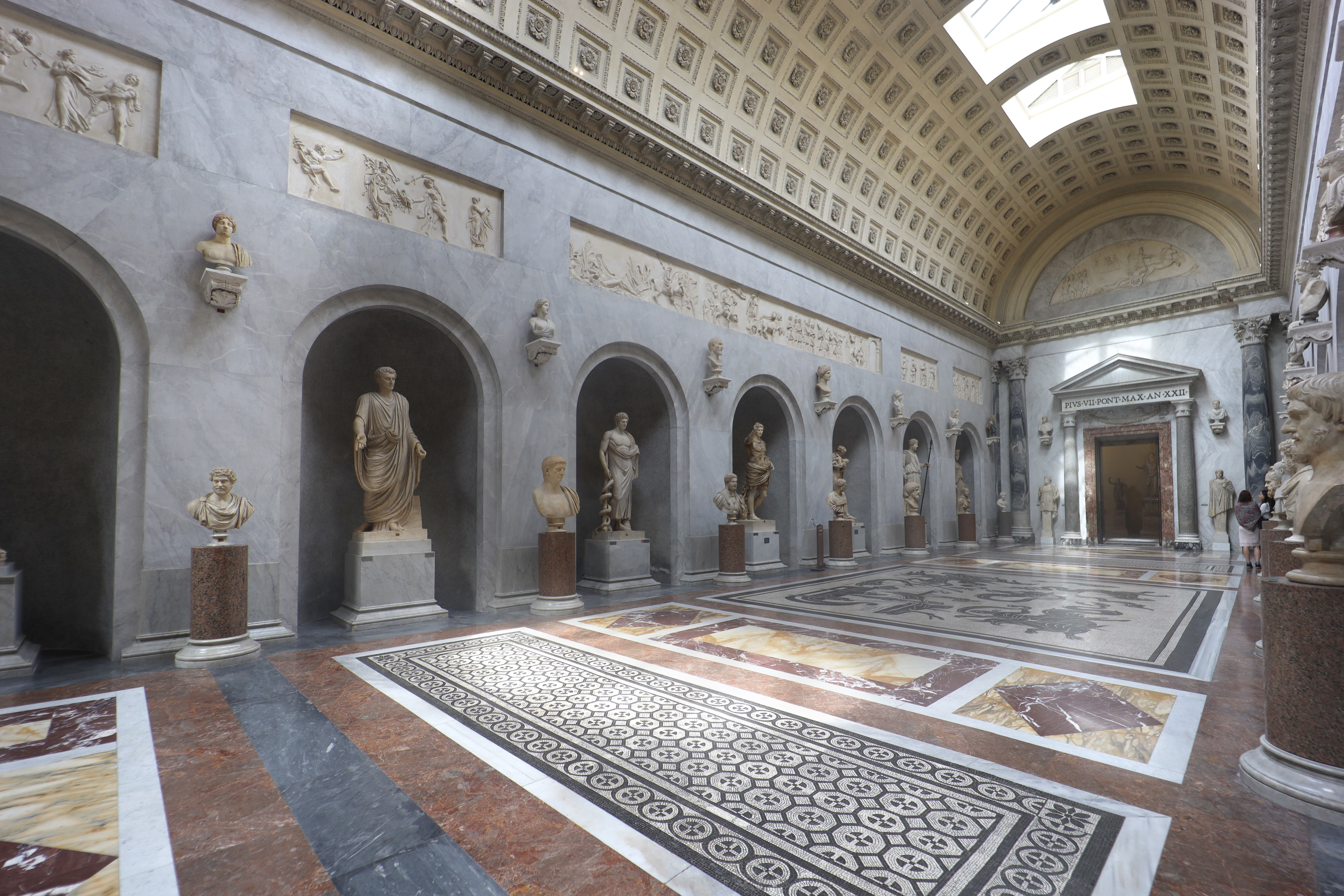
Braccio Nuovo of the Museo Chiaramonti

In 1817 Stern, working for the restored papal government, oversaw the reorganization of the Vatican Museums and began the Braccio Nuovo (‘new wing’) of the Museo Chiaramonti, one of the most authentic expressions of Neoclassical architecture, based on Roman classicism. The work was continued by Pasquale Belli and lasted until 1822. The museum gallery has a vaulted, coffered ceiling interrupted in the middle by a rotunda, lit entirely from above. The space is divided into three large sections by arches supported by polychrome marble columns, creating an effect of proportional harmony with striking perspectives. The side walls contain niches for statues, and the elegant stucco reliefs are by Francesco Massimiliano Laboureur (1767–1831). Stern probably borrowed some of these ideas from the restoration of the Basilica of Maxentius, the various Roman baths and the Temple of Venus and Roma (in Rome), Sant'Andrea in Mantua and, perhaps from the streets of Palmyra, for the busts on the shelves that punctuate the side walls of the gallery.

In 1818 Stern designed the Fontana dei Dioscuri, opposite the Quirinal Palace, and carried out restorations in the Cappella Paolina in the Vatican, demonstrating great technical skill. In 1819 he began the restoration of the Arch of Titus, assisted by Pietro Bosio (fl. 1813–27), who was in Rome as an apprentice. This restoration work (continued by Valadier in 1821) was inspired by the arches of Ancona and Benevento. Unlike Stern’s work on the Colosseum, here antiquarian taste prevailed, in line with the erudite way of reviving antiquity which was typical of architects such as Luigi Canina.

In 1820 Stern decorated the Protomoteca in the Campidoglio, to hold the busts of the Pantheon that were not antique. A few months before his death, which occurred in obscure circumstances, Stern was nominated Vice-President of the Accademia di San Luca. He had taught the theory of architecture there since 1812, but only one volume of his Lezioni di architettura civile was published posthumously in 1822. The book was planned to cover imitation, analogy and symmetry, reflections on orders, distribution, disposition, building materials and techniques and then to demonstrate ‘every type of structure adapted to our uses and customs’. Ireneo Aleandri, Luigi Poletti and Giovanni Azzurri (1792–1855) were all students of Stern, but his ‘utilitarian classicism’ also influenced architects such as Lorenzo Nottolini and Antonio Sarti (1797–1880).

== Bibliography ==
- Catini, Raffaella (2019). "STERN, Raffaele". Dizionario Biografico degli Italiani (in Italian). Vol. 94: Stampa–Tarantelli. Rome: Istituto dell'Enciclopedia Italiana. ISBN 978-88-12-00032-6.
