= Johann Nepomuk Schaller =

Austrian sculptor

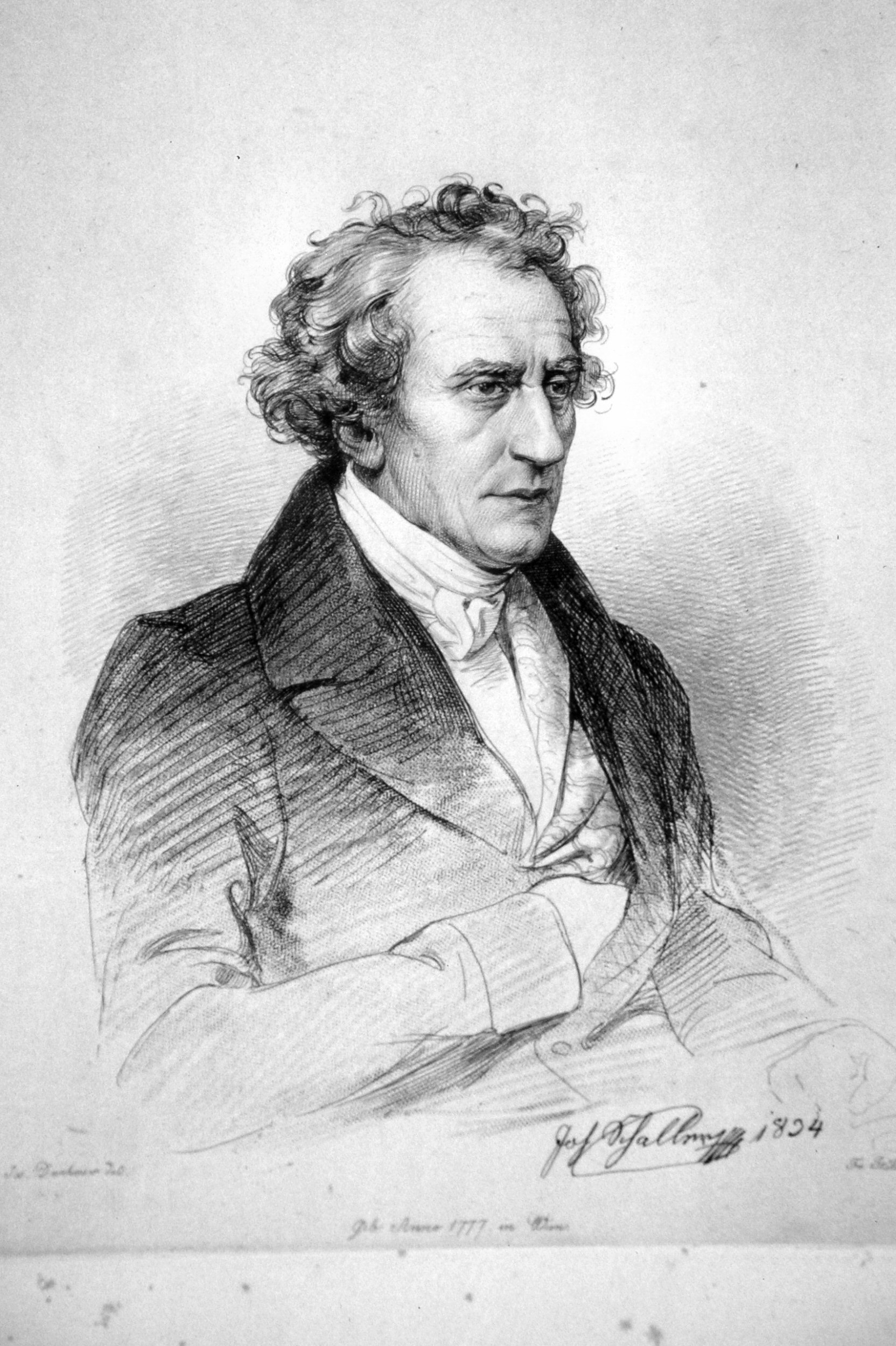
Johann Nepomuk Schaller, engraving by Franz Xaver Stöber (1834)

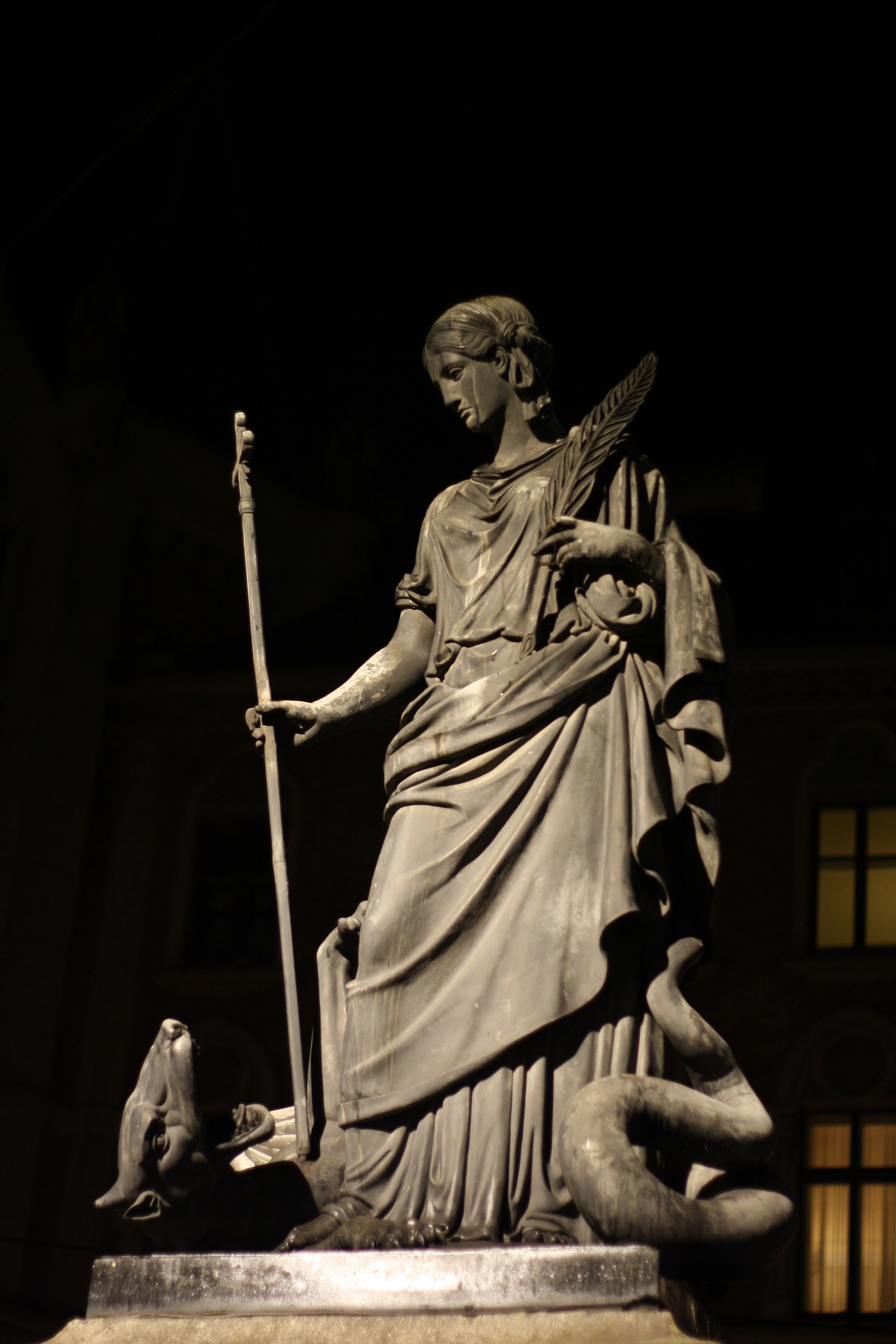
The Margaretenbrunnen at night

Johann Nepomuk Schaller (30 March 1777, Vienna – 16 February 1842, Vienna) was an Austrian sculptor. His most famous work is a bust of Ludwig van Beethoven at age 55, created at the request of the composer's secretary Karl Holz in 1825. It was later presented to the Royal Philharmonic Society, London, on the occasion of the Beethoven Centennial.

== Life ==
He was the younger brother of the painter Anton Ferdinand Schaller. From 1789, he attended the Academy of Fine Arts, Vienna where he studied under Hubert Maurer. In 1791, he became an apprentice at the Vienna Porcelain Manufactory. The following year, he began to study sculpture with Franz Anton von Zauner. By 1811, he had become the head of modelling at the factory. Despite his turn to sculpture, he retained his love for porcelain and acted as an artistic advisor to the factory for the rest of his life.

From 1812 to 1823 he lived in Rome on a grant from Prince Metternich, obtained for him by a patron, Count Carl Ludwig Cobenzl. While there, he became familiar with the Nazarene movement, as well as making professional contact with Antonio Canova and Bertel Thorvaldsen. He politely refused an offer from King Ludwig I to come work for him in Munich.

In 1823, he returned to Vienna, having accepted a position as Professor of Sculpture at the Academy. His most famous student there was Joseph Gasser von Valhorn. He died after a brief illness that was not believed to be serious. A street in the Viennese district of Meidling was named after him in 1907.

== Selected major works ==
- Der jugendliche Amor (The Young Cupid) (Vienna, Österreichische Galerie Belvedere, Inv. Nr. 4202), 1815/16
- Bellerophon im Kampf mit der Chimaira (Bellerophon Fighting the Chimera) (Vienna, Österreichische Galerie Belvedere), 1821
- Statue of Andreas Hofer, (Hofkirche, Innsbruck, 1827–33
- Margaretenbrunnen (Margaret the Virgin, fountain), Vienna, 1836
