= Quirinal Hill =

One of the seven hills of Rome, Italy

Coordinates: 41°54′04″N 12°29′18″E

- One of the seven hills of Rome
- Latin name: Collis Quirinalis
- Italian name: Quirinale
- Rione: Trevi
- Buildings: Gardens of Sallust, Baths of Constantine, Torre delle Milizie, Trevi Fountain,
- Palazzi: Quirinal Palace, Palazzo Baracchini
- Churches: Sant'Andrea al Quirinale, San Carlo alle Quattro Fontane
- People: Lucius Papirius Cursor
- Ancient Roman religion: Temple of Mars Ultor
- Mythological figures: Titus Tatius, Quirinus
- Roman sculptures: Horse Tamers

Schematic map of Rome showing the seven hills and Servian Wall

The Quirinal Hill (/ˈkwɪrɪnəl/ KWIRR-in-əl; Latin: Collis Quirinalis; Italian: Quirinale [kwiriˈnaːle]) is one of the seven hills of Rome, at the north-east of the city center. It is the location of the official residence of the Italian head of state, who resides in the Quirinal Palace. Other names have included the Quirinal, also referring to the Italian president, and Monte Cavallo, between the Middle Ages and the 19th century.

== History ==
According to Roman legend, the Quirinal Hill was the site of a small village of the Sabines, and king Titus Tatius would have lived there after the peace between Romans and Sabines. These Sabines had erected altars in the honour of their god Quirinus (naming the hill by this god).

Tombs from the 8th century BC to the 7th century BC that confirm a likely presence of a Sabine settlement area have been discovered; on the hill, there was the tomb of Quirinus, which Lucius Papirius Cursor transformed into a temple for his triumph after the third Samnite war. Some authors consider it possible that the cult of the Capitoline Triad (Jove, Minerva, Juno) could have been celebrated here well before it became associated with the Capitoline Hill. The sanctuary of Flora, an Osco-Sabine goddess, was here too.

According to Livy, the hill first became part of the city of Rome, along with the Viminal Hill, during the reign of Servius Tullius, Rome' sixth king, in the 6th century BC.

In 446 BC, a temple was dedicated on the Quirinal in honour of Sancus, and it is possible that this temple was erected over the ruins of another temple. Augustus, too, ordered the building of a temple, dedicated to Mars. On a slope of the Quirinal were the extensive gardens of Sallust.

On the Quirinal Hill Constantine the Great ordered the erection of his baths, the last thermae complex erected in imperial Rome. These are now lost, having been incorporated into Renaissance Rome, with only some drawings from the 16th century remaining.

In the Middle Ages, the Torre delle Milizie and the convent of St. Peter and Domenic were built, and above Constantine's building was erected the Palazzo Pallavicini-Rospigliosi; the two famous colossal marble statues of the Horse Tamers, generally identified as the Dioscuri with horses, which now are in the Piazza Quirinale, were originally in this palazzo. They gave to the Quirinal its medieval name Monte Cavallo, which lingered into the 19th century, when the hill was transformed beyond all recognition by urbanization of an expanding capital of a united Italy. In the same palazzo were also the two statues of river gods that Michelangelo moved to the steps of Palazzo Senatorio on the Capitoline Hill.

According to the political division of the center of Rome, the Hill belongs to the rione Trevi.

== Quirinal Palace ==
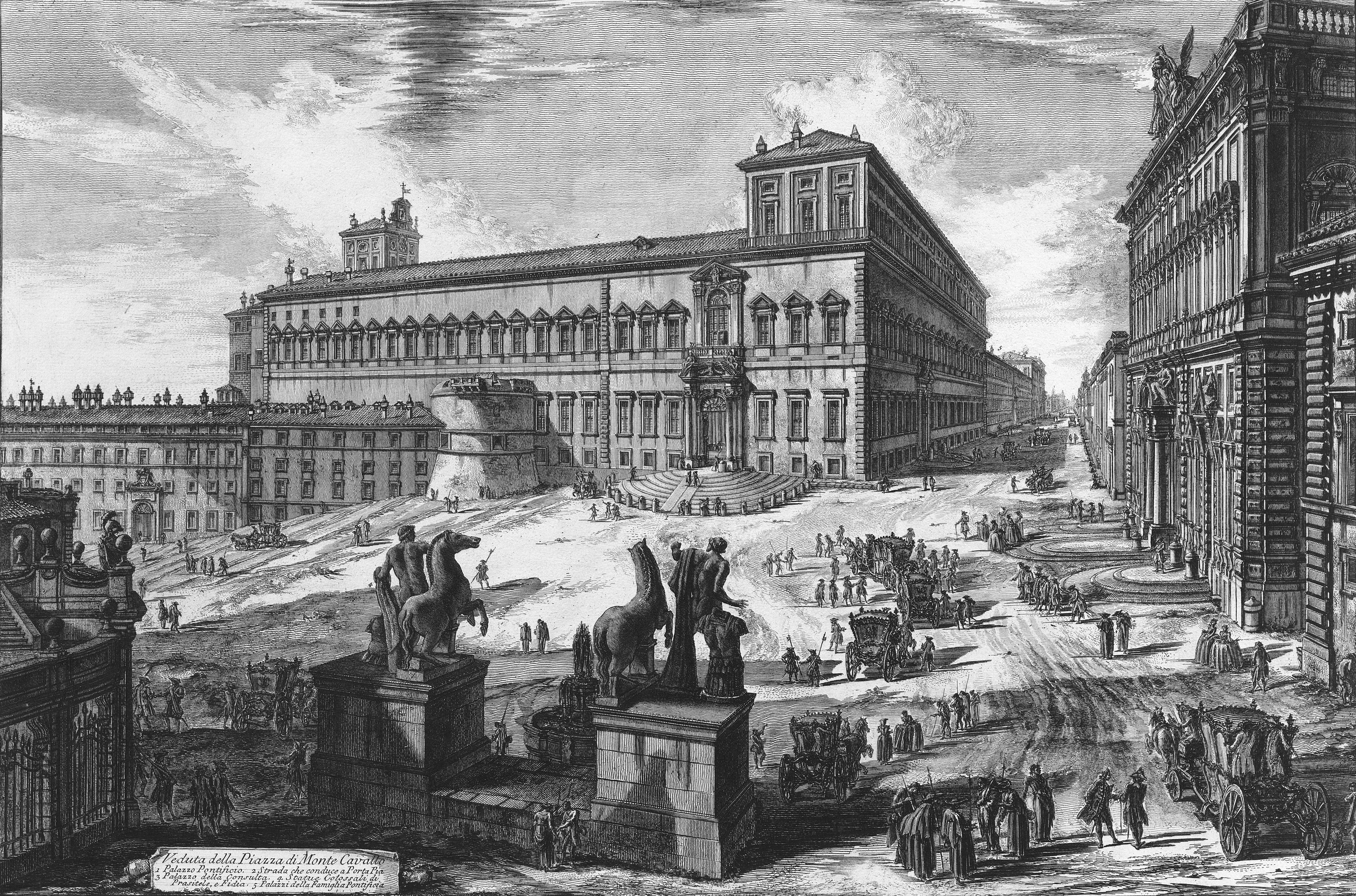
A mid-18th century etching of the Palazzo del Quirinale by Giovanni Battista Piranesi: The colossal Roman "Horse Tamers" or Dioscuri are in the foreground, but the obelisk from the Mausoleum of Augustus (erected 1781 – 1786) has not yet been set up between them.

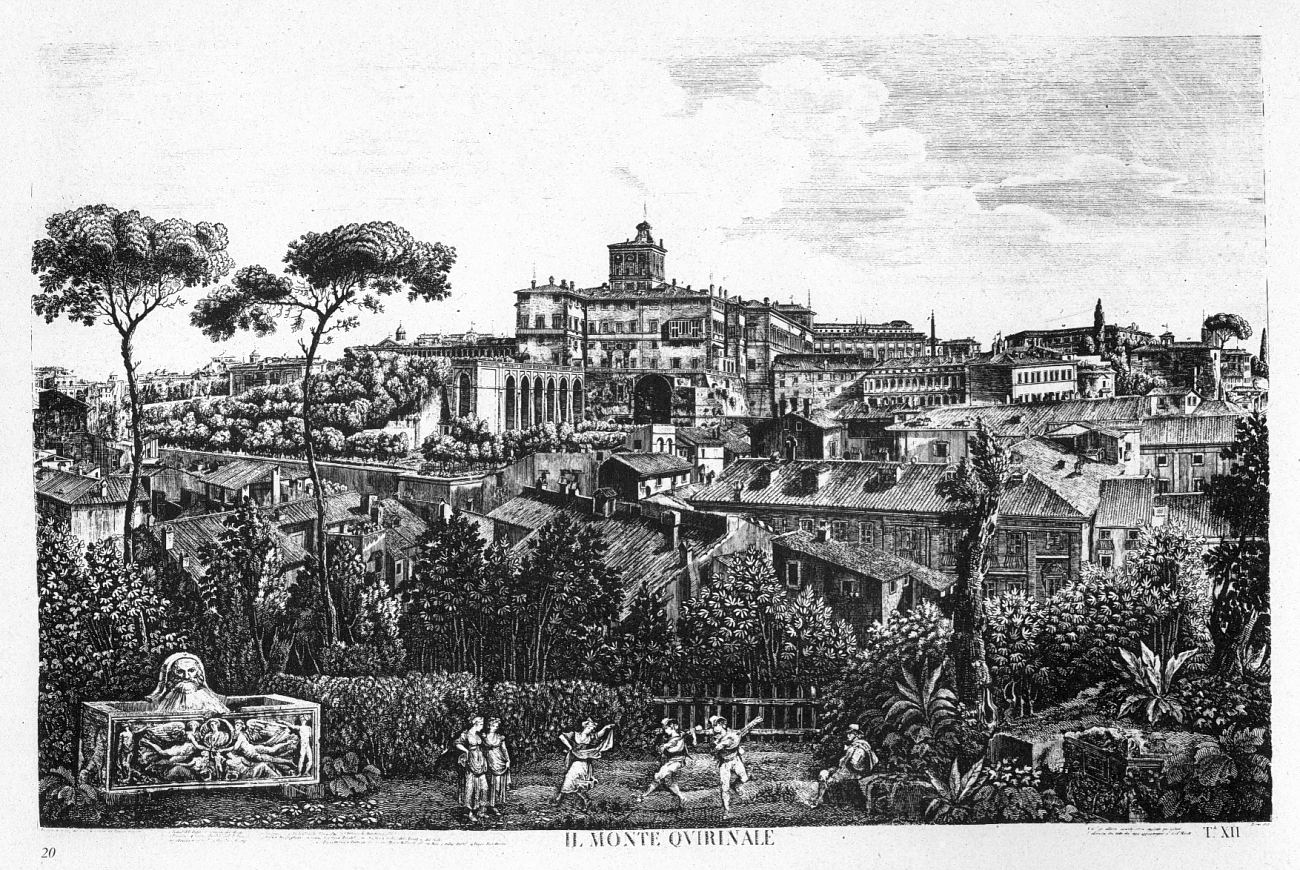
An etching of the Hill, crowned by the mass of the Palazzo del Quirinale, from a series I Sette Colli di Roma antica e moderna published in 1827 by Luigi Rossini (1790–1857): His view, from the roof of the palazzo near the Trevi Fountain that now houses the Accademia di San Luca, substituted an imaginary foreground garden for the repetitious roofscape.

The Quirinal Hill is today identified with the Quirinal Palace, the official residence of the President of the Italian Republic in Rome, and one of the symbols of the State. Before the abolition of the Italian monarchy in 1946, it was the residence of the king of Italy, and before 1871 it was, as originally, a residence of the Pope.

The healthy cool air of the Quirinal Hill attracted aristocrats and papal families that built villas where the gardens of Sallust had been in antiquity. A visit to the villa of Cardinal Luigi d'Este in 1573 convinced Pope Gregory XIII to start the building of a summer residence the following year, in an area considered healthier than the Vatican Hill or Lateran: His architects were Flaminio Ponzio and Ottaviano Nonni, called Mascherino; under Pope Sixtus V, works were continued by Domenico Fontana (the main facade on the Piazza) and Carlo Maderno, and by Gian Lorenzo Bernini for Pope Clement XII. Gardens were conceived by Maderno. In the 18th century, Ferdinando Fuga built the long wing called the Manica Lunga, which stretched 360 meters along via del Quirinale. In front lies the sloping Piazza del Quirinale where the pair of gigantic Roman marble "Horse Tamers" representing Castor and Pollux, found in the Baths of Constantine, were re-erected in 1588. In a view etched by Giovanni Battista Piranesi, the vast open space is unpaved. The Quirinal Palace was the residence of the popes until 1870, though Napoleon deported both Pius VI and Pius VII to France, and declared the Quirinal an imperial palace. When Rome was united to the Kingdom of Italy, the Quirinal became the residence of the kings until 1946.

Today, the palace hosts the offices and the apartments of the Head of State and, in its long side along via XX Settembre (the so-called Manica Lunga), the apartments that were furnished for each visit of foreign monarchs or dignitaries.

Several collections are in this Palazzo, including tapestries, paintings, statues, old carriages (carrozze), watches, furniture, and porcelain.

In Piranesi's view, the palazzo on the right is the Palazzo della Sacra Consulta, originally a villa built upon the ruins of the Baths of Constantine, which was adapted by Sixtus V as a civil and criminal court. The present façade was built in 1732–1734 by the architect Ferdinando Fuga on the orders of Pope Clement XII Corsini, whose coat-of-arms, trumpeted by two Fames, still surmounts the roofline balustrade, as in Piranesi's view. It formerly housed Mussolini's ministry of colonial affairs.

The Quirinal Palace has an area of 1.2 million ft^{2} (11 ha; 28 acres).

By metonymy "the Quirinal" has come to stand for the Italian president.

== Other monuments ==
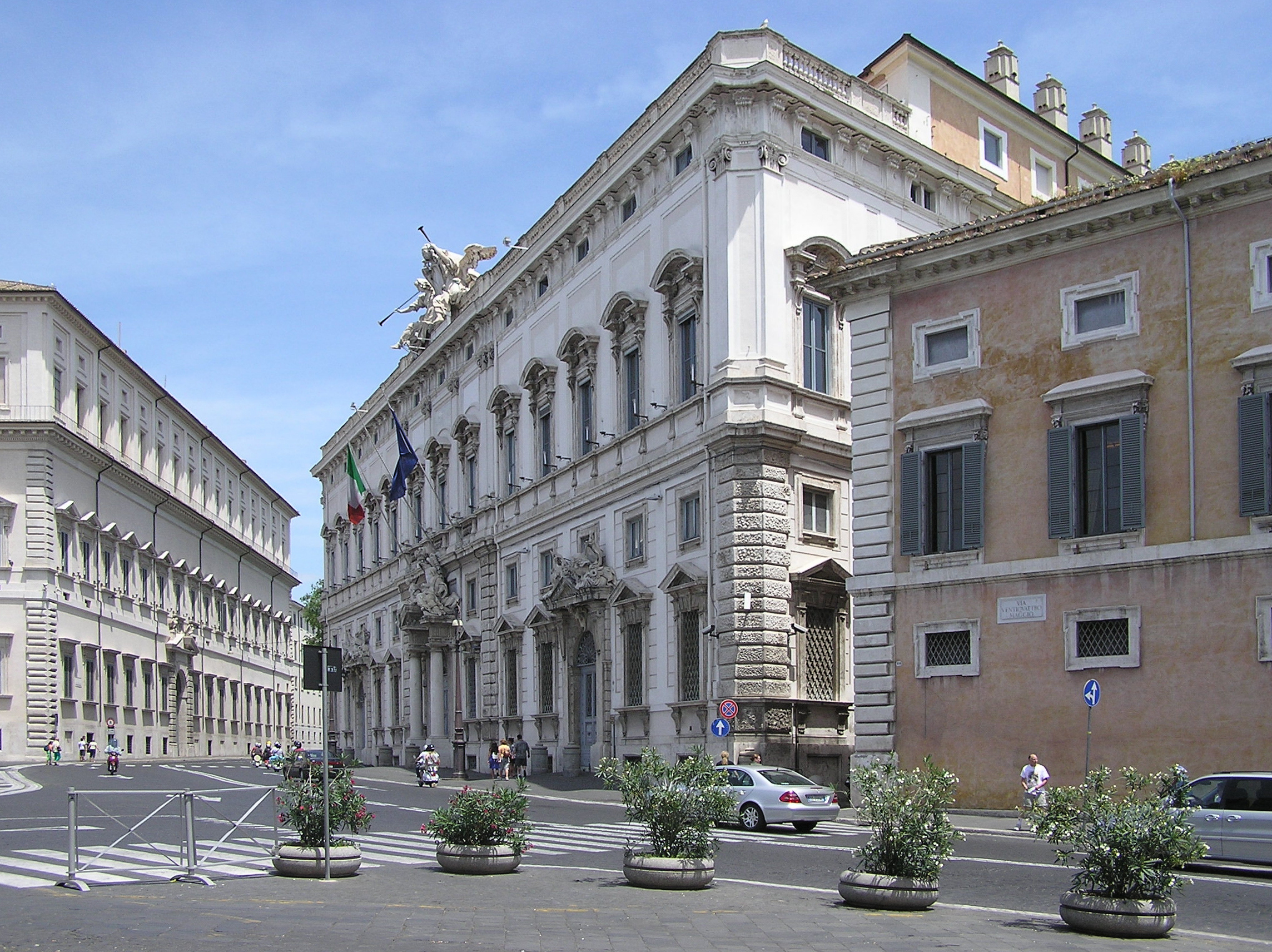
The Constitutional Court of Italy in Palazzo della Consulta, is among the Quirinal Hill government buildings in Rome.

The hill is the site of other important monuments and buildings. Many of those built during the baroque period reflect the personal and spiritual aspirations of powerful local families:

- The church of Sant'Andrea al Quirinale was designed by Gian Lorenzo Bernini (1658–1671), for Cardinal Camillo Pamphilii (nephew of Pope Innocent X); it is one of the most elegant samples of baroque architecture in Rome, with its splendid interior of marble, stuccoes, and gilded decorations.
- The four fountains (Quattro Fontane) with reclining river gods (1588–93) commissioned by Pope Sixtus V.
- Borromini's church of San Carlo alle Quattro Fontane (or San Carlino – originally Chiesa della Santissima Trinità e di San Carlo Borromeo), the first and last work of this architect (the façade was completed after his death) commissioned by the Barberini.
- The Piazza and Palazzo Barberini, built by Bernini and Maderno, which now houses the Galleria Nazionale d'Arte Antica.
- Palazzo Volpi di Misurata, across from San Carlino, built in the 18th century.
- Palazzo Albani del Drago, built by Domenico Fontana and enlarged with an added belvedere, by Alessandro Specchi for the Albani Pope Clement XI; with the decline in the fortunes of Cardinal Alessandro Albani, it was sold to the del Drago, who occupy it still.
- Palazzo Baracchini, built 1876–83, now housing the Ministry of Defense.
- The church of San Silvestro al Quirinale, which was described for the first time circa 1000, rebuilt in the 16th century and restructured (façade) in the 19th.
- The Pontifical University of Saint Thomas Aquinas, Angelicum
- The Palazzo Colonna (17th century), in front of Palazzo Pallavicini-Rospigliosi, contains some remains of Caracalla's temple of Serapis
- The Palazzo della Consulta hosts today the Constitutional Court, and was erected by Ferdinando Fuga for Pope Clement XII directly opposite Palazzo del Quirinale.
- The Palazzo Pallavicini-Rospigliosi (17th century) built by Giorgio Vasanzio and Carlo Maderno
- Proximate to the Baths of Constantine and the modern Sacripanti Palace, there is the dome of Titus Claudinanus and his female partner Claudia Vera. The local water pipes are inscribed with the initials of their names, which define Claudia as the "most notable woman" (in Latin: c(larissima) f(emina)).

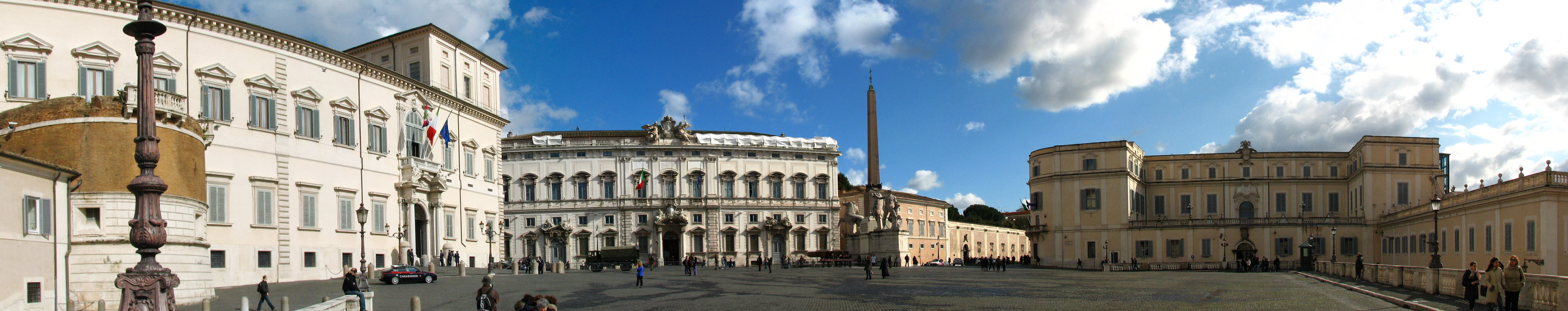
Piazza del Quirinale

== See also ==
- Seven hills of Rome
- Aventine Hill (Aventino)
- Caelian Hill (Celio)
- Capitoline Hill (Capitolino)
- Cispian Hill (Cispio)
- Esquiline Hill (Esquilino)
- Janiculum Hill (Gianicolo)
- Monte Mario
- Oppian Hill (Oppio)
- Palatine Hill (Palatino)
- Pincian Hill (Pincio)
- Vatican Hill (Vaticano)
- Velian Hill (Velia)
- Viminal Hill (Viminale)
