= Ignazio Stern =

Italian painter

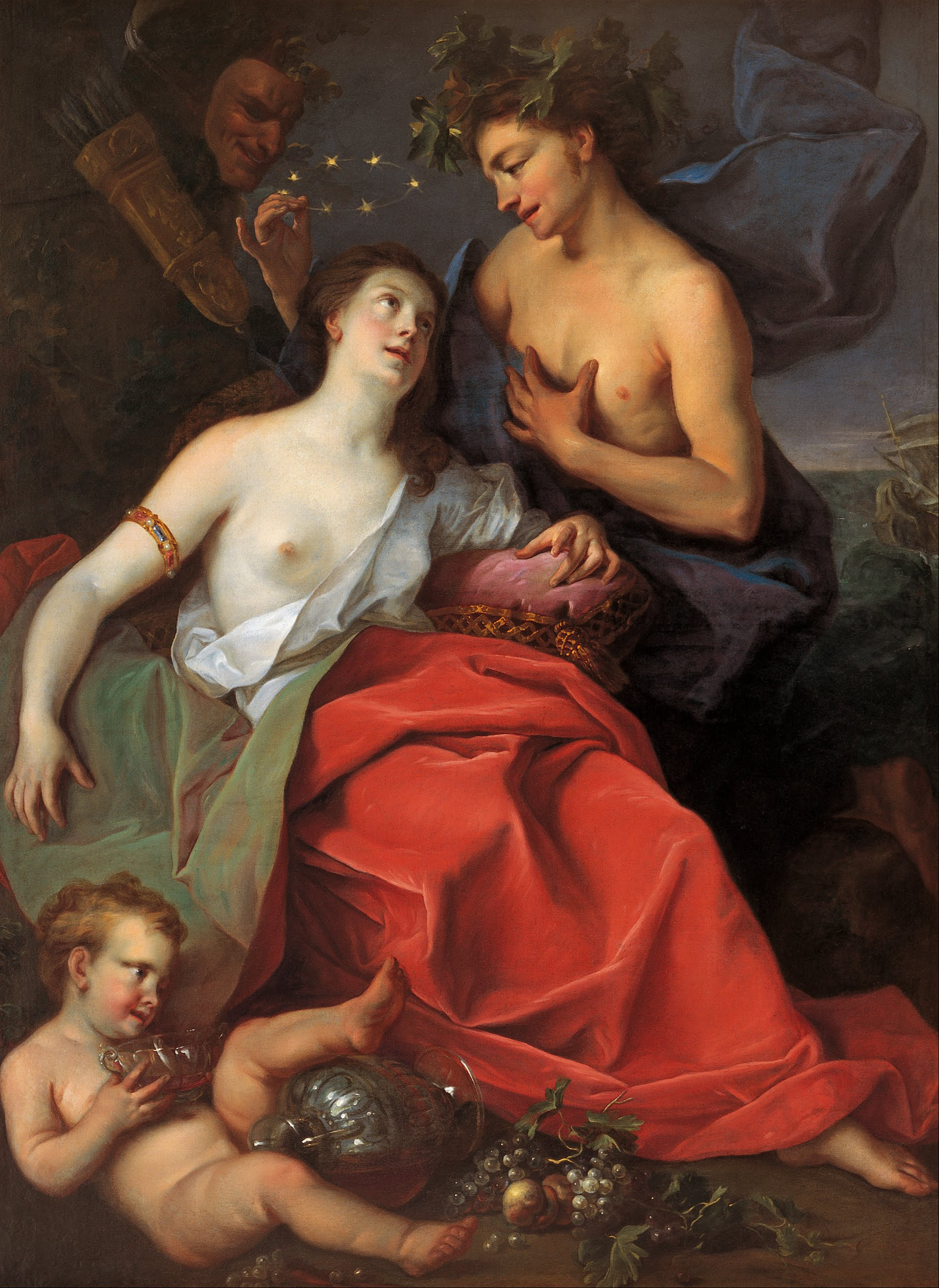
Baccus and Ariadne

Ignazio Stern (or Ignaz Stern) (January 17, 1679 – May 28, 1748), born in Mauerkirchen in Upper Austria in the Archduchy of Austria, was a Baroque painter who worked in Rome, dying there in 1748.

== Biography ==
He was a pupil of Carlo Cignani in Bologna, then in the Papal States. and worked in Lombardy, then in Rome, Papal States. He painted an Annunciation for the church of the Nunziata in Piacenza. In Rome, he frescoed the sacristy of S. Paolino, and left some oil pictures in the church of S. Elisabetta. He was the father of the painters Ludovico Stern and Veronica Stern.

== Works ==
- Allegory of Spring, Los Angeles County Museum of Art
- Sts. Sergius and Bacchus and St. Basil, Church of Sts. Sergius and Bacchus, Rome
