= Justice Schaller =

Justice Schaller may refer to:

- Albert Schaller (1857–1934), associate justice of the Minnesota Supreme Court
- Barry R. Schaller (1938–2017), associate justice of the Connecticut Supreme Court
