= Alexander Bruckmann =

German painter

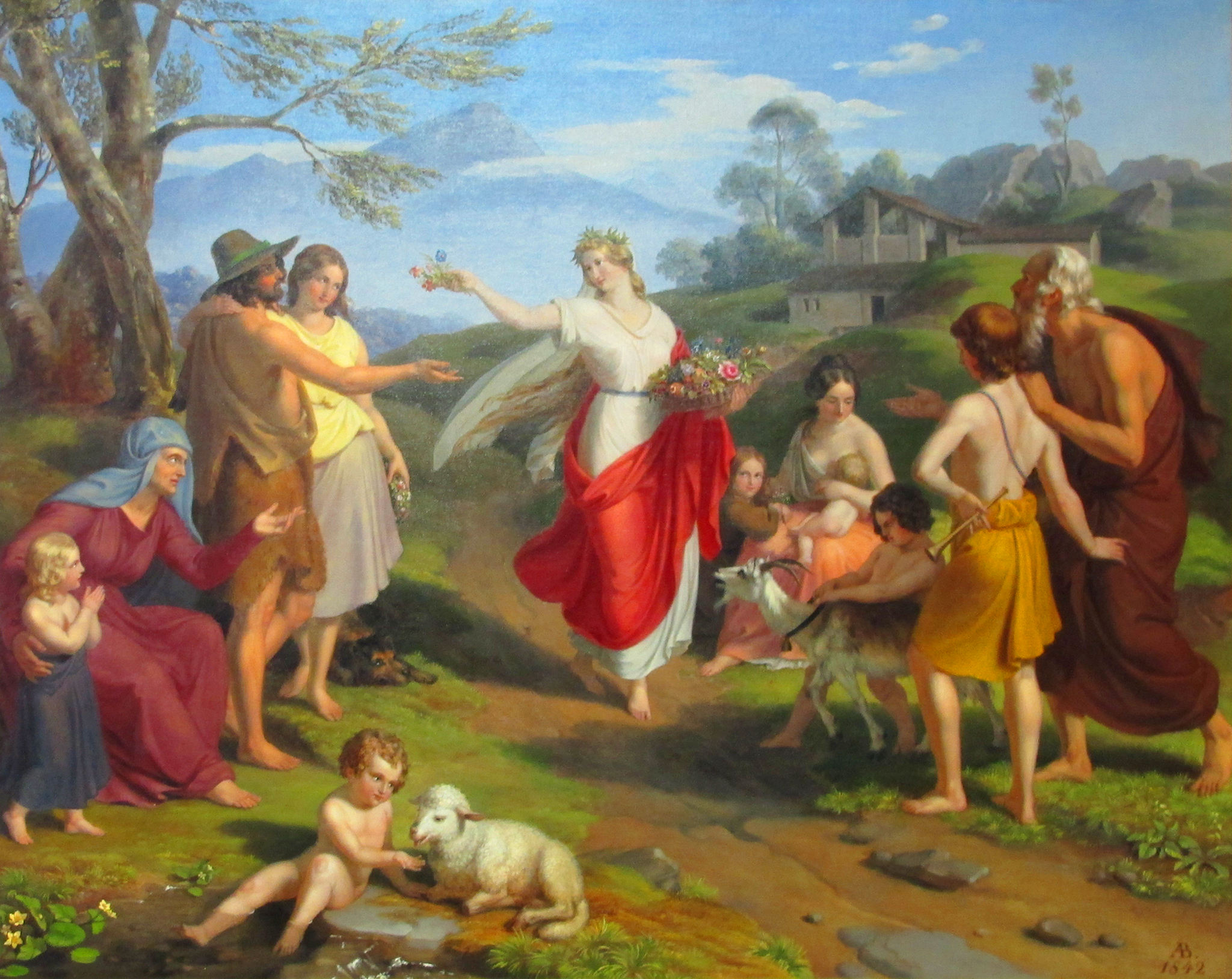
Allegory of Spring (1842)

Alexander Bruckmann (1806–1852) was a German historical and portrait painter.

== Life ==
Bruckmann was born in Reutlingen in 1806. From 1826, he studied painting under Georg Friedrich Eberhard at the Karlsschule Stuttgart, and from 1827 to 29 studied at the Academy of Fine Arts, Munich, mostly under Heinrich von Hess. From the autumn of 1829 until 1832, he lived in Rome, where he painted Barbarossa's Body Drawn out of the Calycadnus (Staatsgallerie Stuttgart), which he sent back to Germany. He spent the years from 1833 to 1839 back in Munich. In 1833, he painted fourteen pictures at the royal palace at Munich, showing subjects from the poems of Theocritus, partly from his own designs, and partly from those of Hess. Some of his most notable easel paintings, such as the Women of Weinsberg (Staatsgallerie, Stuttgart ), and The Maiden from Afar (from Schiller's "Das Madchen aus der Fremde"), are from this time.

From 1840, Bruckmann devoted himself almost entirely to portrait painting, working mostly in Stuttgart, but also in Ulm, Augsburg, Zurich, and elsewhere. He had become an ardent and self-sacrificing supporter of the political and religious reformist Friedrich Rohmer, to the disadvantage of his artistic career in Munich. He married Rohmer's sister in 1843. His only larger works from this later period were Thusnelda in der Gefangenschaft ("The Imprisonment of Thusnelda") ( Staatsgallerie, Stuttgart) and a series of frescoes in the hall of the art school at Stuttgart, showing the birth of Venus, St Luke, and an allegory of the three visual arts. The effects of a bad head injury, caused by a carriage accident in 1835, and many artistic and political disappointments, led to his suicide on 9 February 1852.

== See also ==
- List of German painters
