= Chris Schaller =

American journalist and editor

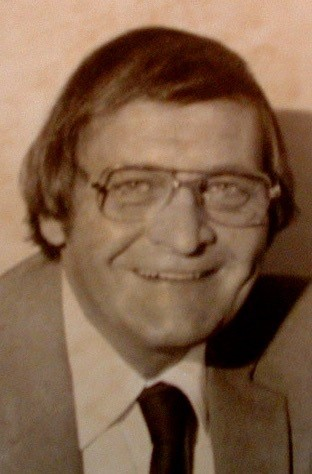
- Carson City NEVADA APPEAL photo of Chris Schaller for his column, “Observations”, 1981.
- Born: Christopher Lee Schaller; December 29, 1935
- Died: February 27, 1984 (aged 48)
- Education: George Pepperdine College
- Occupations: High level positions for three Nevada governors and Nevada state senate
- Years active: 1964-1970, 1971-1979
- Notable work: Dubbed "Nevada's Modern day Mark Twain"
- Political party: Democratic
- Spouse: Harriet Schaller
- Children: Leigh Christy Schaller (O'Neill)

Christopher Lee Schaller (December 29, 1935 – February 27, 1984) was an American journalist, columnist, editor, humorist, speechwriter, and political strategist.

Schaller held high-level positions in the administrations of three Nevada governors and a U. S. senator from Nevada. Schaller was a member of the Democratic Party, but also served a Republican governor.

Schaller was posthumously honored by political associates when they commissioned a bronze bust of him. The bust was dedicated in the State of Nevada Old Assembly Chambers and was placed under the portrait of Governor Mike O'Callaghan (D) in the Nevada State Capitol Building, in Carson City, Nevada.

== Early life ==
Christy Lee Kieser(1) was born on December 29, 1935, in Sioux City, Iowa to Burl and Eunice Christy Kieser(2). Chris and his older sister, Patricia Ann Kieser, lived in various states and in Canada(3) with his mother and step-fathers, and with maternal grandparents and friends of his mother.

At age 11, he was adopted by his mother's husband, Robert Schaller(4), and he took the Schaller name legally. His mother and Robert Schaller bore two children, Robert E and Wendy Schaller, who were Chris Schaller's half-brother and sister.

Schaller attended and graduated in 1953 from Hollywood High School in Los Angeles. During high school, he wrote a sports column for his high school newspaper. Schaller began his professional sports writing career at age 16 in 1952 with the Los Angeles Examiner.

Schaller received a journalism scholarship from the LA Examiner to George Pepperdine College

== Journalistic and political career ==
Schaller left Pepperdine in 1956 to work as sports editor at the Las Vegas Sun, and later became city editor (1960–1961).

In 1958 Schaller joined the U.S. Army and served six months active duty at Fort Ord, California before continuing in the Army Active Reserves (1958–1964).

Schaller married Harriet Jones(5), the assistant society editor of the Las Vegas SUN, on December 30, 1961. They moved to Carson City, Nevada, in 1962, where he worked as Public Information Officer for the Nevada Employment Security Department. He also wrote high school sports articles for the Carson City Nevada Appeal.

Schaller became press aide and speech writer for Nevada Governor Grant Sawyer (D) in 1964–1967. He served as the news media coordinator of the 1966 Western Governor's Conference, press aide for the 1965 and 1966 National Governor's Conference and press aide for the Western Governor's Conference.

Schaller's daughter, Leigh Christy Schaller (O'Neill) was born in Carson City on July 8, 1964.(6)

In 1967, the Schaller family moved to Washington, D.C., where he worked as speechwriter and press secretary for U.S. Senator Alan Bible (D-Nev). In 1978, Bible wrote: "To Chris Schaller—A modern day Mark Twain. Super writer and political strategist—a close and dear friend—With Warm Regards and Best Wishes. Alan Bible"

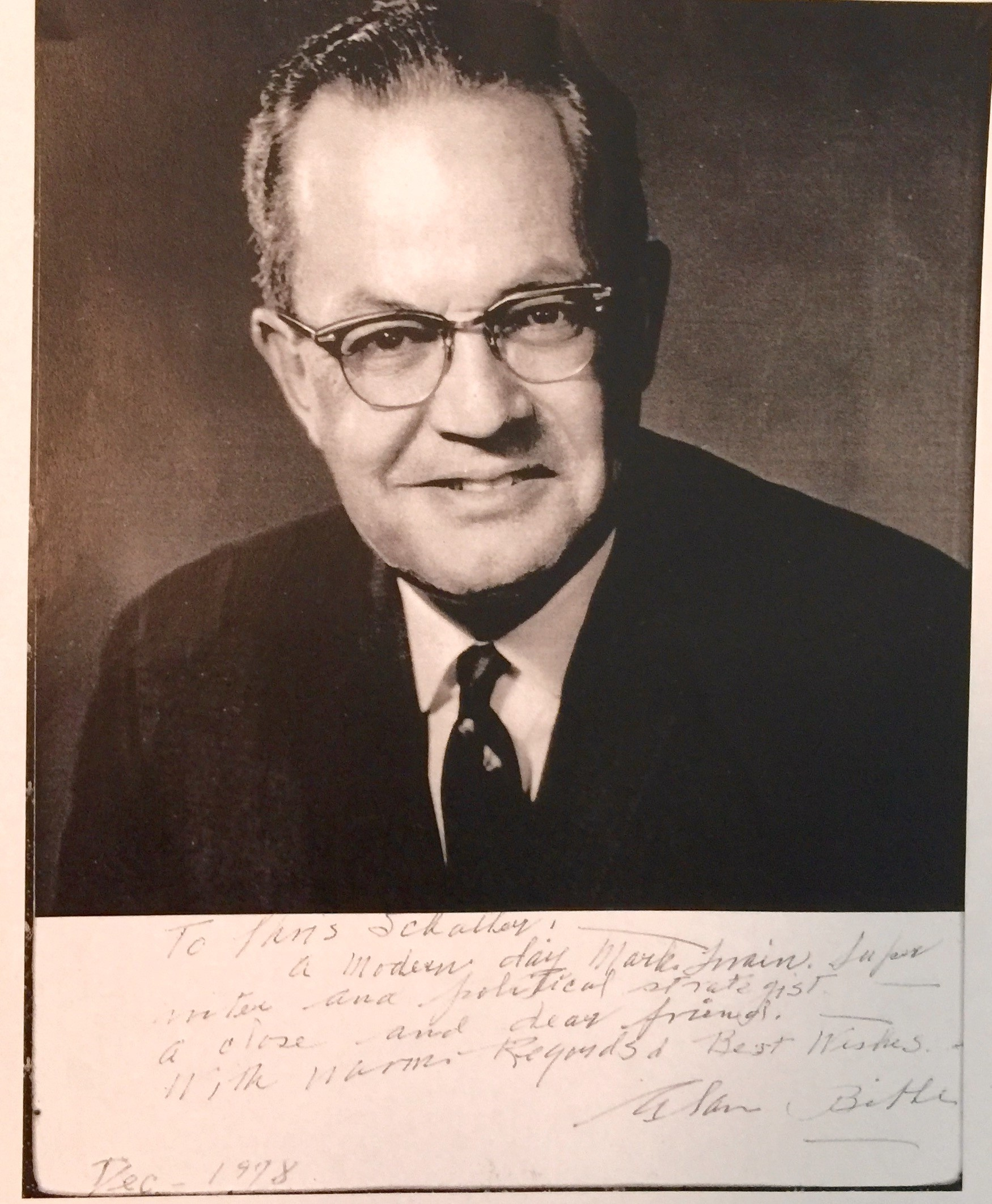
In 1978, Nevada Senator Alan Bible gave Chris Schaller a signed photograph of himself. The inscription to Schaller reads: "To Chris Schaller—A modern day Mark Twain. Super writer and political strategist—a close and dear friend—With Warm Regards and Best Wishes. Alan Bible"

Schaller took a leave of absence from the Senate in 1970 to manage the Nevada gubernatorial campaign of Mike O'Callaghan. He resigned from Senator Bible's staff six months later to serve as chief of staff for Governor O'Callaghan from 1971 to 1979.

In 1979 Schaller was retained as chief-of-staff for newly elected Nevada Governor Robert List (R). According to the National Governor's Association, Schaller was the only person to serve as top advisor to two governors of opposite political affiliation, and was the only person to serve two terms as chairman of the Western Governor's Conference Staff Advisory Committee.

At age 44 in 1980 Schaller left the List administration to work for the advertising firm of Reber, Glenn and Marz in Reno, Nevada. He became the president of Campaign Consultants. A year later he also began writing a humorous political column for the Nevada Appeal, titled "Observations".

In 1982, Chris Schaller was the commencement speaker for Leigh Christy Schaller Carson City High School graduation.

He advised his daughter's high school graduating class not to rely on politicians, however he also told the class that what they thought and did about their government could make a difference.

== Death, acknowledgements and legacy ==
Chris Schaller died on February 27, 1984, at Washoe Medical Center, Reno, Ruthe Deskin wrote in her column in the Las Vegas SUN that Schaller was "indeed a man of virtue". The headstone at the Genoa Nevada Cemetery, where Schaller is buried, is inscribed "A Man of Virtue".

Governor Mike O'Callaghan's eulogy to Chris Schaller was published in the Las Vegas Sun:

"Chris Schaller wasn't an elected official or millionaire businessman, but he probably left a deeper imprint on Nevada than has any other single person during the past 20 years." O'Callaghan went on to say that Schaller "helped mold legislation into law so we can all have a better life." He praised Schaller for his work to help other people, feed the poor and prevent future wars.

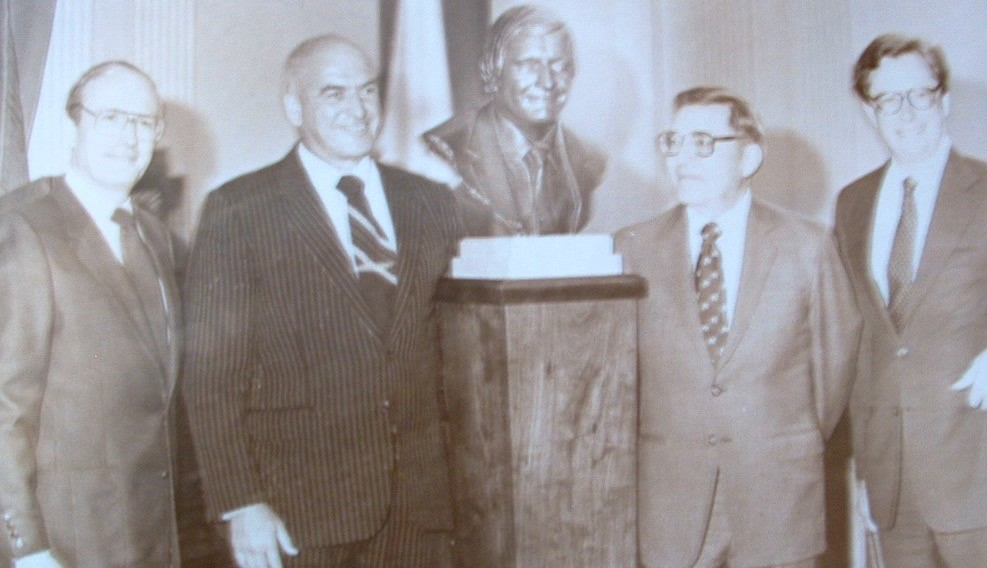
Four Nevada governors acknowledge Chris Schaller's contributions to their state. In attendance at the unveiling of the Chris Schaller bronze bust on May 19, 1986, were L-R then-current governor Richard Bryan, former governor Mike O'Callaghan, former governor Grant Sawyer and former governor Robert List.

The Chris Schaller Memorial Award was created by WE CAN (organization working to Eliminate Child Abuse and Neglect), in 1984, in recognition of his contributions of helping to enact legislation to protect abused and neglected children. The first annual Chris Schaller Memorial Award for WE CAN was presented to Judge John Mendoza in 1989.

A Chris Schaller Journalism scholarship was established at the Schaller family's request.

The 1984 Reno Padres baseball team season was dedicated to Schaller and Ray Kroc.

The Carson City animal facility was dedicated, in 1985, as the Chris Schaller Memorial Animal Care Facility.

The Chris Schaller Trust Fund was created, in 1984, to defray his medical expenses. The "Fund" held a cocktail party at the Governor's Mansion and two boxing matches in his honor.

Two years after his death, a group of friends and associates wanted to create a permanent memoriam for Schaller. They called their effort “The Campaign to Bust Schaller”, and commissioned sculptor Kristin Lothrop of Manchester. Mass. to create a bronze bust. The bust was unveiled in the old senate chambers of the Nevada State Capitol Building on May 19, 1986. In attendance were the current governor, Richard Bryan, and former governors Robert List, Grant Sawyer and Mike O'Callaghan. Prior to the placement of the Schaller bust, there was only one bronze bust in the Capitol of Abraham Lincoln.

== Footnotes ==
1. Chris (Christy) was named for his maternal grandfather, W. Harry Christy.
1. Burl Kieser worked most of his life for the US Postal Service in Sioux City, Iowa. After his divorce from Eunice Christy, he remarried and had one other child, a daughter.
1. Chris spent his childhood in Iowa; Harrisburg and Eddyville, Ill.; Berkeley, Fresno, Whittier and Santa Monica, CA.; Vancouver, British Columbia; Tacoma, Washington.
1. Robert Schaller married Eunice Christy, Chris Schaller's mother, in April, 1946. He was financial Manager at Hollywood High School.
1. Chris and Harriet Schaller were married on December 30, 1961, at the Grace Community Church in Boulder City, NV. Late in 1962, Harriet Schaller's mother (Edythe Christianson) died in an auto accident, and Harriet's two half-brothers, Alan and Theodore, went to live with Chris and Harriet Schaller in Carson City.
1. Leigh Schaller graduated from Syracuse University and Villanova School of Law. She married James O'Neill in Carson City, Nevada, on September 2, 1989. Their wedding reception was held in the gardens of the Nevada Governor's Mansion. They raised their three children, Christopher James, Brian Patrick and Lindsay Anne in the Carson City area and near Richmond, Virginia.
