= Anton Ferdinand Schaller =

Austrian painter

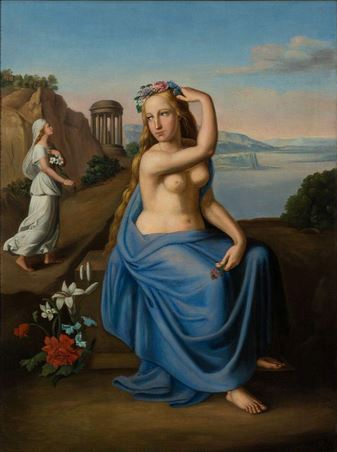
Allegory of Spring

Anton Ferdinand Schaller (6 March 1773 – 26 September 1844) was an Austrian painter in the Classical style.

== Biography ==
Schaller was born and died in Vienna. His father was a lathe operator at the Imperial State Porcelain Manufactory. His younger brother, Johann Nepomuk, became a sculptor. Anton was originally apprenticed to a potter, but displayed more aptitude for art and, from 1789, attended a course on handicrafts and decorative sculpture, sponsored by the Academy of Fine Arts, that was taught by Johann Baptist Hagenauer.

He also served as an apprentice at the Manufactory, where his drawing skills were recognized by its director, Matthäus von Niedermayer, about whom little is known, other than his corporate practices. After Anton was awarded a prize for an oil painting of a scene from Iphigenia in Tauris, by Goethe, Niedermayer commissioned him to create porcelain designs based on historical paintings. From 1801 to 1807, he worked as the first figure painter at the Manufactory.

At that time, he developed an unspecified nervous disorder that prevented him from working until 1818. The following year, he became a "Korrektor" at the Academy's painting and sculpture school.

In addition to his professional work, he did numerous drawing studies of nature and anatomy. In 1831, this led to an appointment as Professor of anatomical drawing at the Academy. From that point on, most of his energies were devoted to teaching, with an occasional oil painting, mostly on historical themes. Later, he became a member of the Academy. He also wrote essays on art, to accompany his classes; some of which have been published in several editions.

He had two sons who also became artists; Eduard, a church and history painter, and Ludwig, a sculptor.

== Sources ==
- Schaller, Anton. In: Georg Kaspar Nagler: Neues allgemeines Künstler-Lexicon, Band 15, Verlag von E. A. Fleischmann, München 1845, S. 138–139 (, p. 138, at Google Books)
- Constantin von Wurzbach: "Schaller, Anton." In: Biographisches Lexikon des Kaiserthums Oesterreich (Biographical Lexicon of the Empire of Austria). Part 29 Kaiserlich-königliche Hof- und Staatsdruckerei, Vienna 1875, p. 92 f. (digitalised).
- Hyacinth Holland (1890). "Schaller, Anton" . Allgemeine Deutsche Biographie (in German). Vol. 30. Leipzig: Duncker & Humblot. p. 558.
- S. Krasa-Florian: "Schaller, Anton Ferdinand". In: Österreichisches Biographisches Lexikon 1815–1950 (ÖBL). Vol. 10, Austrian Academy of Sciences, Vienna 1994, ISBN 3-7001-2186-5, p. 33.
