= Piazza del Quirinale =

Square in Rome, Italy

- Square
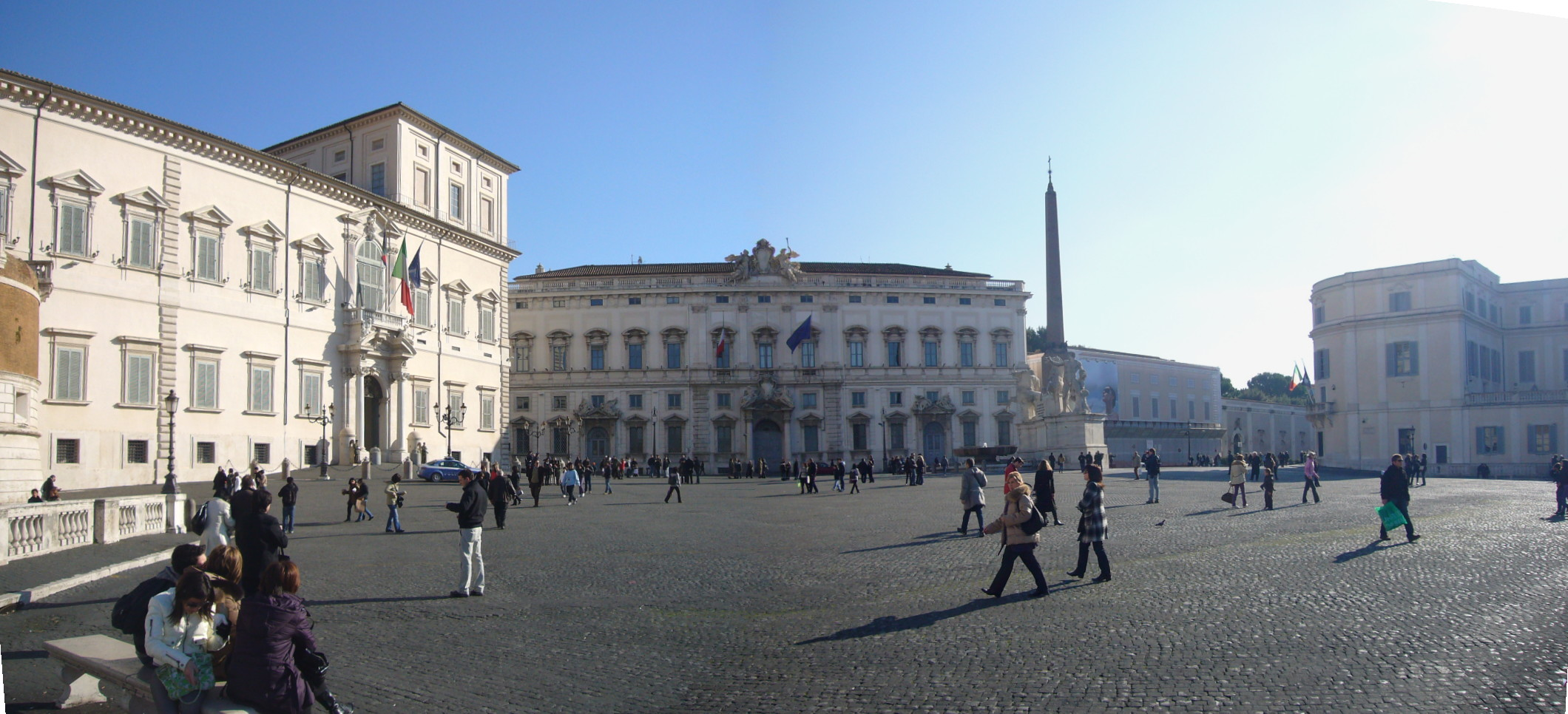
- Location: Rome, Italy
- Interactive map of Piazza del Quirinale

Piazza del Quirinale is a square outside Quirinal Palace in Rome, Italy.
