= Church treasury =

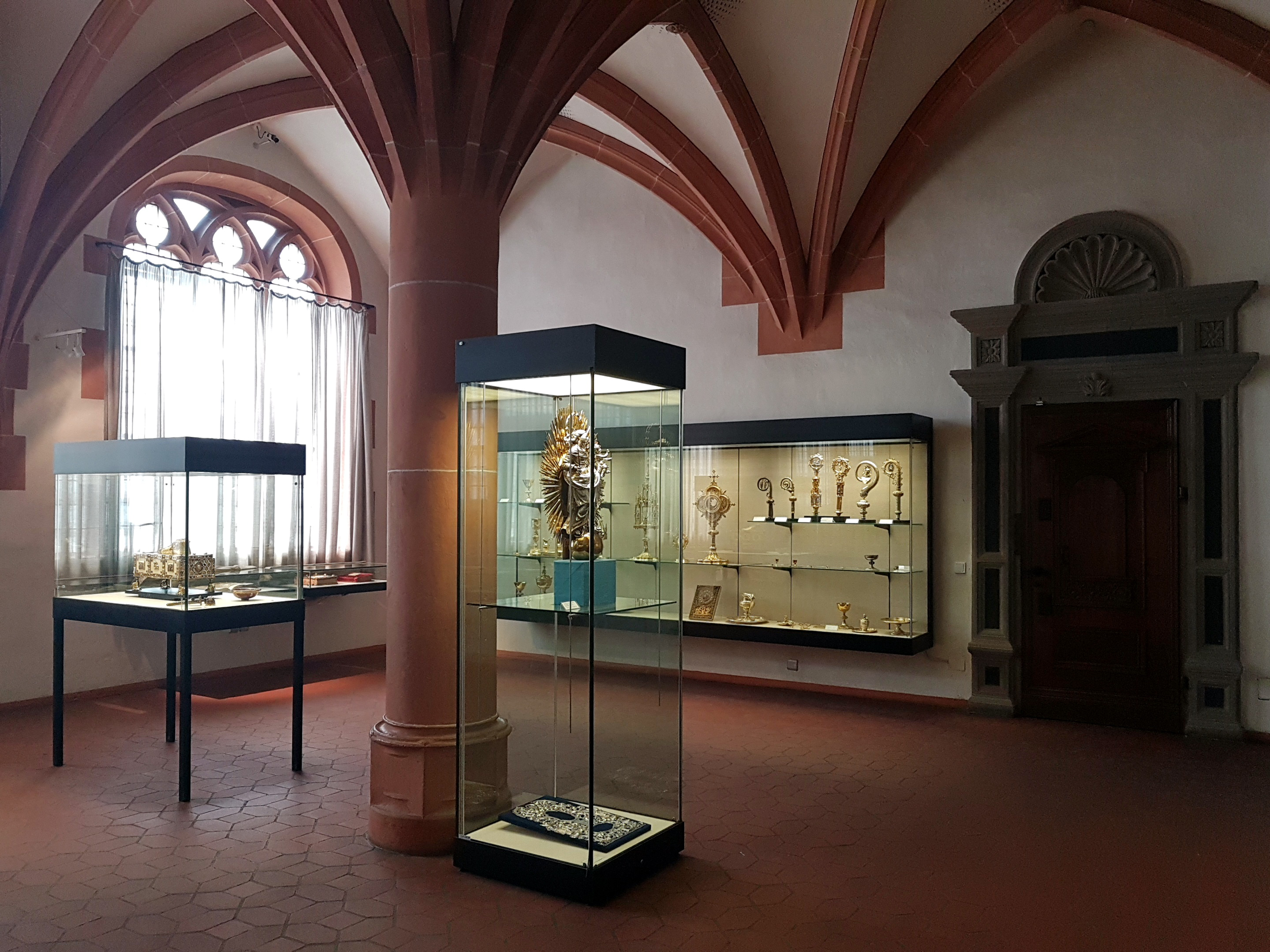
Trier Cathedral Treasury

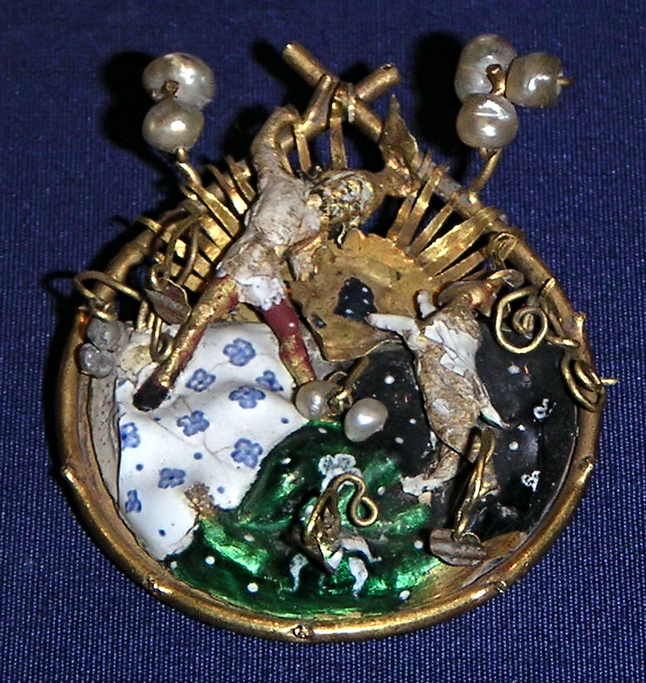
Burgundian ronde-bosse enamel brooch in the Essen treasury. The Essen treasure contains sixteen of these rare pieces of jewelry from the 14th century.

A church treasury or church treasure is the collection of historical art treasures belonging to a church, usually a cathedral or monastery (monastery treasure). Such "treasure" is usually held and displayed in the church's treasury or in a diocesan museum. Historically the highlight of church treasures was often a collection of reliquaries.

As a result of gifts and the desire to acquire sacred artifacts, many churches over the centuries gathered valuable and historic collections of altar plates, illuminated manuscripts of liturgical or religious books, as well as vestments, and other works of art or items of historical interest. Despite iconoclasm, secularism, looting, fire, the enforced sale of treasure in times of financial difficulty, theft and other losses, much of this treasure has survived or has even been repurchased. Many large churches have been displaying their riches to visitors in some form for centuries.

== Examples and museums of important church and cathedral treasures ==
Austria:

- Salzburg Cathedral Museum
- Imperial Treasury in the Hofburg Palace, Vienna
- Cathedral museum in the cathedral church of St. Stephen of Vienna, also called St. Stephen's Cathedral.

Belgium:

- Basilica of Our Lady, archeological site and religious art museum ("Teseum"), Tongeren

Czech Republic:

- Treasury of St. Vitus Cathedral, Prague

England:

- Most cathedrals have treasuries, though these generally lack the medieval metalwork of continental treasuries, which did not survive the Reformation. The exceptions to this include:
- Canterbury Cathedral
- Lincoln Cathedral
- Durham Cathedral

France:

- Cathedral Notre-Dame de Paris
- Cathedral-Basilica of Saint-Denis
- Cathedral of Reims, in Palace of Tau

Germany:

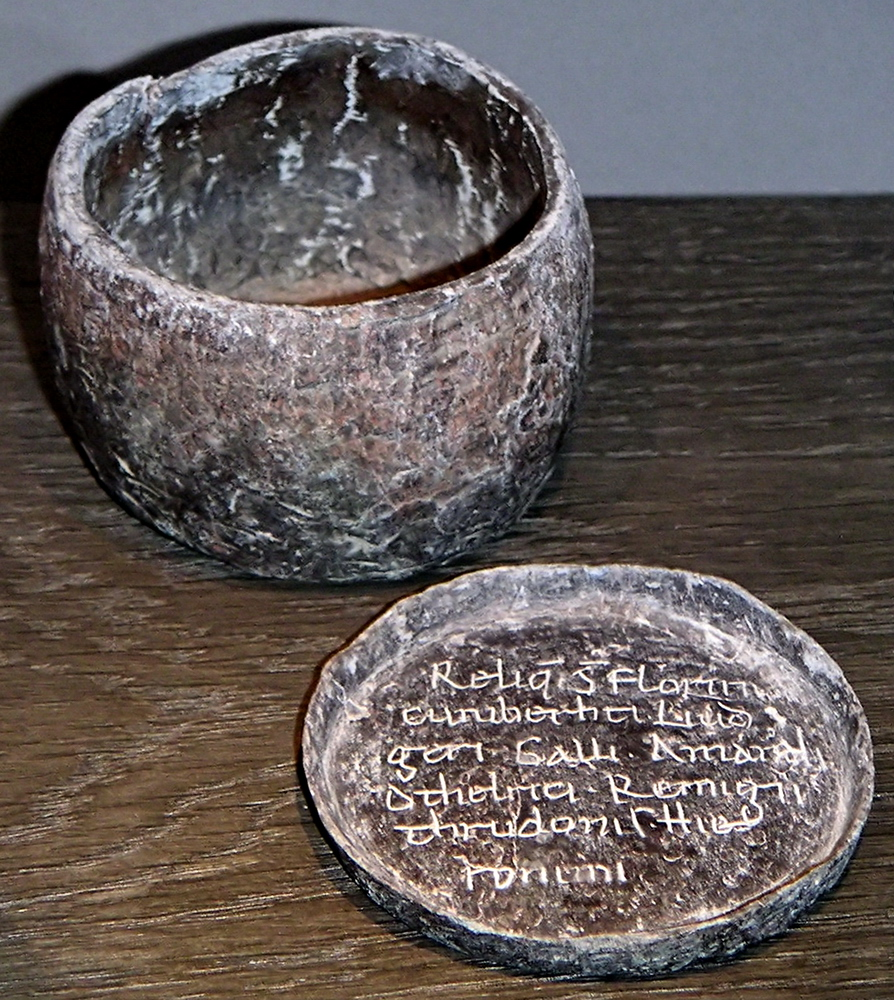
Reliquary from the abandoned altars of the East Choir in Essen Minster, dating from 1054

- Aachen Cathedral Treasure
- Diocesan Museum, Bamberg, formerly the cathedral treasure of Bamberg Cathedral
- Treasure of Brunswick Cathedral, very much later called the Welf Treasure, since 1928 largely sold
- Essen Cathedral Treasure
- Halberstadt Cathedral Treasure
- Hildesheim Cathedral Museum (Cathedral treasure and diocesan museum)
- Treasury of Cologne Cathedral
- Cathedral and Diocesan Museum, Mainz with treasury in St. Nicholas' Chapel
- Diocesan Museum, Osnabrück with the cathedral treasure
- Archepiscopal Diocesan Museum and Treasury, Paderborn
- Cathedral Treasury and Diocesan Museum, Passau
- Speyer Cathedral Treasure in the Historical Museum of the Palatinate
- Quedlinburg Cathedral Treasure
- Bishopric Museums, Regensburg
- Trier Cathedral Treasury
- Würzburg Cathedral Treasure
- Stift Museum, Xanten, previously the Xanten Cathedral Treasury (Domschatzkammer Xanten)

- also the cathedrals of Bautzen, Eibingen, Merseburg, Minden, Naumburg etc

Italy:

- Bozen Cathedral Treasure
- Brixen Cathedral Treasure
- Monza Cathedral, with the Iron Crown of Lombardy, the Late Antique ivory Poet and Muse diptych, of about 500, as well as several of the small metal 6th century Monza ampullae
- Troia Cathedral Treasure (planned to be transferred to the diocesan museum)
- Monreale Cathedral, important church treasure
- Palermo Cathedral, treasure includes the crown of Empress Constance of Aragon
- Treasury of St Mark's Basilica, Venice, famous for its collection of Byzantine loot
- St Peter's, Rome, and many other Roman churches

Netherlands:

- Church treasure of Saint Servatius Basilica, Maastricht

Portugal:

- Braga Cathedral Treasure

Spain:

- El Escorial

Switzerland:

- Treasure of the Basel Minster

== See also ==
- Reliquary

== Literature ==
- Lucas Burkart: Das Blut der Märtyrer. Genese, Bedeutung und Funktion mittelalterlicher Schätze. Böhlau, Cologne, 2009, ISBN 978-3-412-20104-3
