= Hodegon Monastery =

Historic monastery in Constantinople

Coordinates: 41°0′32.51″N 28°59′6.12″E

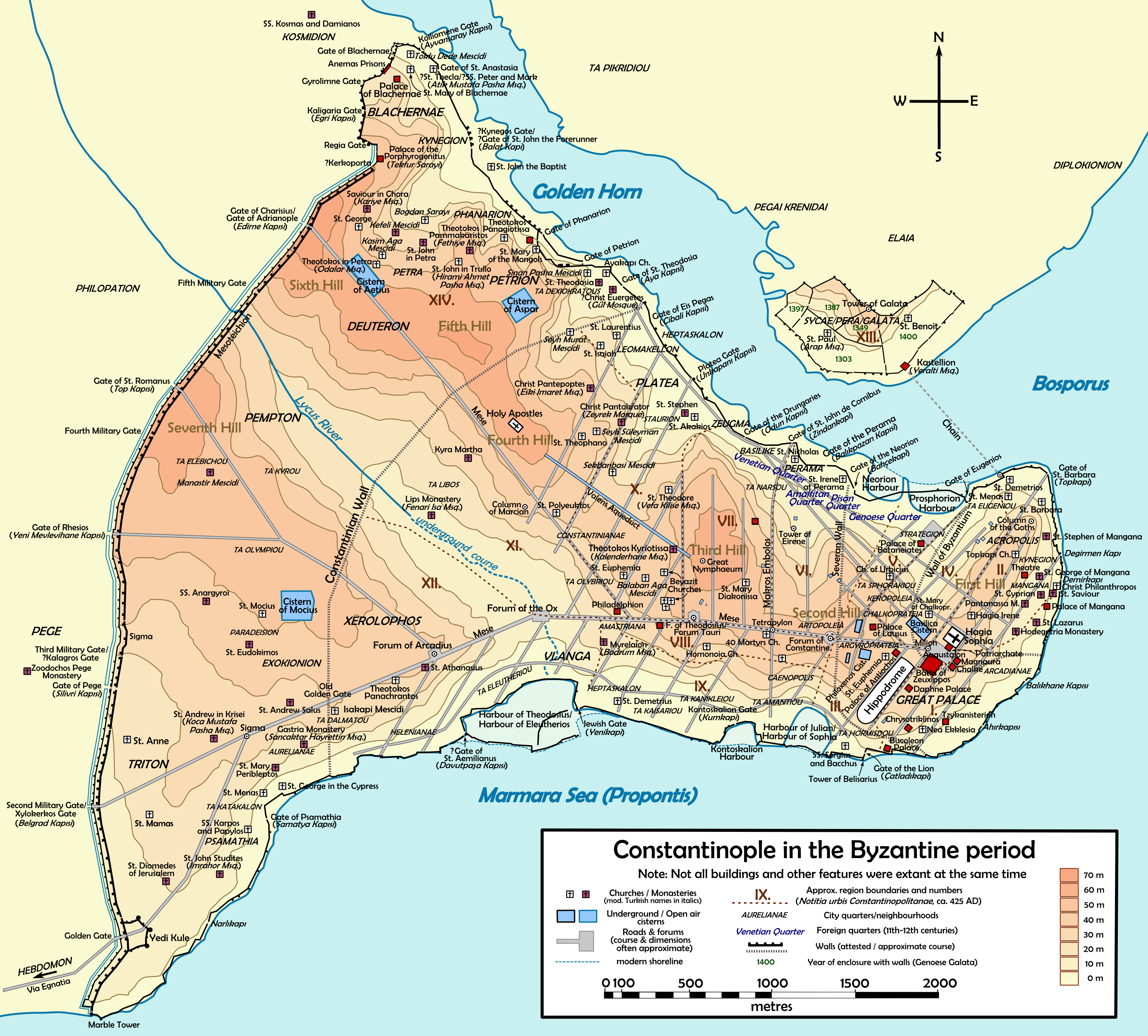
Map of Byzantine Constantinople (The Hodegon Monastery is found in the middle of the eastern coastline, due east of the Hagia Sophia)

The Hodegon Monastery (also Monastery of the Panaghia Hodegetria or Monastery of the Hodegoi) in Constantinople was allegedly founded by Saint Pulcheria (399–453), a daughter of Emperor Arcadius. The monastery is considered one of the three main Marian foundations built in the city along with the Blachernai and the Chalkoprateia.

The monastery was situated beyond the Chalkoprateia by the sea and served as the counterpart of the Blachernai so that these structures bracket the city of Constantinople as well as the processions such as the weekly Blachernai procession that began at the Theodosian walls and ended at Chalkoprateia. However, the exact location of the monastery is still subject to discussion. The Hodegon Monastery is believed to be named after the term hodegoi, which referred to the guides who led the blind toward the miraculous well within the structure.

Tradition states that the monastery held the Icon of the Hodegetria, believed to have been painted by Saint Luke. According to an account by Xanthopoulos, this relic was brought from Antioch. While it was at Hodegon, Ruy Gonzales de Clavijo described it sometime in 1403 to 1406 as a painting with a square panel that was covered with precious stones such as emeralds, sapphires, topaz, and pearls. When the icon was sent to Pulcheria, she took a vow of chastity. The name of the icon, Panagia Hodegetria ("She who shows the Way"), is given through the legend which tells that nearby the church of the monastery was a source where the blind and all who suffered eye disorders came to be healed, since the Holy Virgin would have appeared to two blind people and guided them here where she restored their vision. The sanctuary was rebuilt by Emperor Michael III (842–867) but today only a few ruins are visible near Gülhane Park.

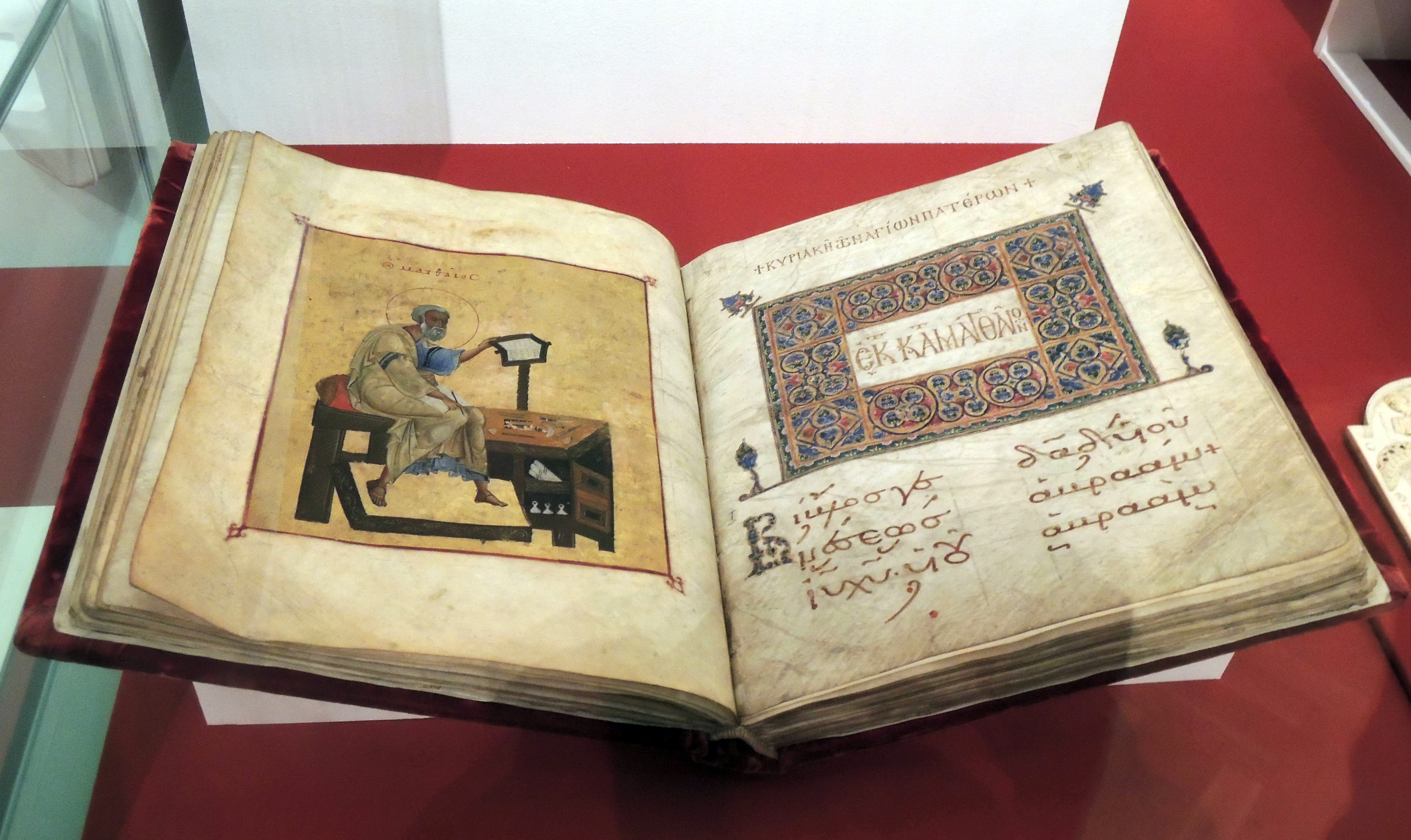
Gospels from Hodegon scriptory (11-14th c.)
