= Treasure of the Basel Minster =

The Treasure of the Basel Minster was the church treasure of the Basel Minster in Switzerland, gathered there over a period of more than 500 years. During the Middle Ages, Basel was the seat of the Diocese of Basel, and its Minster contained an extraordinarily rich treasure. During the Partition of the canton of Basel in 1833, the treasury was split between Basel-City and Basel-Country, and the part falling to Basel-Country was split up and sold.

== History ==
The recorded history of the treasure begins with the consecration of the Minster in 1019. During five centuries, it contained a growing collection of reliquaries, monstrances and crosses. The treasure survived the iconoclasm of the reformation, during which many religious artworks in Switzerland were destroyed, relatively unscathed, but lost its non-metallic parts, such as books and paraments. In 1590, a large part of the vasa sacra were molten for their material value. After long conflicts between city and cathedral, the treasure was locked away in the sacristy of the Minster, where it remained for the next 240 years.

When the Canton of Basel was split during violent conflicts in the early 1830s, the Minster Treasure was split between the two resulting half-cantons of Basel-City and Basel-Country. The Federal Diet of Switzerland, which by its actions had allowed the partition to continue, decreed on November 25, 1833, that the treasure would be split, with 36% falling to Basel-City and 64% to Basel-Country. Because the Basel-Country was greatly in need of repairing its finances after the partition, it put its part of the treasure up for auction in 1836, which thereby became scattered all over the world.

Today, valuable reliquaries and liturgical from the treasure form part of the collections of various museums, such as the Bavarian National Museum, the Kunstgewerbemuseum Berlin, the British Museum as well as the Victoria and Albert Museum in London, the Rijksmuseum in Amsterdam, the Metropolitan Museum of Art in New York City and the Musée de Cluny in Paris. Those elements that remained in Basel or were subsequently reacquired are exhibited in the Historisches Museum Basel.

== Pieces ==
=== Antependium of Basel ===
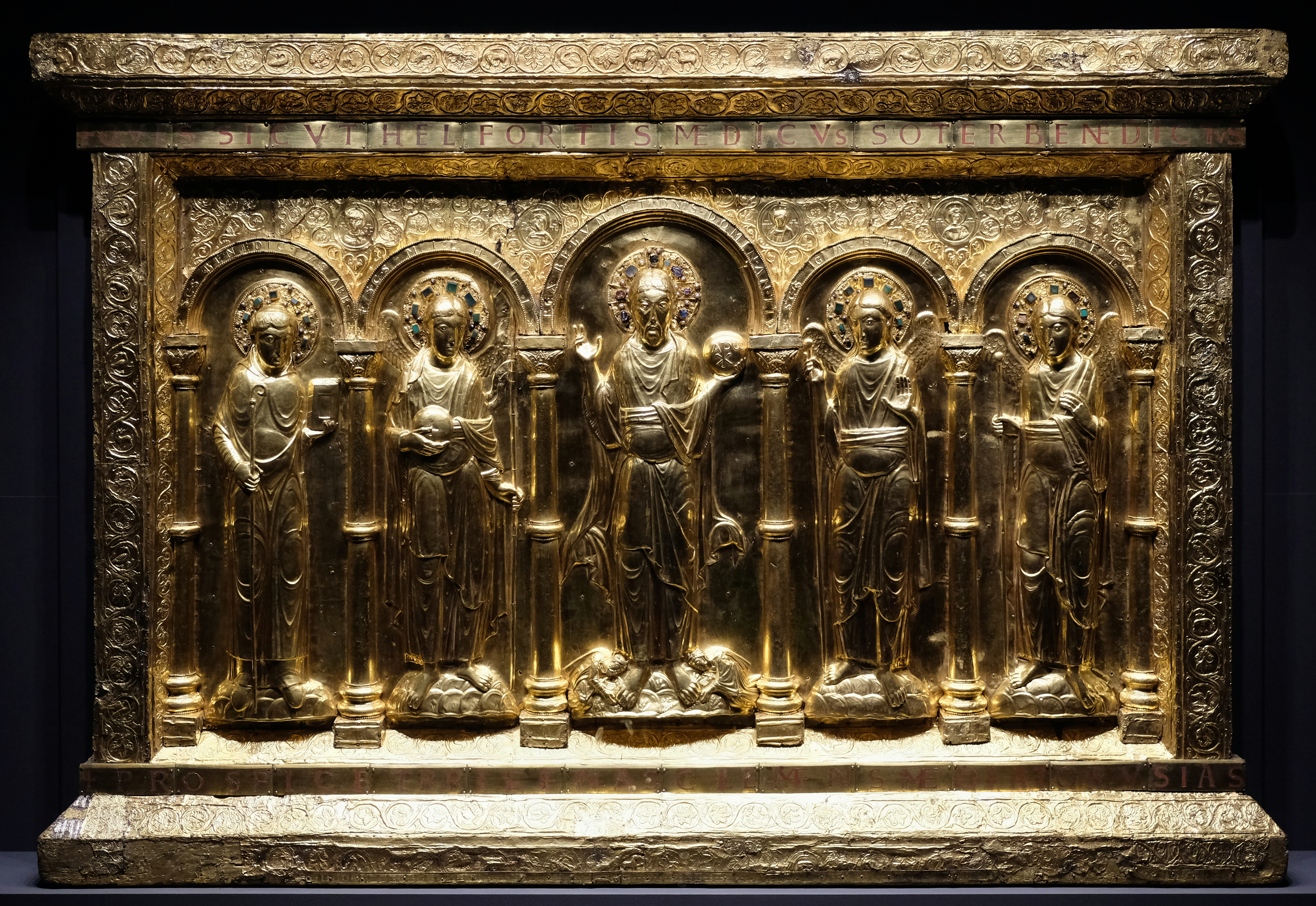
Antependium of Basel in the Musée de Cluny

The Antependium of Basel is a golden altar frontal donated by emperor Henry II, possibly in the year 1019. It is considered to be one of the masterpieces of Ottonian art. The Antependium is a thin golden plate on an oak wood base, 120 cm high and 178 cm wide. It is decorated with repoussé images of five figures standing in arcades: Saint Benedict of Nursia, the archangel Michael, Christ the Salvator and the archangels Gabriel and Raphael. Small figures of Emperor Henry and his wife Cunigunde are crouching and praying at the feet of Christ. In the spandrels above, amongst dense foliage containing grapes, pomegranates, birds and mammals, the four cardinal virtues are represented.

During the Middle Ages, the tablet would be shown in front of the altar of the Basel Minster only a few times per year. After the French Revolution, it was first sold in 1827 for 8875 Swiss francs. In 1854, it was bought for 50.000 francs by the Musée de Cluny, where it is exhibited today.

=== Cross of Henry ===
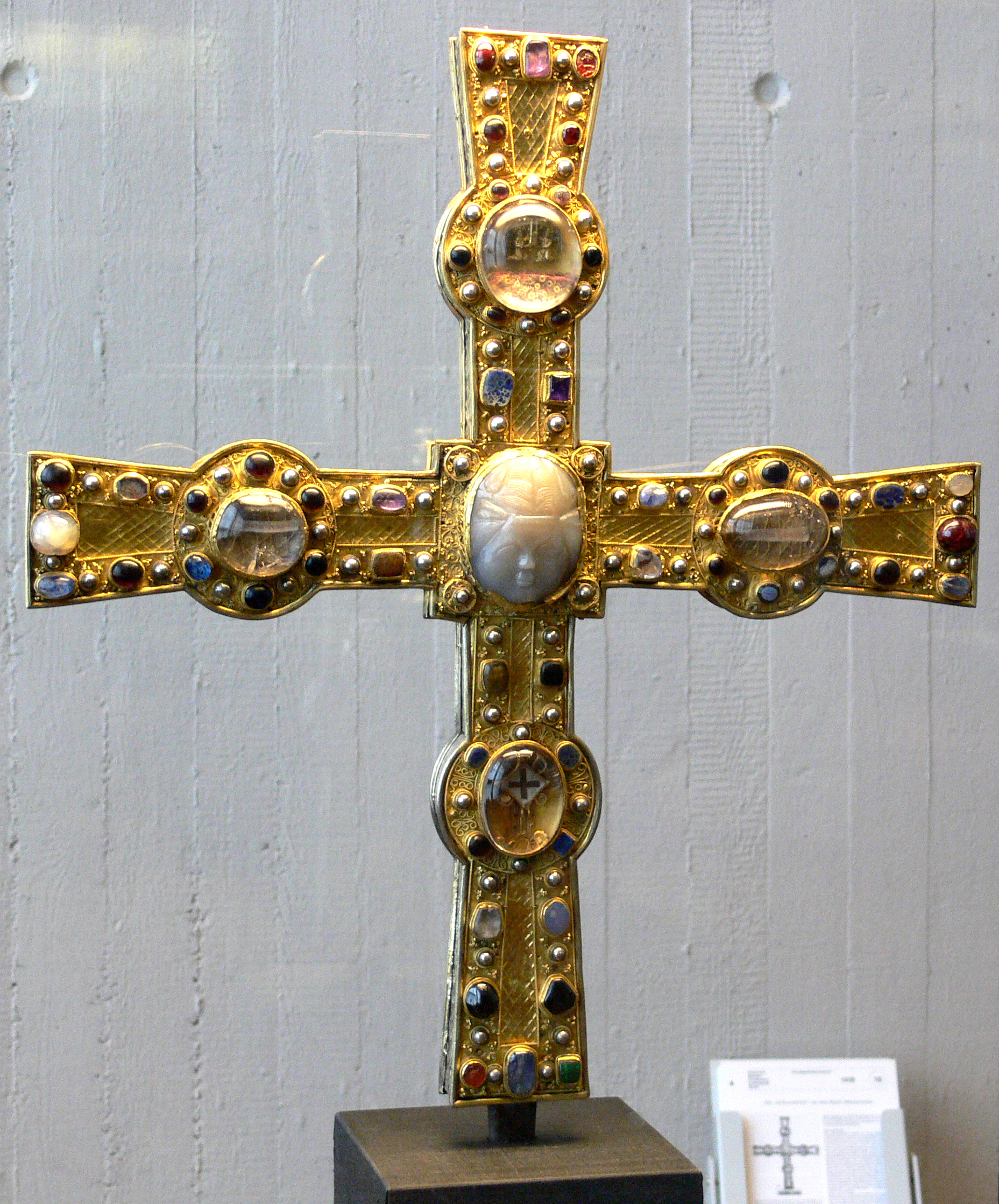
Cross of Henry II exhibited in the Kunstgewerbemuseum Berlin

The cross of Henry was also traditionally assumed to be bequeathed by Emperor Henry II in 1019. Undoubtedly it is a main work of Ottonian goldsmithing. Made of golden sheet metal covering a core of oak wood, it is 51 cm high and 46 cm wide. The cross bears five large gems. The central one is an ancient Roman "phalera", while the gems on the arms of the cross are rock crystals covering reliquaries. The back side displays a golden crucifix which probably dates from the year 1437/38. Today it is held by the Kunstgewerbemuseum Berlin.

== Exhibitions ==
In 2001/2002, all extant and transportable objects of the treasury were reunited as part of international exhibition. The exhibition was presented in New York, Basel and Munich.
