= Trier Adventus Ivory =

Artwork within the Trier cathedral treasury, Germany

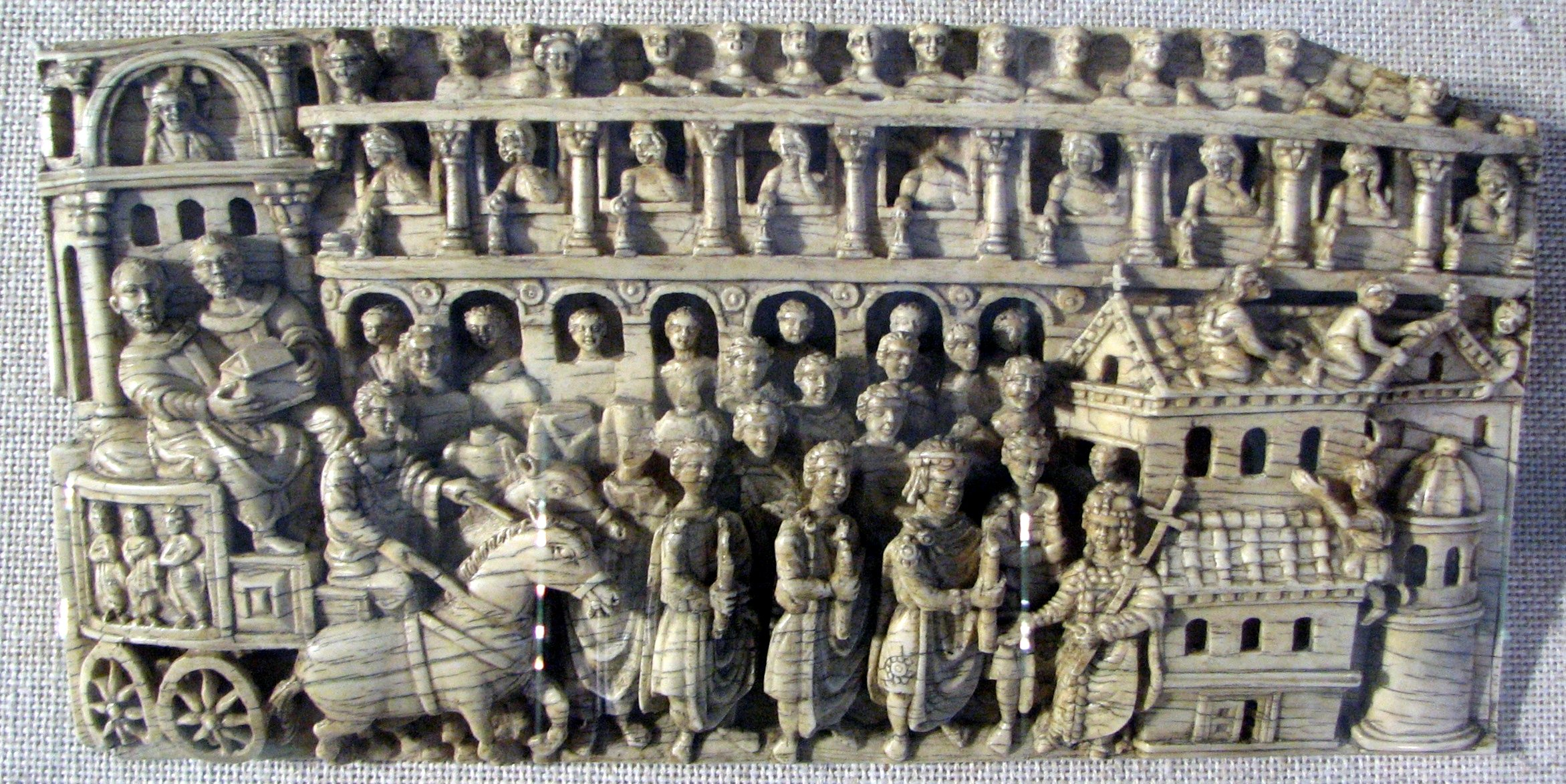
The Trier Adventus Ivory

The Trier Adventus Ivory or the Translation of Relics Ivory is an artwork in the Trier Cathedral Treasury in Trier, Germany. The 4th-century relief is a piece of ivory carving from the Byzantine Empire. It was acquired by the Cathedral of Trier in 1844. The work is considered to be an "enigma of Early Byzantine art" and scholars have debated over the ivory's date of manufacture, its original location, and who is depicted. The panel is relatively intact aside from minimal damage to the top right and bottom left corners and some figures having lost their heads.

== Overview ==
The Trier Ivory is thought to have been intended to be read from left to right and depict what is known as an adventus ceremony, a celebratory parade of a visiting emperor accompanied by senior ecclesiastical figures, and sometimes by holy relics. The visit of an emperor would have been an important event for a city, which makes it a commonly recreated scene.

=== Description ===
At the center and slightly to the right is an emperor, crowned and adorned in clothing stylistic of royalty during the Byzantine period, is leading the procession, accompanied by court officials. Two bishops follow the emperor, riding a cart pulled by mules or ponies and holding a box that is believed to carry the holy relic. The figures located in the middle tier archways and upper-tier windows are assumed to be civilians welcoming the emperor and the relic. Looking at the bottom right corner one can see a slightly smaller figure facing the emperor; the figure is that of a woman and it is accepted academically to represent the empress. The empress holds a cross over her left shoulder, while her right hand extends out towards the emperor in a welcoming gesture. Directly behind the empress is a building adorned with crosses at its peaks. This is a basilica where the holy relics will be exhibited. The figure located at the top left-hand corner of the panel directly above the seated bishops is thought to be a representation of Christ.

The identification of the representations of the emperor and empress is debated; some art historians believe the pair could be Constantine the Great and his mother Helena or Justinian II and his wife.

Pulcheria brought many holy relics to churches in Constantinople. The Trier Adventus Ivory has been interpreted as depicting the installation of one of these relics. Historian Kenneth Holum describes the Ivory thus:

"On the Ivory Theodosius wears distinctive costume and inclines slightly forward, but essentially he remains only part of the cortege and thus of the ceremonial context. The direction of the wagon's movement inexorably toward the scene at the right, toward the diminutive woman clothed in the rich costume of an Augusta … in it she deposited the holy relics."

However, this interpretation is disputed, and one recent opinion is that the ivory depicts the later Empress Irene of the eighth century, who sponsored renovation of the Church.

Leslie Brubaker points out that above the bishops in their carriage a sculpture of Christ is shown under an arch. This is taken to be the Chalke Gate, but there is no evidence of it having such an image or icon before 800. It is suggested the ivory was created after the repudiation of iconoclasm at the 787 Council of Nicaea.

=== Dating and style ===
There is much debate among scholars about the exact date in which the ivory was made. The accepted date of the Trier Ivory is around the 4th century A.D. due to the iconographical style of the figures' clothing and the style in which Christ is depicted.

The figures in the ivory are carved outside the background, and individual figures' limbs are also free. This is a frequent characteristic of many early Byzantine ivories. Each figure is also noticeably individual.

== See also ==
- Ivory carving
- Pulcheria
- Cathedral of Trier
