= Pulcheria =

Byzantine empress from 450 to 453

- Augusta
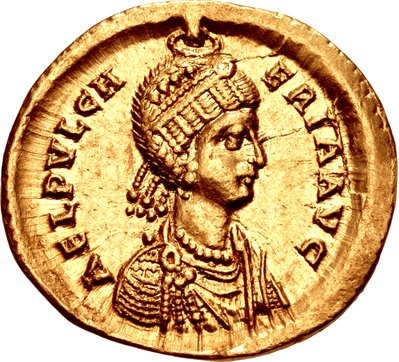
- Solidus of Pulcheria

Roman empress
- Tenure: 25 August 450 – July 453
- Born: 19 January 398 or 399; Constantinople
- Died: July 453 (aged 53–55); Probably Constantinople
- Spouse: Marcian
- House: House of Theodosius
- Dynasty: Theodosian
- Father: Arcadius
- Mother: Aelia Eudoxia
- Religion: Nicene Christianity

Aelia Pulcheria (/ˈiːliə pʌlˈkɪriə/; Ancient Greek: Πουλχερία; 19 January 398 or 399 – July 453) was an Eastern Roman empress who advised her brother, the emperor Theodosius II, during his minority and then became wife to emperor Marcian from November 450 to her death in 453.

She was the second (and oldest surviving) child of Eastern Roman Emperor Arcadius and Empress Aelia Eudoxia. In 414, the fifteen-year old Pulcheria became the guardian of her younger brother Theodosius II and was also proclaimed Augusta. Through her religious devotion and involvement in the contemporary ecclesiastical scene, Pulcheria had significant, though changing, influence during her brother's reign. After Theodosius II died on 26 July 450, Pulcheria married Marcian on 25 November 450, while simultaneously not violating her vow of virginity. She died three years later, in July 453.

Pulcheria influenced the Christian Church and its theological development by being involved in the Council of Ephesus and guiding the Council of Chalcedon, in which the Church ruled on christological issues. The Catholic Church and the Eastern Orthodox Church subsequently recognized her as a saint.

== Early life ==
Pulcheria was born into the Theodosian dynasty, whose Eastern branch in the later Roman Empire ruled from Constantinople. Her parents were the eastern Roman emperor Arcadius and empress Aelia Eudoxia. Pulcheria's older sister, Flaccilla, was born in 397 but probably died young. Her younger siblings were Arcadia (born in 400), the future emperor Theodosius II (born in 401), and Marina (born in 401).

Arcadius' reign experienced a conflict between his wife and the Archbishop of Constantinople John Chrysostom. Sozomen reports that much of the rivalry was based on a silver statue of Eudoxia set up outside the cathedral of Constantinople, Hagia Sophia, which Chrysostom condemned: "The silver statue of the empress … was placed upon a column of porphyry; and the event was celebrated by loud acclamations, dancing, games, and other manifestations of public rejoicing … John declared that these proceedings reflected dishonor on the [C]hurch." Also according to Sozomen, Chrysostom had condemned the empress for her grandiose style in his sermons, which enraged her and resulted in Chrysostom's immediate deposition. Later in life, Pulcheria returned the relics of John Chrysostom and installed them for the church, in gratitude for his pious life.

Eudoxia died in 404, and Arcadius in 408. They left behind four young children, including Theodosius II, then 7 years of age, who had been his father's nominal co-emperor since 402 and was now sole emperor. The praetorian prefect Anthemius at first led government affairs. The imperial chamberlain Antiochus educated Theodosius, but upon reaching adulthood the emperor dismissed him from office.

== Augusta ==
On 4 July 414, Pulcheria took a vow of virginity and was proclaimed Augusta. From then on until Theodosius' adulthood, Pulcheria began to act as her brother and his government's guardian.

Pulcheria was highly esteemed at court. In the Byzantine Senate a bust of her was erected, along with those of other augusti. Pulcheria was a deo coronata and possessed basileia.

=== Vow of virginity ===
When she took the vow of virginity in 414, her sisters followed her example. This was to deter potential suitors. Sozomen explains that:

She devoted her virginity to God, and instructed her sisters to do likewise. To avoid cause of scandal and opportunities for intrigue, she permitted no man to enter her palace. In confirmation of her resolution she took God, the priests, and all the subjects of the Roman empire as witnesses...

It is possible that Pulcheria may have had another motive to remain unmarried, as she would have had to relinquish her power to a potential husband. In addition, the husbands of Pulcheria and her sisters could have wielded overbearing influence on their young brother, or even posed a threat to him.

Increasingly, the imperial palace assumed a monastic tone more so than the previous regime. Sozomen describes the pious ways of Pulcheria and her sisters in his Ecclesiastical History:

They all pursue the same mode of life; they are sedulous in their attendance in the house of prayer, and evince great charity towards strangers and the poor…and pass their days and their nights together in singing the praises of God.

Rituals within the imperial palace included chanting and reciting passages of sacred scripture and fasting twice per week. The sisters relinquished luxurious jewelry and apparel, which most women of the imperial court wore.

=== Minority of Theodosius ===
Pulcheria provided many instructions necessary for Theodosius to be a successful emperor when he would come of age. According to Sozomen, Pulcheria's training of Theodosius included good deportment, manner of speech, horsemanship, and how to don clothes. However, as adult, Theodosius was accused by some historians of providing lackluster leadership.

Philostorgius says she handled imperial rescripts for her brother during his minority. Sozomen states that not only did Pulcheria train her brother in the duties and customs of imperial office but governed the state until her brother reached adulthood. This claim is taken seriously by some modern historians, while other historians argue that it was the collective advisory body, rather than Pulcheria, that directed the government.

=== War with Persia ===
Pulcheria's time as Augusta also was marked by war and ongoing conflict with Sassanid Persia. The imperial court called for war against Persia when the Persian king Yazdegerd I executed a Christian bishop who had destroyed a Zoroastrian altar. Theodosius sent troops into battle, described by Socrates as "ready to do anything for the sake of Christianity." Though the war was inconclusive, a surviving inscription declares that Theodosius was able to conquer through his sisters' vows of virginity. Theodosius thus made his sister's virginity a tool of war propaganda, and because of her vow to be faithful only to God, the hand of God would help Roman troops in battle against Persia.

=== Relationship with Aelia Eudocia ===
The relationship between Pulcheria and Aelia Eudocia, Theodosius II's wife, was strained. The two women over the years had developed a rivalry, possibly based on their different backgrounds and religious beliefs. Eudocia was originally named Athenais and was born in Athens to a Greek philosopher and professor of rhetoric. According to a later source, when her father died, he left her with little means, only 100 solidi (gold coins). She visited her aunt in Constantinople out of desperation. On 7 June 421, Theodosius married Athenais, and her name was changed to Eudocia. Opinions differ as to whether Pulcheria really recommended Eudocia to her brother, a claim made by John Malalas. The rivalry between the two women was posed by some scholars to have been motivated by Eudocia's envy of Pulcheria's power in court.

Centuries later, Theophanes the Confessor wrote that Eudocia and the chief minister, the eunuch Chrysaphius, convinced Theodosius to rely less on his sister's influence and more on that of his new wife. This caused Pulcheria in the late 440s to leave the imperial palace and live in "Hebdomon, a seaport seven miles from Constantinople." However, Eudocia had already left Constantinople for Jerusalem, and the chronology of her departure does not support this version of the events.

== Wife of Marcian ==
While hunting on horseback in 450, Theodosius II fell from his horse and injured his spine; he died two days later. What exactly happened in government during the interregnum is unclear. It is speculated by some historians that Pulcheria reigned over the empire alone for about one month after the death of Theodosius, which may have primarily consisted of arranging the public funeral of Theodosius, while another theory believes that the government was under tense negotiations between different parties. As the deceased emperor lacked surviving male children, Pulcheria could bestow dynastic legitimacy on an outsider by marrying him. She honoured her vow of virginity despite entering a legitimate marriage. Allying with the prominent general Aspar, she married Marcian, a tribune and close associate of Aspar. Marcian's origins were of low status in comparison to those of previous emperors but he was a Roman, which made him eligible for the throne. One condition of the marriage was that Marcian obey and respect Pulcheria's vow of virginity, which he did. In order for the marriage to not seem scandalous to the Roman state, the church proclaimed that "Christ himself sponsored the union and it therefore should not provoke shock or unjustified suspicions." Marcian ascended the throne on 25 August 450. After their marriage, Pulcheria and Marcian had Chrysaphius killed.

== Ecclesiastical Policy ==
=== Church and Judaism ===
Pulcheria was influential in ecclesiastical policies. In a letter from Pope Leo I, a contemporary of Pulcheria, he complimented her great piety and despisal of the errors of heretics.

Pulcheria and Theodosius potentially held anti-Jewish sentiments, which may have contributed to laws against Jewish worship in the capital. Before the reign of Theodosius II, synagogues were treated as private property and protected by the imperial government. Theodosius enacted a law that forbade the construction of synagogues and required the destruction of those in existence. Theodosius also ordered the execution of a group of Jews after strife among Christians emerged in Palestine.

Pulcheria was famous for her philanthropy. According to Sozomen, she erected many churches and buildings for the poor in and around Constantinople. Pulcheria's building projects in Constantinople were so vast that the eleventh region of the city was named the Pulcherianai. As well as contributing new churches and districts to the city, Pulcheria contributed significantly to the Christian Church by reinstating bishops who were dismissed and returning the remains of others, such as Flavian, as relics of the church.

=== First Council of Ephesus ===
The First Council of Ephesus, held in 431 in Theodosius's reign, involved two rival bishops: Nestorius, who was Archbishop of Constantinople, and Cyril, the Patriarch of Alexandria. The dispute grew from their disagreement over the nature of Christ.

Nestorius advocated diminishing the influence of the doctrine of the "Theotokos", i.e. "Mother of God", in the church. This conflicted with the religious beliefs of Pulcheria, as she was a virgin empress, and a rivalry between them ensued, during which Nestorius launched a smear campaign against her. Nestorius also tried to remove Pulcheria's image and her altar cloth from the altar, against her wishes. However, Pulcheria and her allies, including Eusebius of Dorylaeum, struck back by launching a campaign against Nestorius. Meanwhile, Cyril had already publicly condemned Nestorius and wrote to the imperial court stating that the doctrine of the "Theotokos" was correct. Theodosius and his advisors decided to hold a council, thereby allowing Nestorius an opportunity to vindicate himself.

However, the Council, teeming with Cyril's allies, condemned Nestorius' position. Nestorians, who were unable to take part in the previous council, held their own council to denounce Cyril. The emperor first tried to find a middle ground but eventually favored Cyril. The title of "Theotokos" was decreed as orthodox. He also deposed Nestorius and banished him to a monastery in Antioch. Thus, Pulcheria's campaign against Nestorius was successful, but ecclesiastical controversies did not stop there.

=== Second Council of Ephesus ===
In 449, Christological debates flared up again. Theodosius summoned another council to Ephesus to resolve the disputes. At this council, Pope Leo I was the primary advocate for Pulcheria's claims of the doctrine, and he "…forcefully intervened, sending a Tome, a long letter, to Archbishop Flavian of Constantinople, in which he argued for the two natures, but questioned the legality of the recent condemnation of a certain Eutyches for denying them. At this the party of Dioscorus, Cyril's successor in Alexandria was able to overturn the situation, whereupon Leo asked for a second council, calling that [council in] Ephesus the Robber Council."

During this council, Flavian was beaten and died from his injuries. He was later declared a saint and martyr.

=== Council of Chalcedon ===
Two years later, Pulcheria and Marcian summoned the Council of Chalcedon, attended by 452 bishops. It condemned the doctrines of both Nestorius and Eutyches, developed the doctrines of Cyril and Pope Leo I into one, and it declared the doctrine of the "Theotokos" orthodox. It also reversed the decision of the second Council of Ephesus and denounced it as 'Robber Council'. According to historian Averil Cameron, the Council of Chalcedon "…developed and clarified the creed of Nicaea, according to which God was Father, Son and Holy Spirit, by further proclaiming that Christ was at all times after the Incarnation fully God and fully human." Pulcheria and Marcian were both hailed as the "new Constantine" and "new Helena" at the council. From this council grew an irreconcilable gulf between Chalcedonians, those who upheld the council's decision, and Miaphysites, who opposed it.

Pulcheria devoted the last years of her life to the "Theotokos", and had three churches in Constantinople dedicated to the Virgin Mary: the Monastery of the Panagia Hodegetria, the Church of St. Mary of Blachernae, and the Chalkoprateia.

== Death and veneration ==
Pulcheria died in 453, but the specific day is unknown. She probably died in Constantinople. Her death shocked the people of Constantinople, since she had formed a bond with the city's inhabitants. In her will, she distributed her remaining wealth to the poor.

After her death, she was declared a saint by the church, which is today the Roman Catholic and Eastern Orthodox churches.

== In art ==
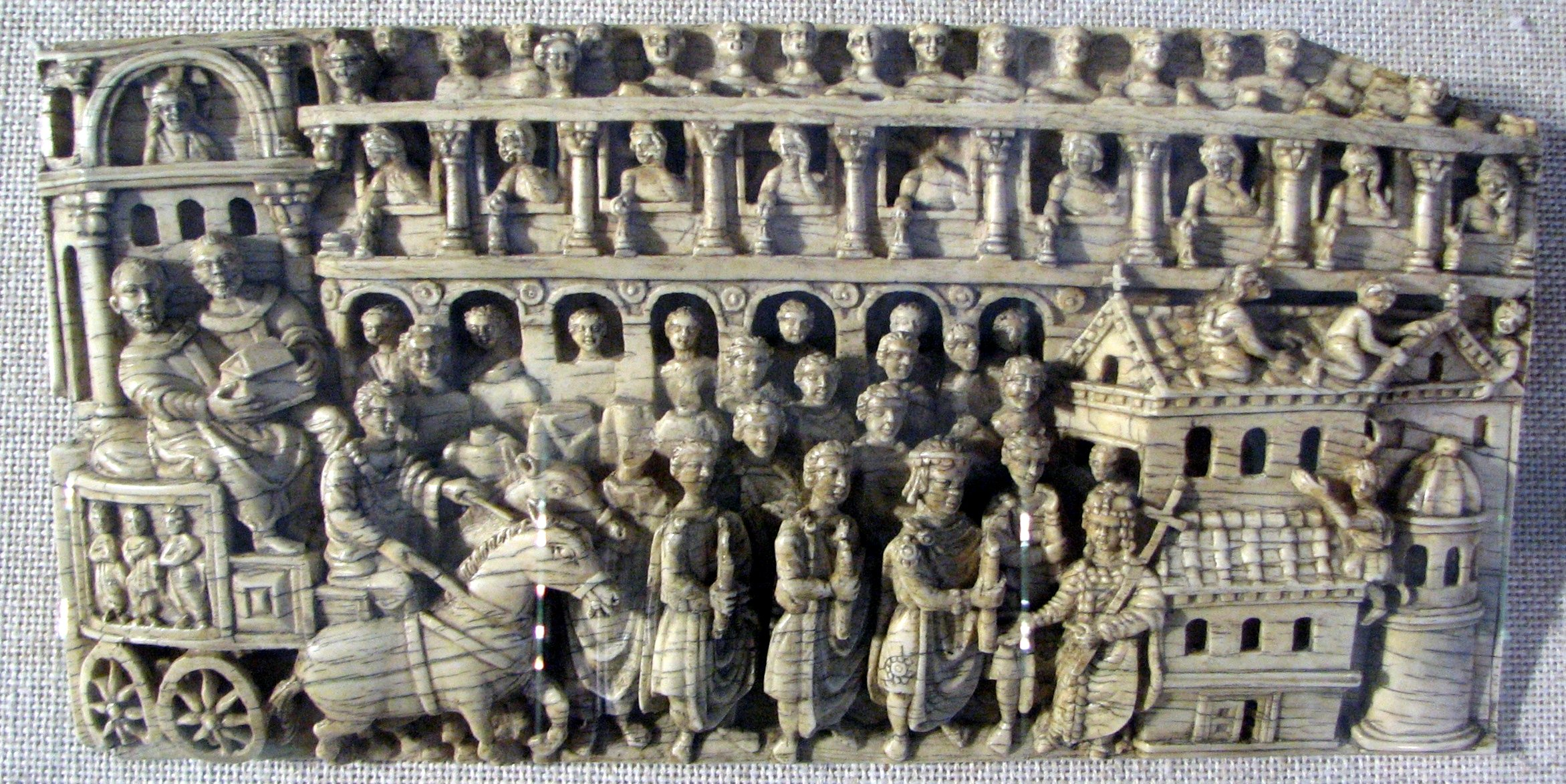
The Trier Ivory, representing a procession with royal figures theorized to depict Theodosius II and Pulcheria.

Pulcheria brought many holy relics to churches in Constantinople. The Trier Adventus Ivory, now housed in the treasury of Trier Cathedral, Germany, has been interpreted as depicting the installation of one of these relics. Historian Kenneth Holum describes the Ivory thus: "On the Ivory Theodosius wears distinctive costume and inclines slightly forward, but essentially he remains only part of the cortege and thus of the ceremonial context. The direction of the wagon's movement inexorably toward the scene at the right, toward the diminutive woman clothed in the rich costume of an Augusta … in it she deposited the holy relics."

However, this interpretation is disputed, and another opinion is that the ivory shows the later Empress Irene of the eighth century, who sponsored renovation of the church.

== See also ==
- Icon of the Hodegetria
- List of Byzantine emperors
- List of Roman and Byzantine Empresses
- Monastery of the Panaghia Hodegetria

== Notes ==
Pulcheria House of Theodosius Born: 19 January 398/399 Died: July 453
Royal titles
Preceded by Aelia Eudocia	Roman Empress consort 450–453	Succeeded by Verina
