= Saint Gangolf's Church (Trier) =

Roman Catholic church in Trier, Germany

Coordinates: 49°45′22″N 6°38′27″E

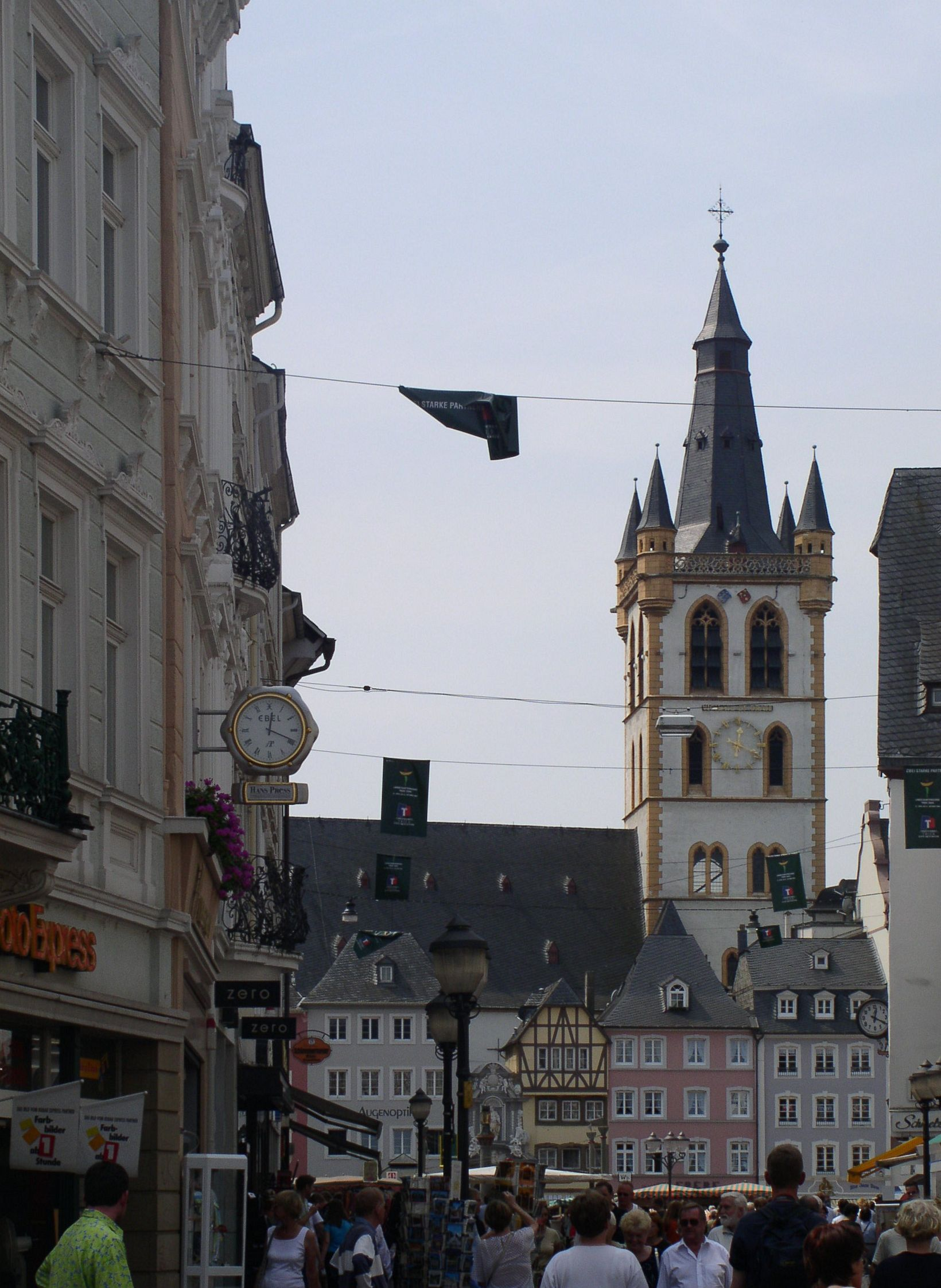

St. Gangolf's Church is a Roman Catholic church in Trier, Germany. It is dedicated to St. Gangulphus, annd known for its bells. After Trier Cathedral, it is the second oldest and second tallest church building in the city.
