= Rospigliosi =

Rospigliosi (Italian pronunciation: [rospiʎˈʎoːzi, -oːsi]) may refer to:

== Places ==
- Rospigliosi Castle, Lima, Peru
- Palazzo Rospigliosi, several palaces in Italy

== People ==
- Fernando Rospigliosi (born 1947), President of the Congress of Peru from 2025 to 2026
- Giuseppe Niccolò Rospigliosi (b. 1525, fl. 1550), known as Vicentino, Italian painter and wood engraver
- Rospigliosi family, including:
  - Felice Rospigliosi (1639–1688), Italian Roman Catholic cardinal
  - Filippo Rospigliosi (born 1942), 11th Prince Rospigliosi and 12th Earl of Newburgh
  - Francesco Rospigliosi Pallavicini (1828–1887), Italian politician
  - Giacomo Rospigliosi (1628–1684), Italian Roman Catholic cardinal
  - Giulio Rospigliosi (1600–1669), head of the Catholic Church as Pope Clement IX

== Other uses ==
- Retrophyllum rospigliosii, a species of conifer in the family Podocarpaceae
- Rospigliosi Music Collection, a collection of musical documents in Pistoia, Italy
- Rospigliosi Cup, a decorative ornament in gold and enamel
