= Palazzo Rospigliosi =

Two branches of the Rospigliosi family had several independent palaces in Italy, which include:

- Palazzo Pallavicini-Rospigliosi, Rome
- Palazzo Rospigliosi a Ripa del Sale, presently Diocesan Museum and Museo Clemente Rospigliosi, Pistoia
- Palazzo Rospigliosi a Via del Duca, birthplace of Clement IX, Pistoia
