= Gemignani =

Family name

Gemignani is an Italian surname, which can be equally written as Geminiani, Gimignani or Giminiani; it belongs to an Italian noble family, whose origins are dated back to medieval Tuscany, and especially in the town of Lucca. The name is derived as a patronymic or plural form of the personal name Gemignano ( from the Late Latin Geminianus, a derivative of geminus, meaning twin). Probably the name derived from the name of Saint Geminianus or the town of San Gimignano.

The family coat of arms figures a red Fleur-de-lis, above three mountains, on a silver background.

== Notable family members ==
- Francesco Geminiani, composer and musician, born in Lucca, in 1680;
- Giacinto Gimignani, painter, born in Pistoia in 1611;
- Lodovico Gimignani, son of Giacinto, and painter as well as his father;
- Alberto Gemignani, who served the Queen of Hungary in the 18th century;
- Valmore Gemignani, sculptor, born in Carrara in 1878 and working in Florence;
- Raphaël Géminiani, cyclist and good friend of Fausto Coppi, born in Clermont-Ferrand (France) in 1925;
- Paul Gemignani, American musical director
