= Charles Truman =

Art historian and curator (1949–2017)

- Charles Truman in 2011
- Born: 5 April 1949; Stratton Audley, Oxfordshire
- Died: 10 February 2017 (aged 67); London, England
- Occupations: Art historian and curator
- Notable work: The Thyssen-Bornemisza Collection: Renaissance Jewellery, Gold Boxes and Objets de Vertu; The Wallace Collection Catalogue of Gold Boxes
- Spouse: Laura C. H. Green (m. 1984)
- Children: Louise and Harry

Charles Henry Truman, FSA (5 April 1949 – 10 February 2017), was an art historian and a leading authority on gold boxes.

== Biography ==
=== Early years ===
Born at Stratton Audley in Oxfordshire, "Charlie", as he was widely known in the art world, was the son of Edward Kenneth Truman and Dorothy Mary Truman (née Harris). His father was a solicitor as was his father before him.

He attended Marlborough College and then after a summer course at Indiana University embarked upon a degree in law at the University of Kent.

=== Career ===
Although expected to follow in his father's footsteps, Truman chose to forge a very different career in the art world. He soon abandoned his studies at Kent and thanks to an inheritance from his maternal grandfather, was able to enrol for an internship in the Department of Furniture and Woodwork at the Victoria and Albert Museum in 1969. In 1971, he transferred to the Department of Metalwork. He was subsequently appointed Assistant Keeper in the Department of Ceramics in 1977.

In 1984, he was headhunted by Christie's to run the firm's London Silver Department, together with the Russian Department and the Department of Objects of Vertu. He was appointed a director of Christie's, and of Christie's Education the following year. Amongst the great pieces which passed through his hands was the Portland Gold Font, 1797–8, from the workshop of Paul Storr, now in the British Museum.

In 1991 he moved to run the Antiques Department at Asprey before establishing himself as an independent dealer. One very pivotal moment in his career while at Asprey's was his negotiating the sale of the silver frames of three crowns once worn by British sovereigns. They are now on display at the Tower of London.

With the antique dealer Lucy Burniston he set up the firm of C. & L. Burman (Works of Art) Ltd in 2000 as an antique dealership and art consultancy. Until its dissolution in 2010, the firm exhibited at the Grosvenor House, Olympia and BADA fairs in London, and at antiques fairs in New York and Palm Beach.

At the time of his death Truman was working as an independent dealer and consultant for works of art, particularly in silver and gold, advising private collectors, museums and heritage groups. His special areas of expertise were gold boxes, Renaissance jewellery, French porcelain and also glass,

Truman was formerly chairman of the British Antique Dealers' Association, a Fellow of the Society of Antiquaries, a Liveryman of the Goldsmiths’ Company, a former member of the Antique Plate Committee of the Goldsmiths' Company, a past chairman of the Silver Society, and a member of the French Porcelain Society, the Glass Circle, the Furniture History Society and the Society of Jewellery Historians.

=== Private life ===
He married Laura Green in 1984.

=== Honours ===
Charles Truman was appointed a Fellow of the Society of Antiquaries and a Liveryman of the Worshipful Company of Goldsmiths.

== Writings ==
His contribution to the literature of decorative art history was substantial. He published on precious metalwork from early on in his career, acknowledging his debt of gratitude to the pioneering works of Kenneth Snowman on Fabergé and on gold boxes. By the age of twenty-six Truman himself was already becoming an authority on gold boxes, contributing significantly to the book The James A. de Rothschild Collection: Gold Boxes and Miniatures (1975).

His article "Reinhold Vasters, The Last of the Goldsmiths", published in Connoisseur in March 1979, dealing with fake Renaissance jewellery and works of art by the Aachen maker, reflected an important area of concern in his work as scholar and later as dealer. With Anna Somers Cocks, he co-authored The Thyssen-Bornemisza Collection: Renaissance Jewellery, Gold Boxes and Objets de Vertu (London, 1984). The first volume of his book The Gilbert Collection of Gold Boxes, was published in 1991 by the Los Angeles County Museum of Art (LACMA). His edition of The Sotheby's Concise Encyclopaedia of Silver came out soon after in 1993. The second volume of The Gilbert Collection of Gold Boxes was published in London in 1999, the year before the Rosalinde and Arthur Gilbert Collection as a whole went on display at Somerset House in London. His catalogue of the Renaissance jewellery in the Robert Lehman Collection at the Metropolitan Museum of Art, New York, was published in 2012, and his catalogue raisonné of the gold boxes at the Wallace Collection, London, in 2013.

== Bibliography ==
=== Works of art history ===
Books by Charles Truman, or works to which he contributed:
1972-3

- Encyclopædia Britannica: several micro entries

1975

- With Serge Grandjean, Kirsten Aschengreen Piacenti and Anthony Blunt, The James A. de Rothschild Collection at Waddesdon Manor: Gold Boxes and Miniatures of the Eighteenth Century. Fribourg: Office du Livre (for the National Trust), 1975 ISBN 0707800234 OCLC 2633887

1977

- French Gold Boxes. London: Victoria and Albert Museum, Small Colour Book 16, 1977 ISBN 0112902596 OCLC 877742815

1981

- Princely Magnificence: Court Jewels of the Renaissance, 1500–1630, exh. cat. Victoria and Albert Museum: 14 entries. London: Debrett's Peerage, 1981 ISBN 9780905649429 OCLC 7748357 (main)

1982

- "Vivant Denon and the Sèvres Egyptian Service" in The Sèvres Egyptian Service 1810–12. Catalogue compiled by Charles Truman. Book published to accompany an exhibition held at the Wellington Museum, Apsley House, of the Sèvres Egyptian Service, commissioned by Napoleon and in 1818 donated (after Napoleon's downfall) by the King of France to the Duke of Wellington. London: H.M.S.O. ( V & A Album, No. 1), 1982 ISBN 9780905209241 OCLC 9770889

1984

- Snodin, Michael (ed.) Rococo: Art and Design in Hogarth’s England, exh. cat., 18 entries. London: Trefoil, 1984 ISBN 9780862940461 OCLC 60068617
- With Anna Somers Cocks (gen. ed. Simon de Pury), The Thyssen-Bornemisza Collection: Renaissance Jewels, Gold Boxes and Objets de Vertu. London: Sotheby Publications, 1984 ISBN 9780865650442 OCLC 10723144 ISBN 085667172X OCLC 470123020
- An Introduction to English Glassware to 1900. London: H.M.S.O. (V & A Introductions to the Decorative Arts), 1984 ISBN 9780112904113 OCLC 478310267

1989

- With preface by Philippa Glanville, The Glory of the Goldsmith: Magnificent Gold and Silver from the Al-Tajir Collection. London: Christie, Manson & Woods, 1989 ISBN 9780903432368 OCLC 775322655

1991

- The Gilbert Collection of Gold Boxes. Los Angeles: Los Angeles County Museum of Art, 1991 ISBN 9780810933644 OCLC 24467891
- "Silver" in Battie, David (ed.) The Encyclopaedia of Antiques: An Illustrated Guide to the World of Collecting. Leicestershire: Acropolis Books, 1991 ISBN 9781873762011 OCLC 60221043

1992

- "The Company’s Plate" in Archer, Ian W., A History of the Haberdashers' Company. Chichester: Phillimore & Co Ltd, 1992 ISBN 9780850337983 OCLC 954505373
- Meissen through Three Centuries exh. cat., London: Asprey, 1992

1993

- Ed. Sotheby's Concise Encyclopaedia of Silver. London: Conran Octopus Books, 1993 ISBN 9781850294221 OCLC 317285290; paperback, 1996 ISBN 978-1850297598 OCLC 760885249)

1999

- With Melissa Larner, The Gilbert Collection of Gold Boxes (vol. 2). London: Philip Wilson Publishing, 1999 ISBN 9780856675218

2005

- "Rundell's and Their Gold Box Suppliers" in Hartop, Christopher (ed.), Royal Goldsmiths, The Art of Rundell and Bridge, 1797-1843. Cambridge: John Adamson, 2005 ISBN 978-0-9524322-3-4 OCLC 835594154

2009

- "Some German Gold Boxes in the Wallace Collection" in Annual Handbook. London: British Antique Dealers' Association, 2009/10

2012

- "Jewelry and Precious Objects" in Decorative Arts in the Robert Lehman Collection (vol. XV), New York: Metropolitan Museum, 2012 ISBN 978-1-58839-450-7 OCLC 906822189 (main); Princeton University Press, 2012 ISBN 978-0-691-15490-9, pp. 95–152

2013

- With contributions from Seoyoung Kim and Rebecca Wallis, The Wallace Collection Catalogue of Gold Boxes. London: Wallace Collection, 2013 ISBN 978 0900785 94 8 OCLC 868267383

=== Essays and reviews ===
- "Three Centuries of Continental Silver" Apollo, no. 187, June 1977, pp. 428–32
- "The Master of the Easter Egg - Carl Fabergé" Apollo, July 1977
- "Reinhold Vasters — 'the last of the goldsmiths'?" Connoisseur, vol. 200, no. 805, March 1979, pp. 154–61
- "Emperor, King and Duke - The Sèvres Egyptian Service acquired for the Nation" Connoisseur, vol. 202, no. 813, November 1979, pp. 148–55
- "A St. Cloud Nécessaire de voyage circa 1750" Connoisseur, vol. 203, no. 818, April 1980: pp. 253–5
- "Some elegant gold boxes" Antique Collector, November 1983
- "Elias Russel’s Gold Snuff Box" Goldsmiths' Company Review, 1984
- "Les Boîtes à Prix d’Or" Connaissance des Arts, February 1985
- "Ships on Board" Country Life, 21 December 1989
- "The Glory of the Goldsmith" Christie's Review of the Season, 1990
- "Hilmar Recksten Collection" Antique Collector, January 1991
- "Royal Goldsmiths: The Garrard Heritage" Antique Collector, May 1991
- "New Glass for Old" Country Life, 28 April 1994
- "Silver Predictions: a survey of the silver market" Antique International, June 1994
- "Silver Service; a survey of 18th and 19th century silver for the table" Antique International, March 1995
- "A Saint Cloud price list in the Victoria and Albert Museum" Journal of the French Porcelain Society, (2004)
- Review of Deborah Dependahl Waters, A Handsome Cupboard of Plate (John Adamson, 2012), Silver Studies, 2013
