= Ludovico Gimignani =

Italian painter (1643–1697)

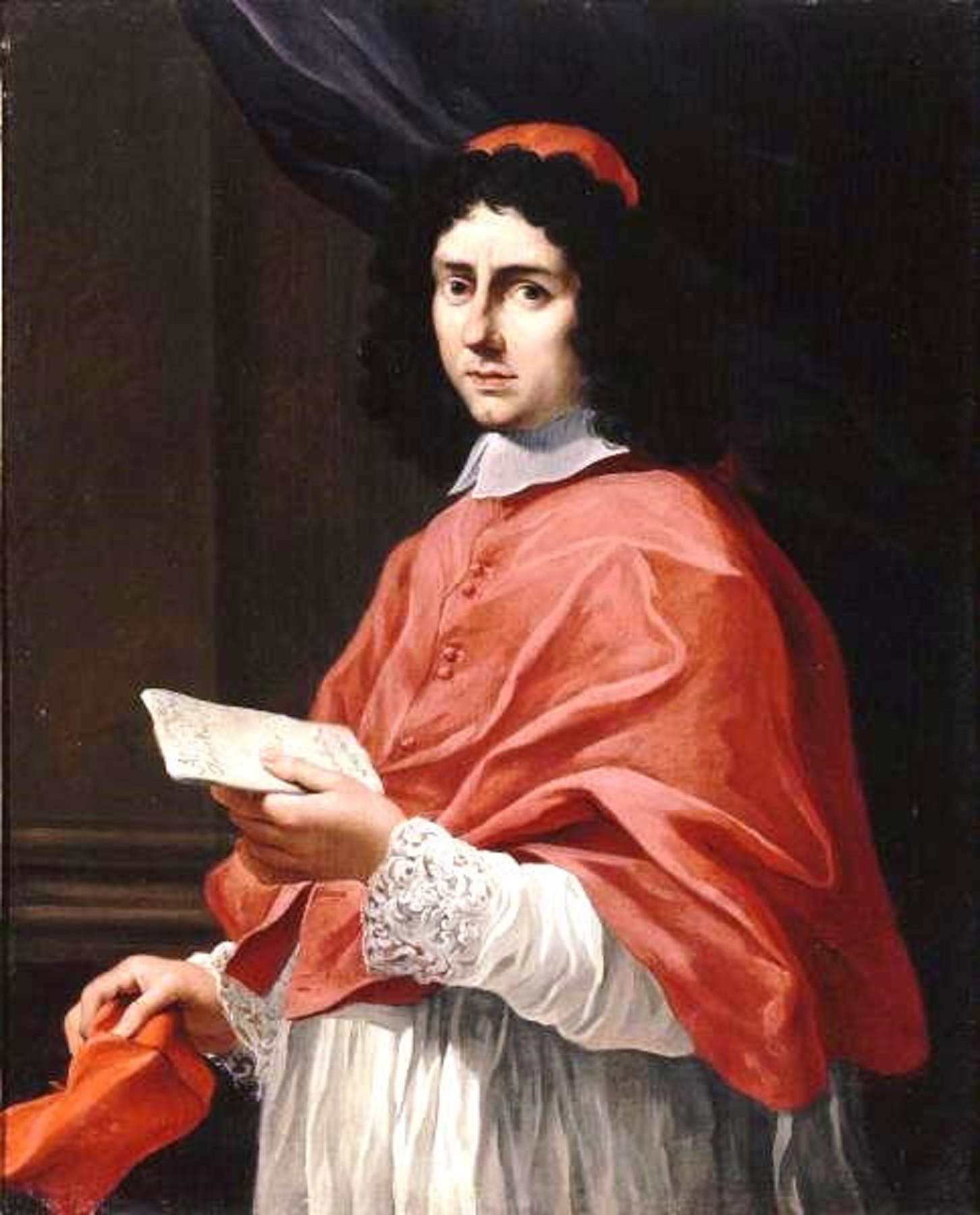
Portrait of Cardinal Felice Rospigliosi

Ludovico Gimignani (1643 – 26 June 1697) was an Italian painter, who is mainly known for his altarpieces for churches in Rome.

== Biography ==
Ludovico was born in Rome as the son of the painter Giacinto (1611–1681). His father was one of the main pupils emerging from the loose "studio" of painters working for Pietro da Cortona and who also received patronage from his fellow Pistoia native, the cardinal Rospigliosi. Ludovico's mother was the daughter of the painter Alessandro Turchi. Ludovico appears to have received encouragement from Gianlorenzo Bernini.

He was very active in painting altarpieces for churches in Rome, including a Baptism of Constantine and a History of San Silvestro for the church of San Silvestro in Capite. He also painted a Guardian Angel for the church of San Crisogono, a portrait of a Boy and a Greyhound in the Palazzo Pallavicini-Rospigliosi in the Quirinal Hill, and an altarpiece for the baptistery in Sant'Andrea delle Fratte. Among his masterpieces is the altarpiece depicting the Miracle of Saint Mary Magdalene de' Pazzi. His father had painted the companion piece for the Temptation; both paintings are found in the second chapel (Chapel of St. Mary Magdalene de' Pazzi, who had been canonized in 1669) on the left of the Carmelite church of Santa Maria in Montesanto. Ludovico also painted the vault frescoes (1685).

In 1672, he joined the Accademia di San Luca, a prestigious association of artists in Rome. He was named curator of the Gallery of the Palazzo Quirinale by pope Alexander VII.

He died in Zagarolo.
