= Rospigliosi Cup =

The Rospigliosi Cup, (so called from the noble Rospigliosi family) sometimes referred to as the Cellini Cup, is a decorative ornament in gold and enamel, previously attributed to Benvenuto Cellini (1500–1571), but now known to be an art forgery, of nineteenth-century manufacture.

The Cup is believed to have been created by Reinhold Vasters, a German goldsmith who worked in Aachen from 1853 to 1890. Vasters is now believed to be the sole author of many pieces that had previously been attributed as masterpieces of Renaissance jewellery.

So closely did Vasters' Rospigliosi Cup resemble Cellini's style, it is unlikely that the truth about the forgery would ever have been known, if Vasters' preliminary sketches had not been found. Vasters was a highly skilled artisan, as well as a master of replicating another artist's style precisely. It was not until the Rospigliosi Cup was taken apart that it became clear that the cup had been assembled in ways that were not available until Vasters' own time.

The Cup is now housed at the Metropolitan Museum of Art, in New York.
