= Giovanni da San Giovanni =

Italian painter (1592–1636)

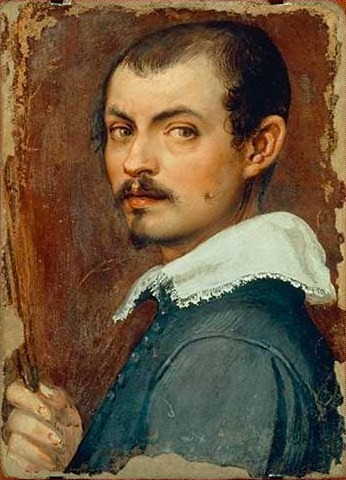
Self portrait of Giovanni

Giovanni da San Giovanni (20 March 1592 – 9 December 1636), also known as Giovanni Mannozzi, was an Italian painter of the early Baroque period, active in Florence.

== Biography ==
Born in San Giovanni Valdarno, he trained under Matteo Rosselli. He is also said to have studied architectural perspective from Giulio Parigi. He traveled to Rome where he admired the fresco painted in 1614 by Guido Reni, depicting the Aurora.

He was soon called back to Florence. Mannozzi started the decoration of the Sala degli Argenti in the Palazzo Pitti and planned decorations at Villa La Petraia. In 1615 he painted two ceiling canvases of Putti Supporting the profile of Michelangelo for the Casa Buonarroti and in the same period frescoed a choir of musician-angels for the dome of the church of the Ognissanti in Florence. He also painted five lunettes showing scenes from the Life of St Francis in the cloister of the Ognissanti. In 1619–1620 he directed the façade decoration of Palazzo dell'Antella in Piazza Santa Croce of Florence.

His masterpiece is said to be frescoes in the chapel of Saint Catherine inside the Palazzo Rospigliosi-Pallavicini in Pistoia. While escaping Florence during the plague, he painted some frescoes in the lunettes in the Santuario della Madonna della Fontenuova in Monsummano Terme. On the left internal wall of the chorus of the church of San Bartolomeo in Cutigliano, is a canvas of Mannozzi's the Circumcision (1620). He painted a fresco cycle on the vault of the Mellini Chapel in Santa Maria del Popolo which displays The Story of Saint Nicholas of Tolentino in 1623–24.

He died in 1636 and was buried in the church of San Pier Gattolino in Florence. His biography was featured by Filippo Baldinucci.

== Gallery ==
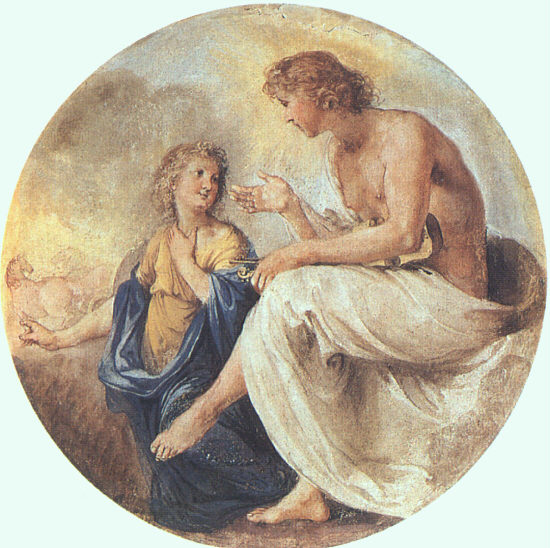
Apollo and Phaëton in the Uffizi Gallery

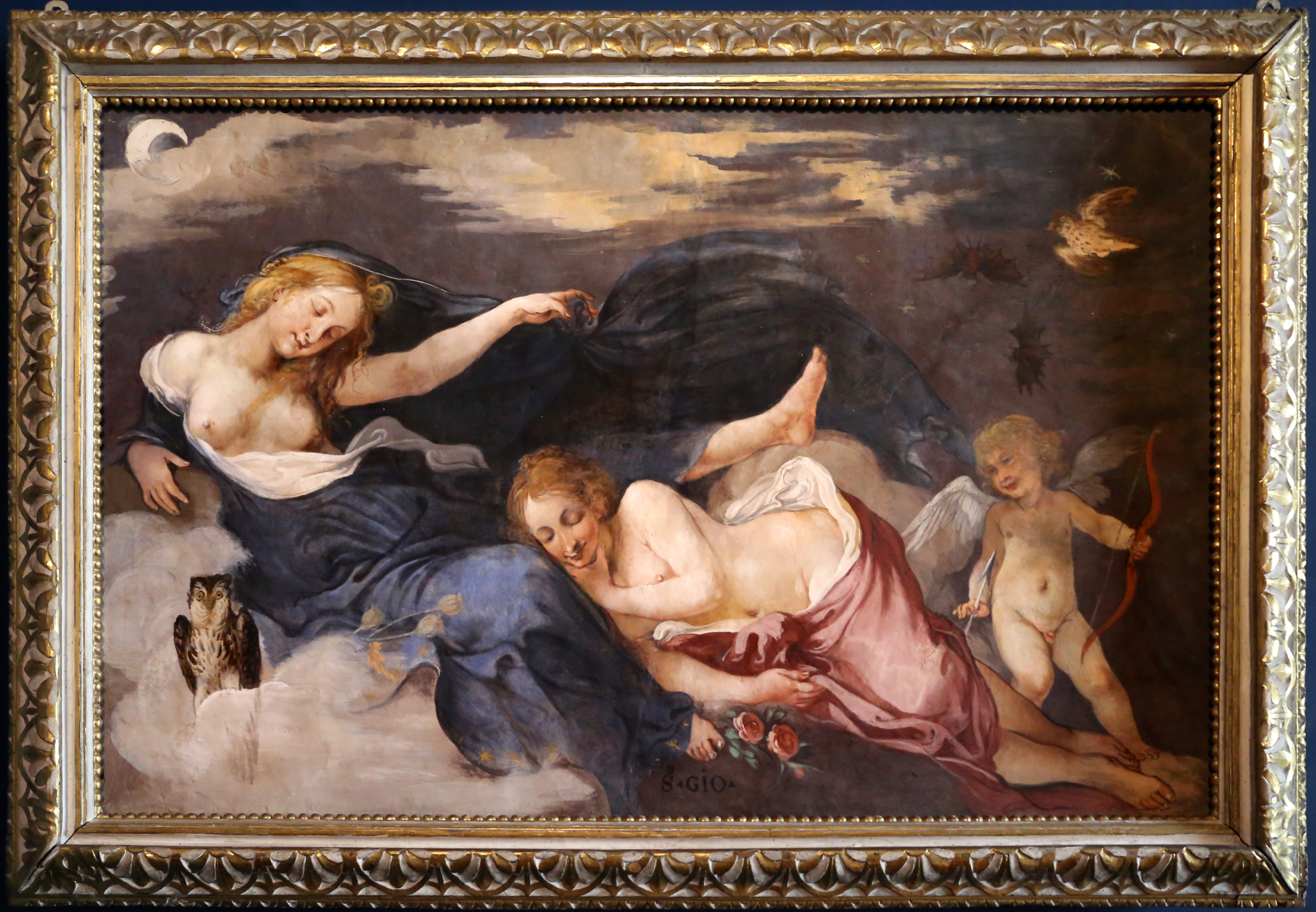
Night, Aurora, and a Cupid (c. 1635)

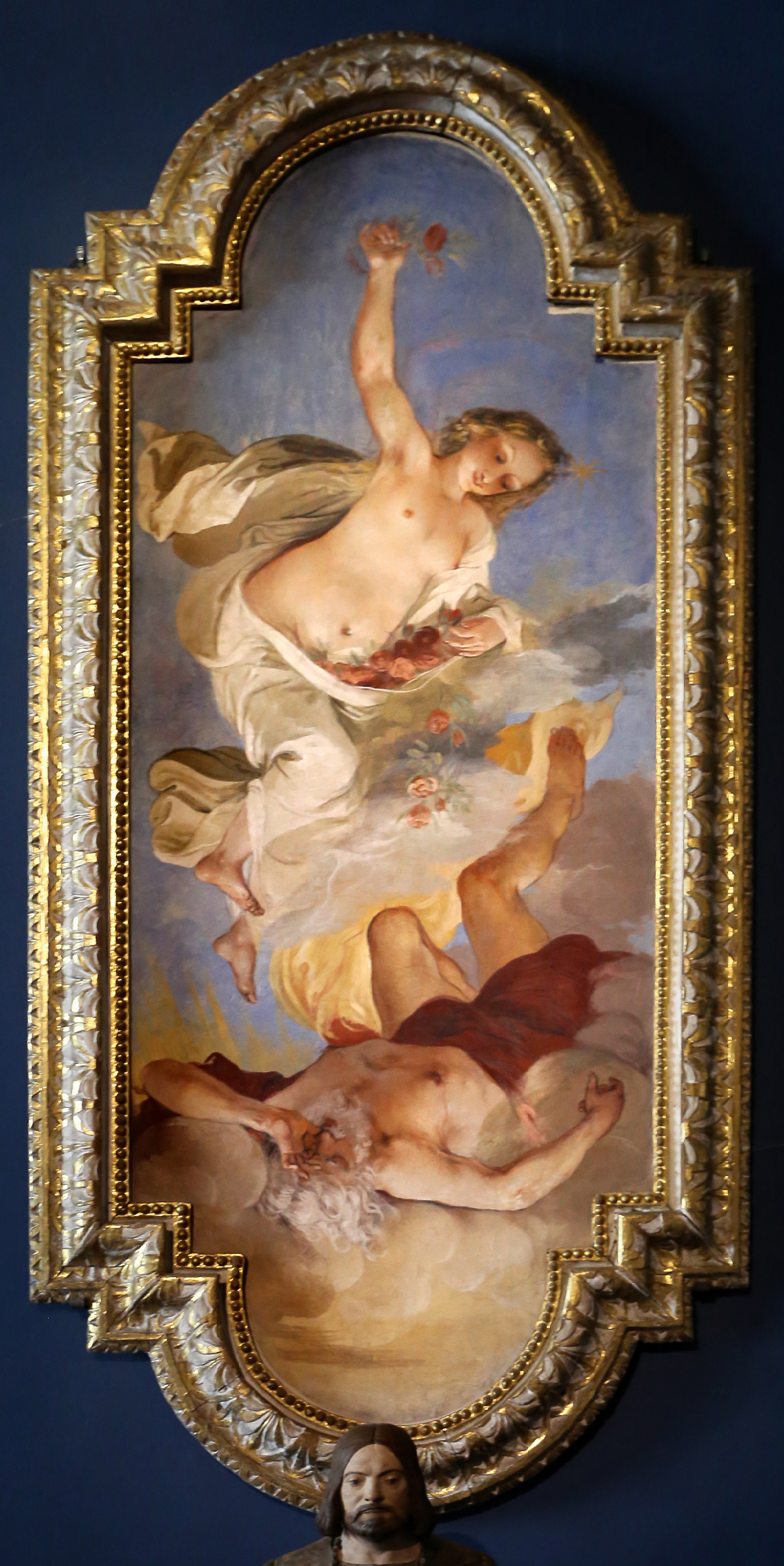
Aurora and Tithonus (c. 1635)

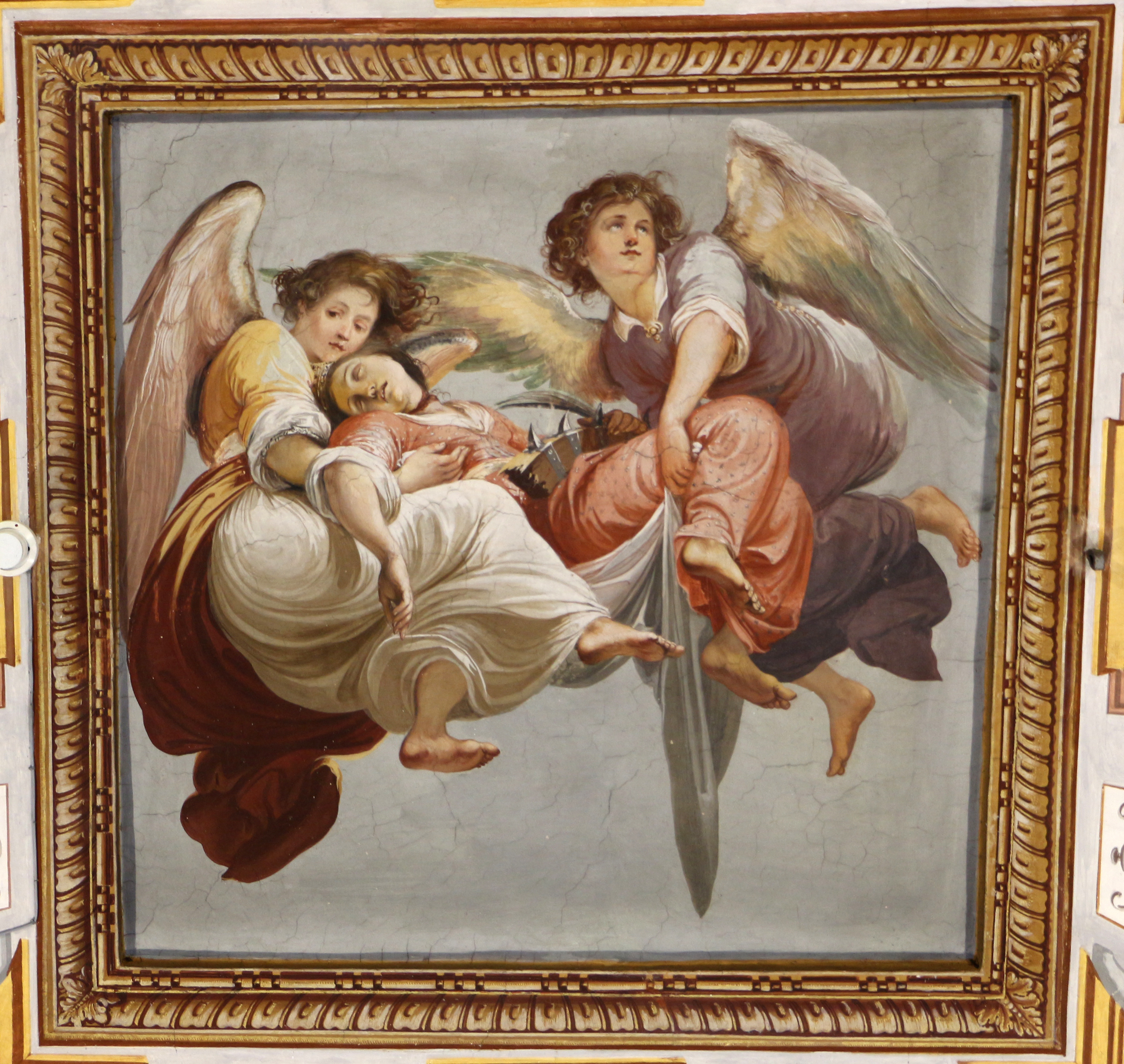
St Catherine transported by Angels

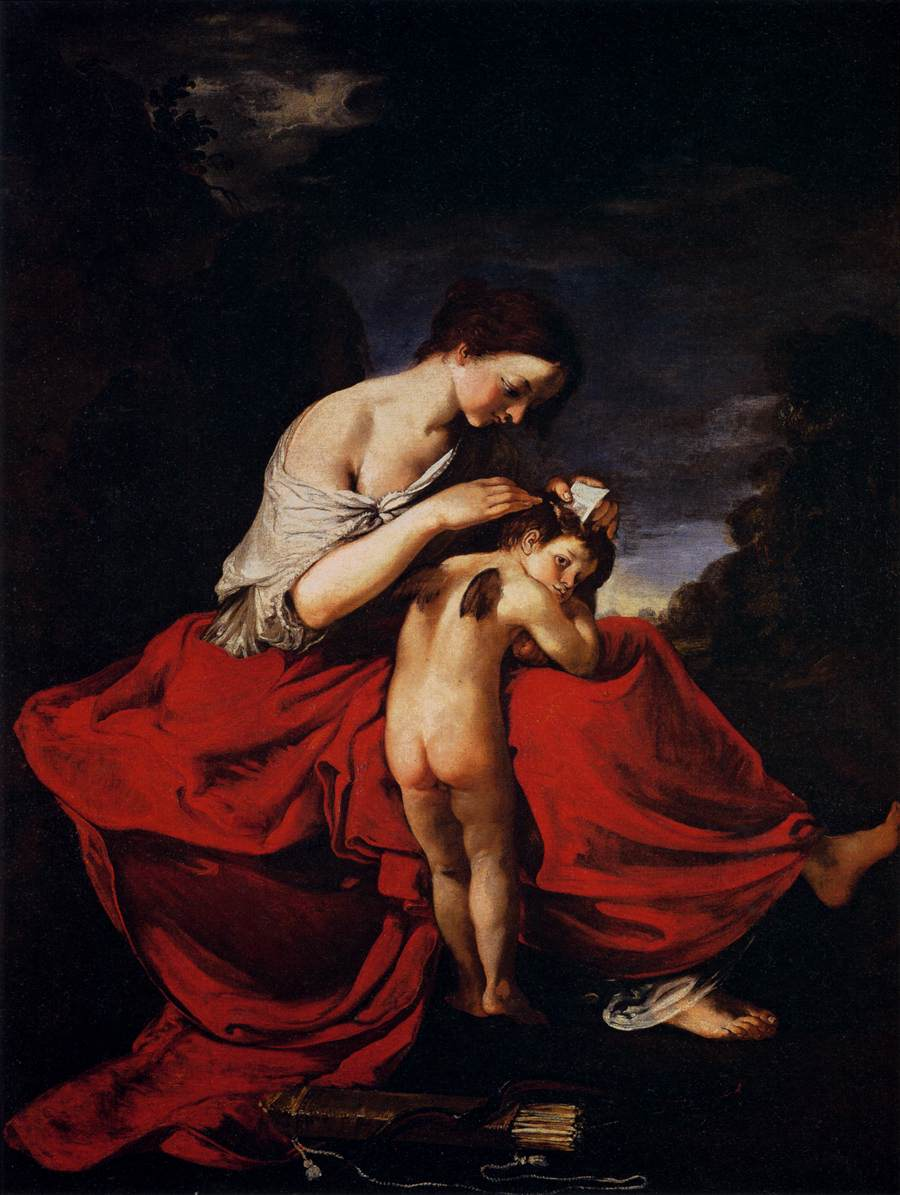
Venus combing Cupid's Hair

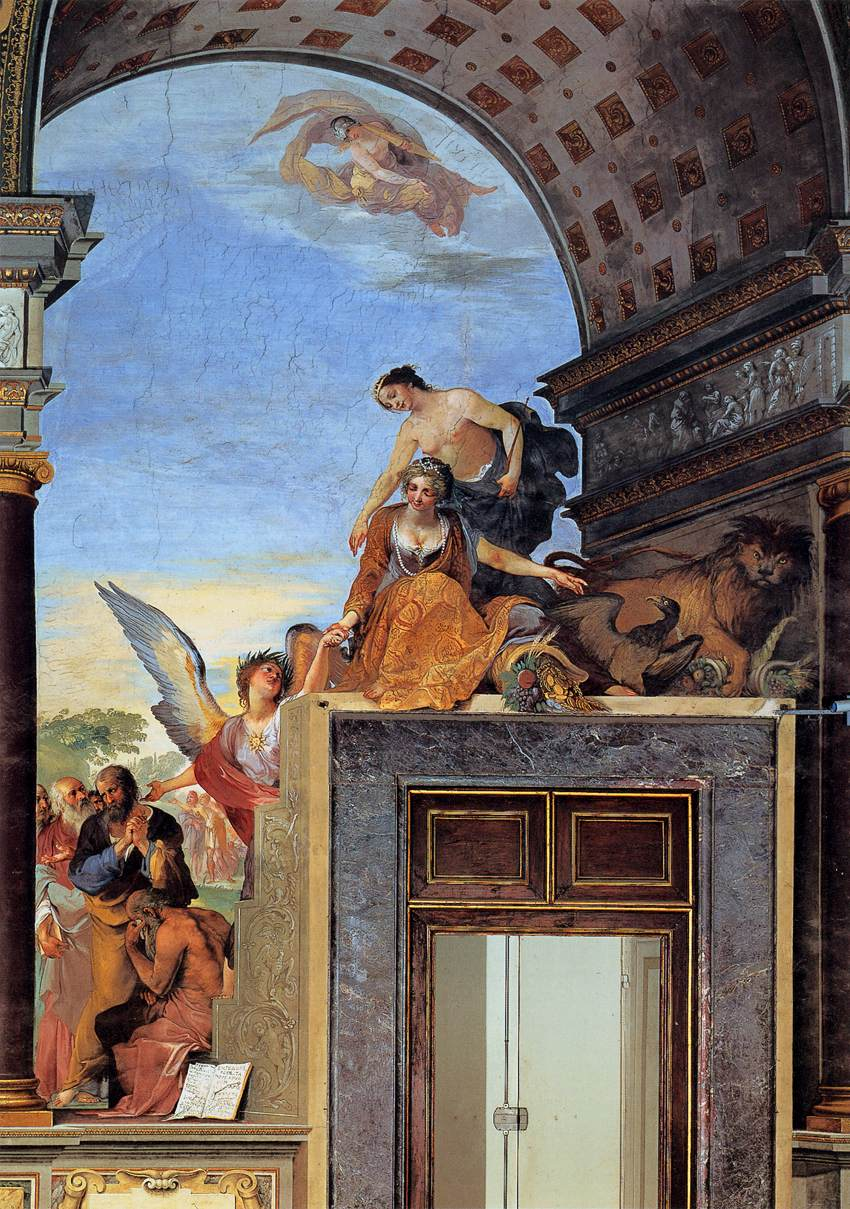
Fame showing Wandering Philosopher to Tuscany and Riches

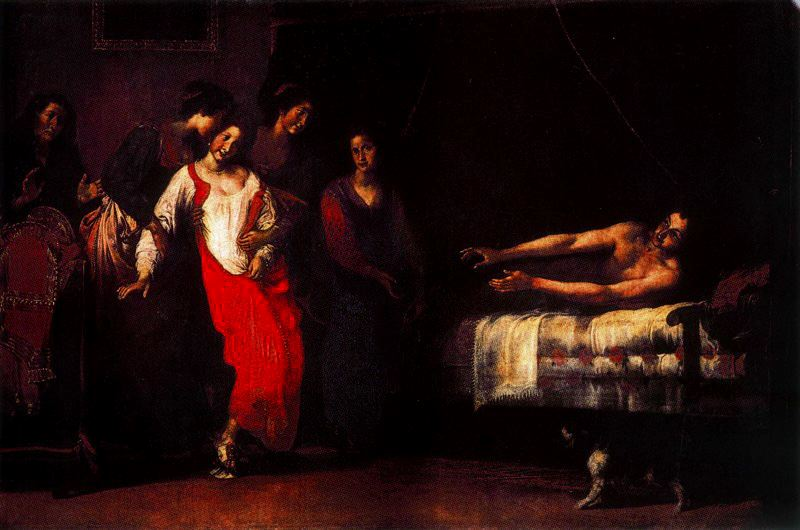
Bridal Night

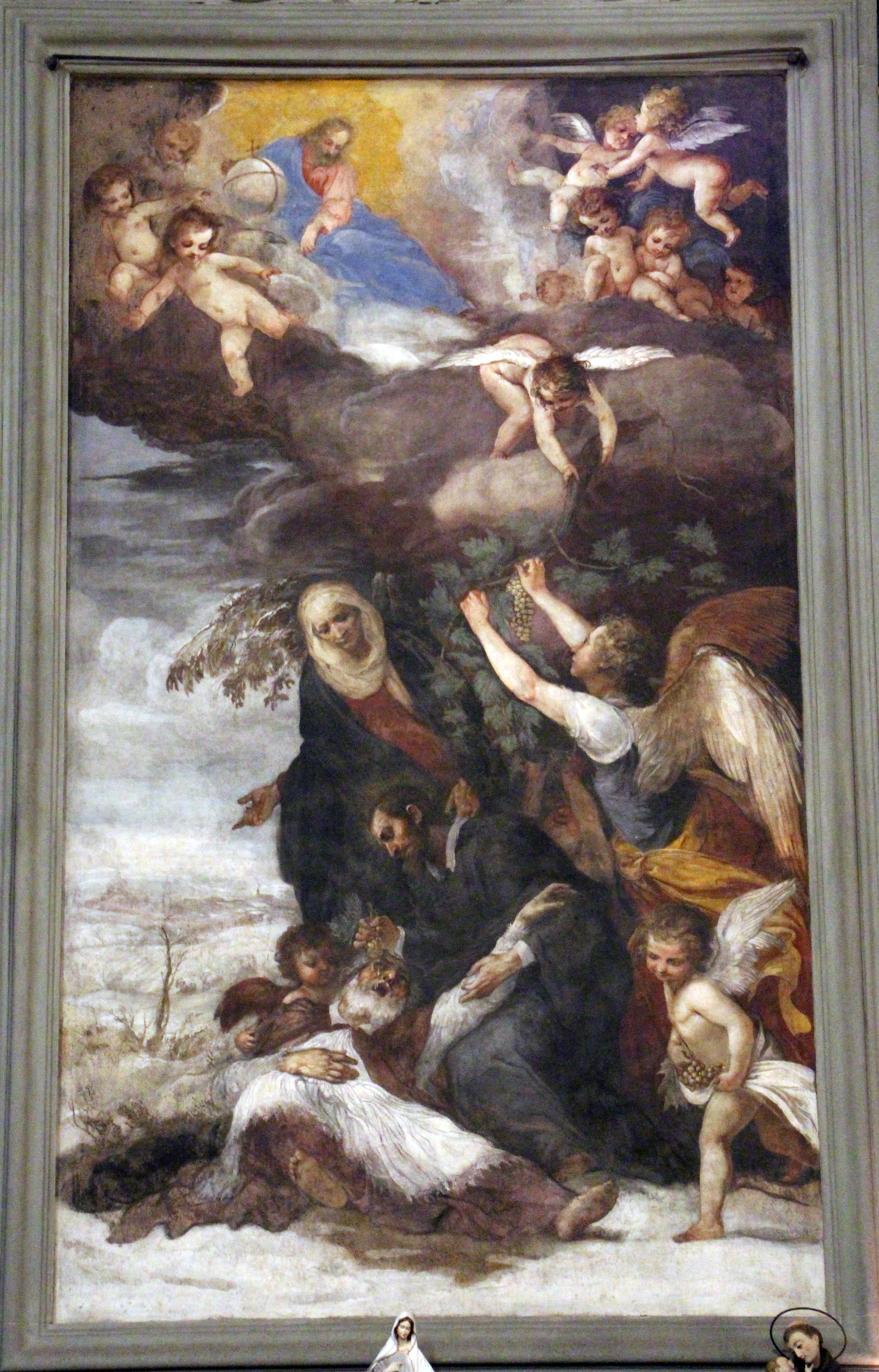
St Felix succors St Maximilian (1636)

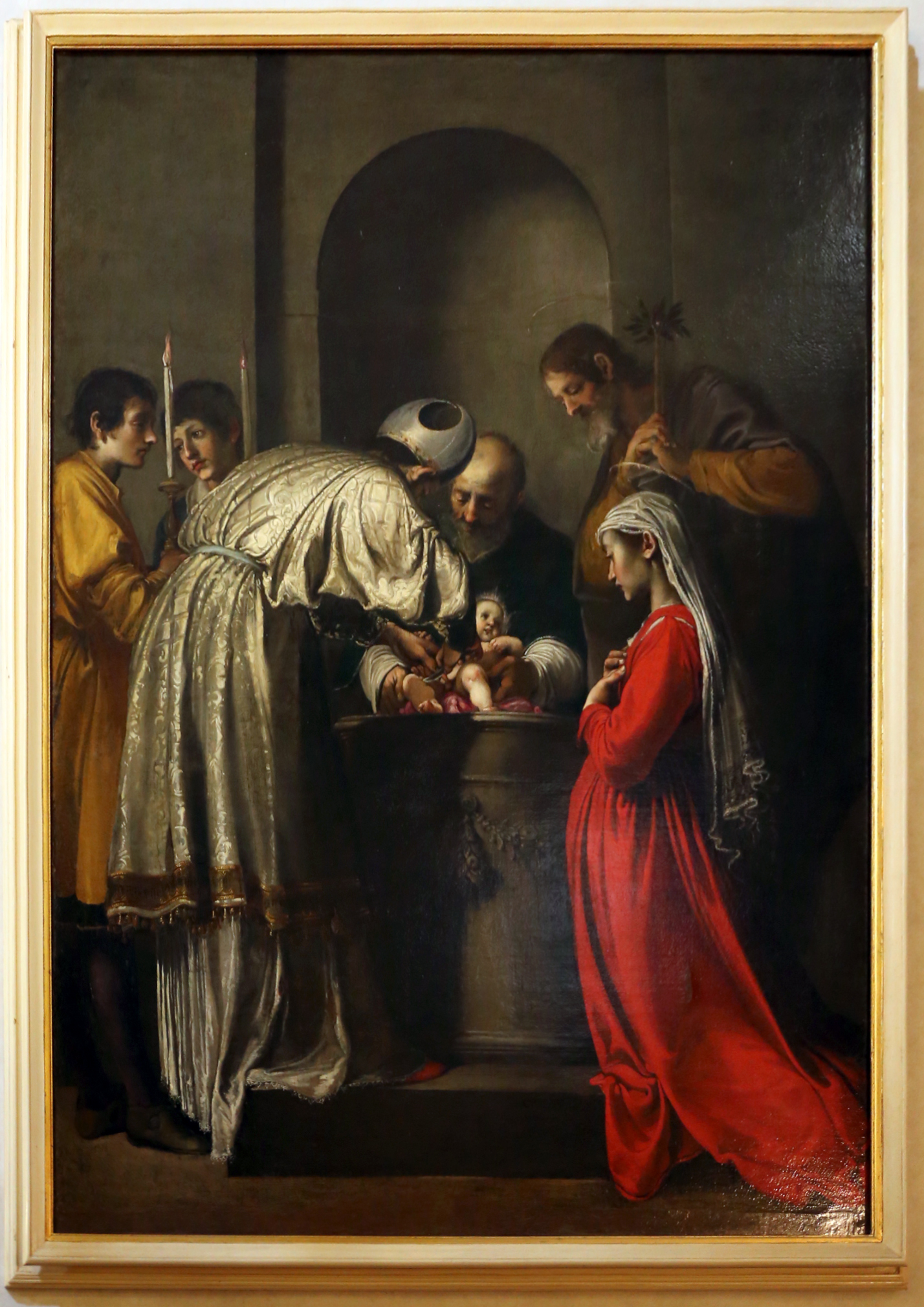
Circumcision of Jesus (c. 1620)
