= Giacinto Gimignani =

Italian painter (1606–1681)

- Born: 1606; Pistoia
- Died: 1681 (aged 74–75)
- Known for: Painting
- Movement: Baroque

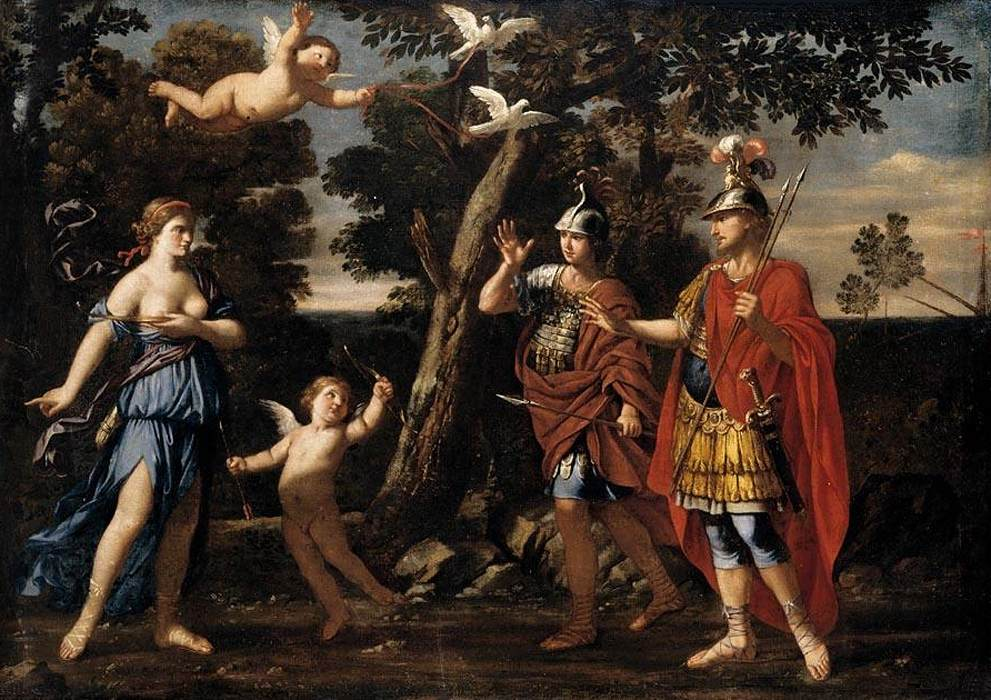
Venus appears to Aeneas and Achates

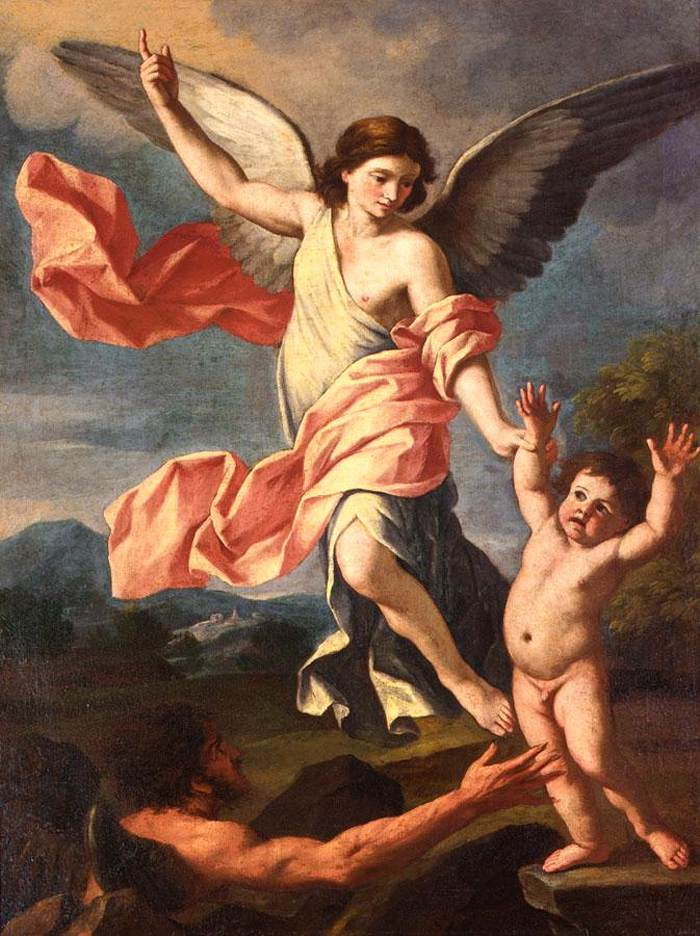
Angel and Devil fight for soul of child

Giacinto Gimignani (1606 – 9 December 1681) was an Italian painter, active mainly in Rome, during the Baroque period. He was also an engraver of aquaforte.

== Biography ==
Gimignani was born in Pistoia, where his father, Alessio (1567–1651) was also a painter and former pupil of Jacopo Ligozzi. Gimignani had been patronized by the prominent Giulio Rospigliosi, Cardinal Secretary of State, and descendant of the prominent Rospigliosi family of Pistoia.

By 1630 his father had arranged for him to travel to Rome, where he is said to have begun training under Poussin, and by 1632 he had transferred to work under Pietro da Cortona. Luigi Lanzi describes that he learned design from the former and color from the latter.

In Rome, his first known work is the fresco of the Rest on the Flight to Egypt (1632), a lunette in the chapel of the Palazzo Barberini. He competed with Camassei and Maratta for fresco commissions, including the fresco of the Vision of the Cross by Constantine the Great in the ambulatory of the baptistery of San Giovanni in Laterano. He completed this work under the guidance of Andrea Sacchi. In 1648, he assisted Cortona in the decoration of the Palazzo Pamphili in Rome. He developed a classical style befitting the grand manner style developing in Rome. Among other works in Rome, he painted a San Pio for the church of San Silvestro al Quirinale, and a Martyrdom canvas for the church of Santa Maria a Campo Santo. In Perugia, for the Benedictine church, he painted a St. Benedict meeting Totila, King of the Goths.

He joined the Accademia di San Luca in 1650. He married the daughter of the painter Alessandro Turchi of Verona. He spent his last years back in Tuscany. In Pistoia, are a number of paintings in the Museo Clemente Rospigliosi, including the Meeting of Venus and Adonis and The brothers show Joseph's bloody coat to Jacob.

The Fondazione Cassa di Risparmio di Pistoia e Pescia was the owner of Venus Awakened by Cupid, Olindo e Sophronia, Venus, Cupid and Time, Venere e amore, Olindo e Sofronia and La verità che scopre il tempo.

His son Ludovico Gimignani is also known for his fresco work in Rome.
