= Zagarolo =

- Comune
- Comune di Zagarolo
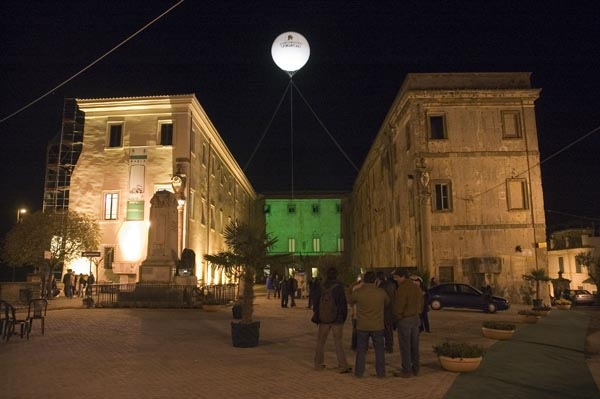
- Palazzo Rospigliosi

- Coat of arms

- Location within Italy Location within Lazio
- Coordinates: 41°50′N 12°50′E
- Country: Italy
- Region: Lazio
- Metropolitan city: Rome (RM)
- Frazioni: Valle Martella

Government
  - Mayor: Emanuela Panzironi

Area
  - Total: 28.04 km^{2} (10.83 sq mi)
- Elevation: 303 m (994 ft)

Population (31 August 2020)
  - Total: 18,475
  - Density: 658.9/km^{2} (1,706/sq mi)
- Demonym: Zagarolesi
- Time zone: UTC+1 (CET)
  - Summer (DST): UTC+2 (CEST)
- Postal code: 00039
- Website: www.zagarolo.rm.gov.it

Zagarolo is a town and comune in the Metropolitan City of Rome, in the region of Lazio of central Italy. It lies 34 kilometres (21 mi) southeast of Rome, and it borders the municipalities of Colonna, Gallicano nel Lazio, Monte Compatri, Palestrina, Rome, San Cesareo (former frazione of Zagarolo).

Zagarolo's town centre lies on a very narrow tuff hill, 2 kilometres (1.2 mi) long and about 100 metres (330 ft) wide, at an elevation of 310 metres (1,020 ft), surrounded by green valleys. The southern continuation of an important pilgrim route, the Via Francigena passes through the Zagarolo countryside.

== History ==
Zagarolo may have origins in Gabii, an ancient city founded in the 5th century, and sited a few kilometres from Zagarolo. It was an ancient Roman town and there are remains of a Roman amphitheatre.

Zagarolo's town centre is of medieval origin and its current urban plan was developed in the 16th century. The town is the birthplace of composer Goffredo Petrassi.

== Main sights ==
Most of the main attractions of Zagarolo are in the historical town centre, concentrated around the narrow 1.5-kilometre (0.9 mi) long main street (Via Antonio Fabrini and then Corso Vittorio Emanuele).

=== The Palace ===
The Palazzo Rospigliosi, in the city centre, occupies the site of an ancient medieval castle, which is first referenced to when Pope Paschal II destroyed Zagarolo in the early 12th century after the rebellion of the Colonna family, of which the palace was one of the strongholds. For many centuries it remained under the Colonna influence, and was besieged and destroyed several times due to the rivalry between the papacy and the Colonna family. In the 16th century, the Colonnas and the papacy started having peaceful relations, and Zagarolo became a duchy, hence the Palace became known as Palazzo Ducale.

The palace came to be used as a residence and two additional major wings were built towards the piazza, frescoes were added and a hanging garden was built. It was in this Palace that in 1591 a commission of eight cardinals met to revise the Bible for a printed edition, among them cardinal Marcantonio Colonna and Saint Robert Bellarmine. The building is characterized by frescoes painted by mannerist artists of the 16th century, attributed to Dutch painters, to Antonio Tempesta, and to the Zuccaris (Taddeo Zuccari and Federico Zuccari). Here in 1606 Caravaggio created masterpieces for the Colonna family, in exchange for refuge on his journey to Naples, between Zagarolo and Paliano he executed the Supper at Emmaus, Mary Magdalen in Ecstasy and perhaps Saint Francis in Prayer. The Palace also saw the of Carlo Maratta and of Ludovico Gimignani, the latter dying there in 1697.

In 1668, when the Rospigliosi acquired the duchy of Zagarolo, the Palace became their property, and was later in possession of the Pallavicini family, until it was sold to the comune in 1979. During World War II the palace was transformed into a German military hospital. Today the local library and Toy Museum are housed in the Palace, and it is used for conventions, exhibitions and other cultural events.

=== Churches ===
The Church of St Lawrence Martyr (1607) (Chiesa di San Lorenzo Martire), located in Piazza del Risorgimento, is the church dedicated to the patron saint of Zagarolo, St Lawrence of Rome.

The Convent and Church of St Mary of the Graces (Santa Maria delle Grazie), is located in Piazza Santa Maria. The Church of St Annunziata (1580–1582) (Chiesa di Santissima Annunziata), has a peculiar octagonal belltower, and dominates the skyline of Zagarolo.

The Church of St Peter (1717–1722) (Duomo di San Pietro Apostolo), a Baroque church built on the site of a more ancient church. It has an elliptical dome 46 metres high.

=== Other Features ===
The first gate to be encountered entering the city centre from the southeast is Porta Rospigliosi, decorated with bas-reliefs in the 16th century and Roman busts and theatrical masques. The other gate, at the northwest entrance to the city is Porta San Martino, named in honour of Pope Martin V (Oddone Colonna).

The Zagarolo Toy Museum is located in Rospigliosi Palace. The Museum offers a social reconstruction of toys and the act of playing in a series of sections that, through a historic excursus, crosses the fundamental periods of the 20th century. The communal council decided to create the museum in 1998. It was inaugurated in 2005 with a positive response from critics and the public. It holds over 800 examples of Italian and European toys of the 20th century.

Outside the town centre is the Tondo (as it is called by the local population), located at the hill called the Colle del Pero. It is a rare example of an ancient Roman Ludus dated to the 1st century AD, a sort of little amphitheatre used as a gym or training ground for gladiators (see List of Roman amphitheatres).

== Geography ==
The town centre of Zagarolo lies on a very narrow tufaceous plateau (2 kilometres long and about 100 meters wide) at an elevation of 310 metres, surrounded by two green valleys, the "Valle del Formale" and the "Valle della Foresta". Most of Zagarolo's inhabitants live, however, in the rolling green hills around town.

=== Climate ===
Zagarolo has a Mediterranean climate with warm and dry summers and cool and wet winters. Summer is mostly hot and sunny, with temperatures that may reach peaks above 37C (100F) for a few days. Summer is dry with occasional thunderstorms. Winter is cold with temperatures going often below 0C (32F). Zagarolo typically gets one small snowstorm in the winter. A historic half-metre snowstorm hit Zagarolo in 1982, isolating the town for a few days.

Climate data for Zagarolo
Month	Jan	Feb	Mar	Apr	May	Jun	Jul	Aug	Sep	Oct	Nov	Dec	Year
Mean daily maximum °C (°F)	12.3 (54.1)	13.8 (56.8)	16.0 (60.8)	19.1 (66.4)	23.6 (74.5)	27.8 (82.0)	31.6 (88.9)	31.3 (88.3)	27.6 (81.7)	22.5 (72.5)	16.9 (62.4)	13.3 (55.9)	21.3 (70.4)
Mean daily minimum °C (°F)	1.9 (35.4)	2.9 (37.2)	4.5 (40.1)	7.0 (44.6)	10.4 (50.7)	14.0 (57.2)	16.4 (61.5)	16.6 (61.9)	14.1 (57.4)	10.2 (50.4)	6.2 (43.2)	3.2 (37.8)	8.9 (48.1)
Average precipitation mm (inches)	74 (2.9)	74 (2.9)	61 (2.4)	66 (2.6)	56 (2.2)	43 (1.7)	28 (1.1)	46 (1.8)	71 (2.8)	89 (3.5)	100 (4.1)	86 (3.4)	800 (31.4)

== Transport ==
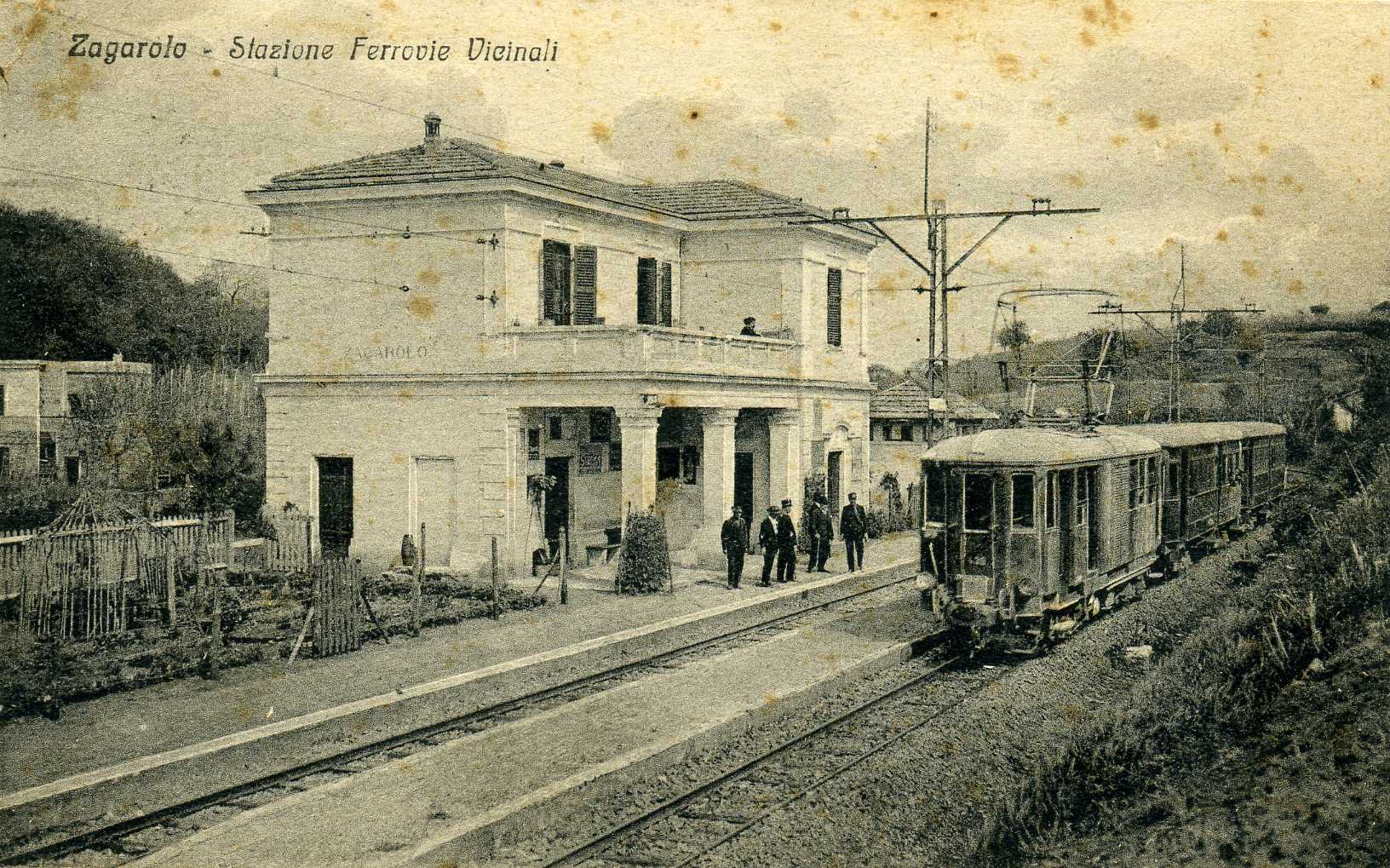
1927 postcard of the Zagarolo train station "Stazione Vicinale"

The northern and southern limits of Zagarolo are marked by two important ancient Roman roads that are today still in use, the Via Praenestina to the north and the Via Casilina to the south. Easier access is provided by the A1 motorway and the A24 motorway.

Zagarolo has a main train station, 2 kilometres from the city centre, that connects the town to Rome, Ciampino, Frosinone, Caserta and Cassino. Trains for Rome have a frequency between 20 and 60 minutes. The journey to Rome takes about 30 minutes. There is access from Zagarolo to Ciampino International Airport via railway and then a shuttle bus from Ciampino train station.

== Organizations ==
- "Amici di Zagarolo" is a non-profit organization dedicated to the promotion of the cultural and folkloristic heritage of the town of Zagarolo, operating since the 1990s.
- The Touro College has opened a new branch in Zagarolo at the Rospigliosi Palace. The Touro University, Rome, in collaboration with the comune of Zagarolo, organizes independent, not-for-credit English courses for the population of Zagarolo and the surrounding area.

== International relations ==
Zagarolo is twinned with:

- Nelahozeves, Czech Republic
- Six-Fours-les-Plages, France
