= Palazzo Rospigliosi a Ripa del Sale =

Palace in Pistoia, Italy

Coordinates: 43.934752°N 10.918685°E

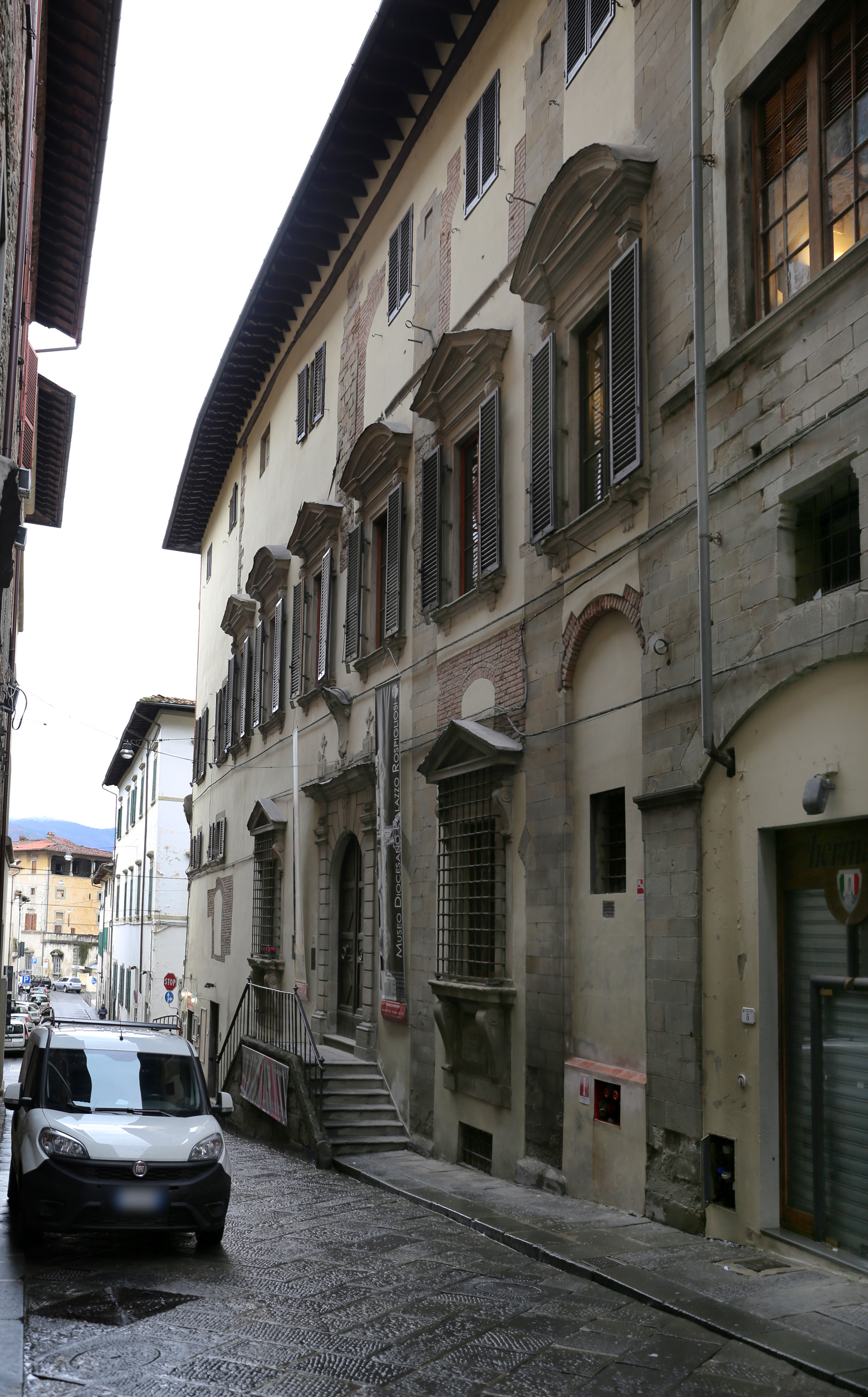
Palazzo Rospigliosi a Ripa del Sale

The Palazzo Rospigliosi a Ripa del Sale or Rospigliosi sulla Ripa is a former aristocratic palace located at Via Ripa del Sale number 3 in central Pistoia, Tuscany, Italy. The location is in a small alley adjacent to the Pistoia Cathedral, within the most ancient set (first set) of city walls. In the 19th century, the palace was donated to the diocese and now is used as both Diocesan museum and for the display of the collection donated by Clemente Rospigliosi.

== Description ==
The original owners of the structures at this site was the Dondoli family, but later sold to the Rospigliosi-Sozzifanti family in the 16th century. They rebuilt the house and adjacent structures into the present structure. They were related to the Rospigliosi family owning the Palazzo Rospigliosi a Via del Duca, where Giulio Rospiglio, later Pope Clement IX was born in 1600. The pope supposedly may have stayed in this palace during his visit to Pistoia.

Clemente Rospigliosi, who died in 1981, endowed the palace to the diocese with instructions to preserve it and some of the contents in part as a museum dedicated to his papal ancestor. The Rospigliosi collection held furniture, decorations, and artworks including fresco decorations that bedecked the palace during the Pope's visit to his native town. Among the works are an altarpiece by Fra Paolino and a Bath of Bathsheba by Sebastiano Vini. Other painters in collection are Jacopo Vignali, Lorenzo Lippi, Felice Ficarelli, and a Death of Germanicus attributed to a follower of Nicolas Poussin. Among the works by Giacinto Gimignani displayed are:

- Joseph and the Wife of Potiphar
- Labors of Hercules
- Adam, Eve with Cain and Abel
- Brothers expose the Coat of Joseph
- Joseph explains the dreams to the Pharaoh

The Diocesan Museum was moved from the Bishop's palace on via Puccini here in 1968. It contains precious artifacts from various churches in the jurisdiction. In addition it has a Holy Conversation by Bernardino del Signoraccio; processional standards by Sollazzino (c. 1460–1543) and Scalabrino (1489-1561).

== Gallery ==
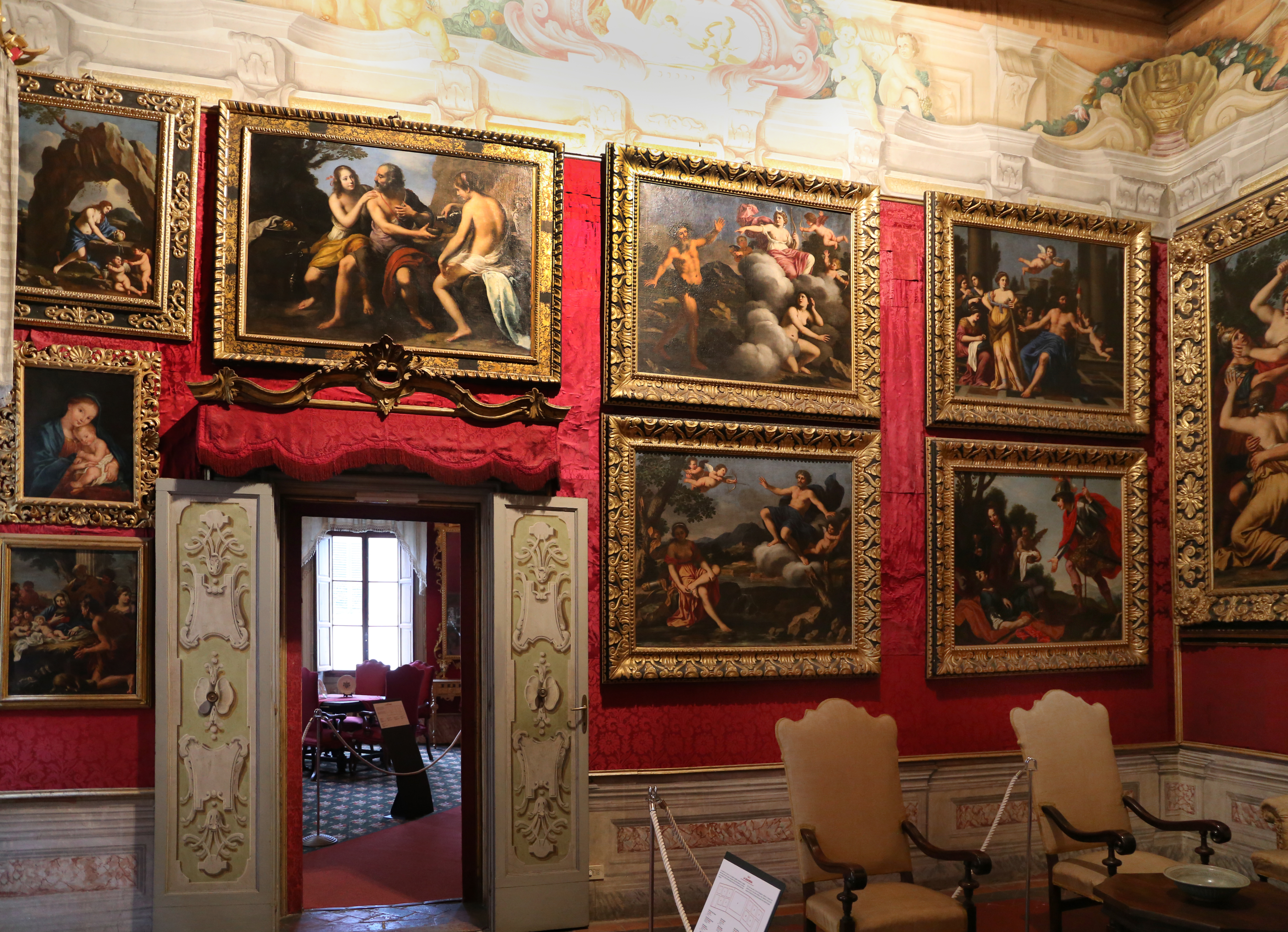
Museo Clemente Rospigliosi, painting collection

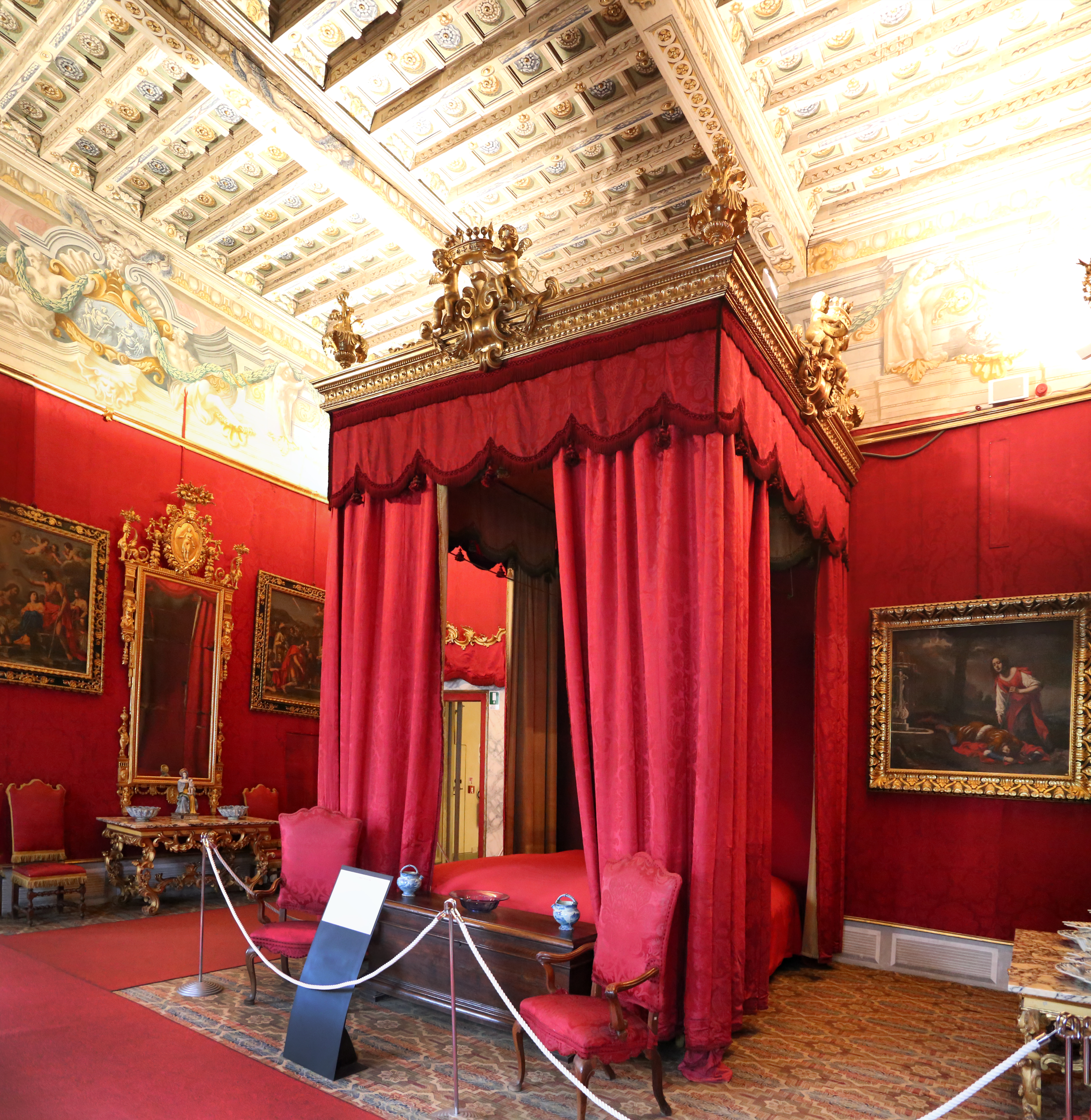
Camera del Baldacchino

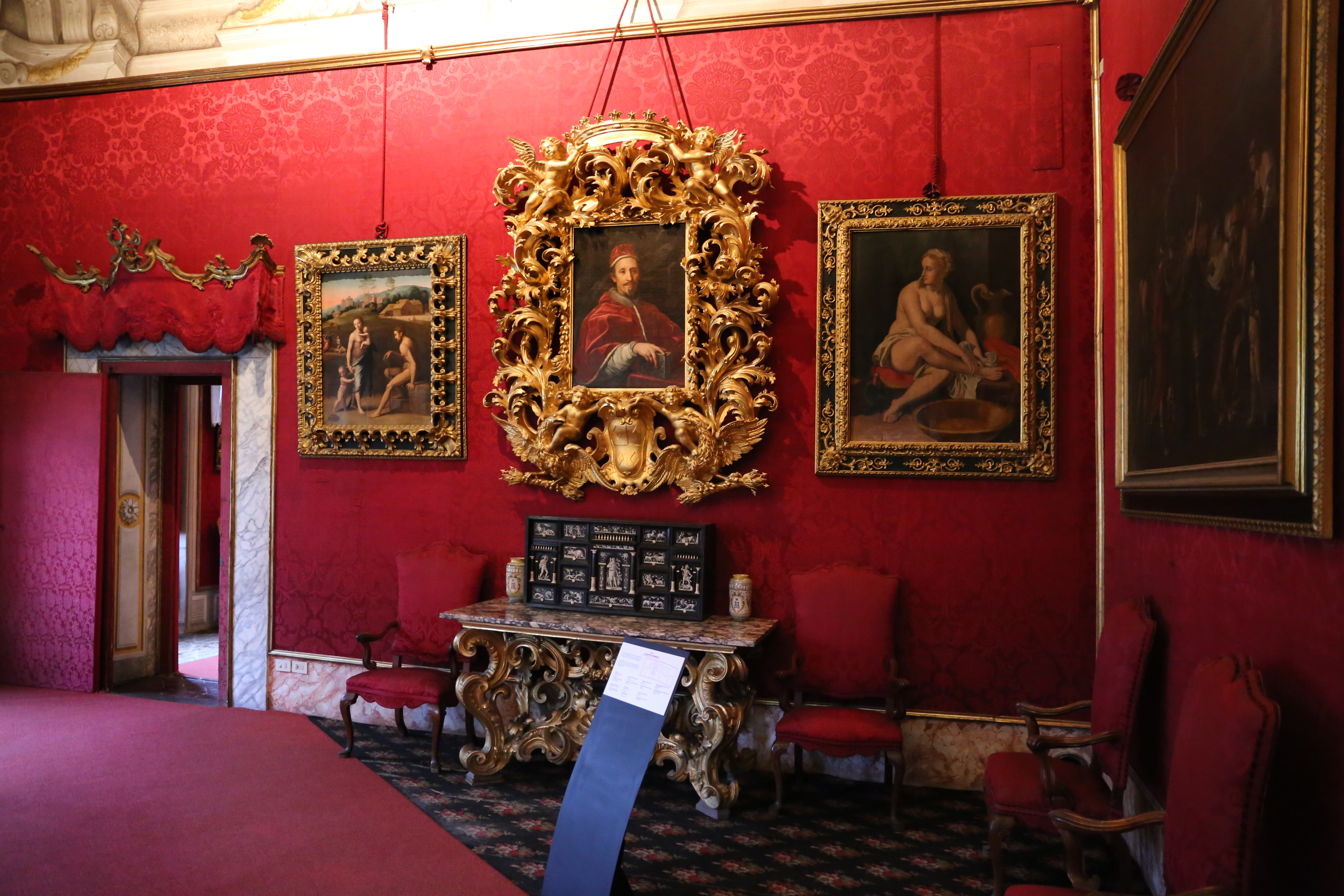
Salotto d'Angolo with portrait of Pope Clement IX in gilded frame

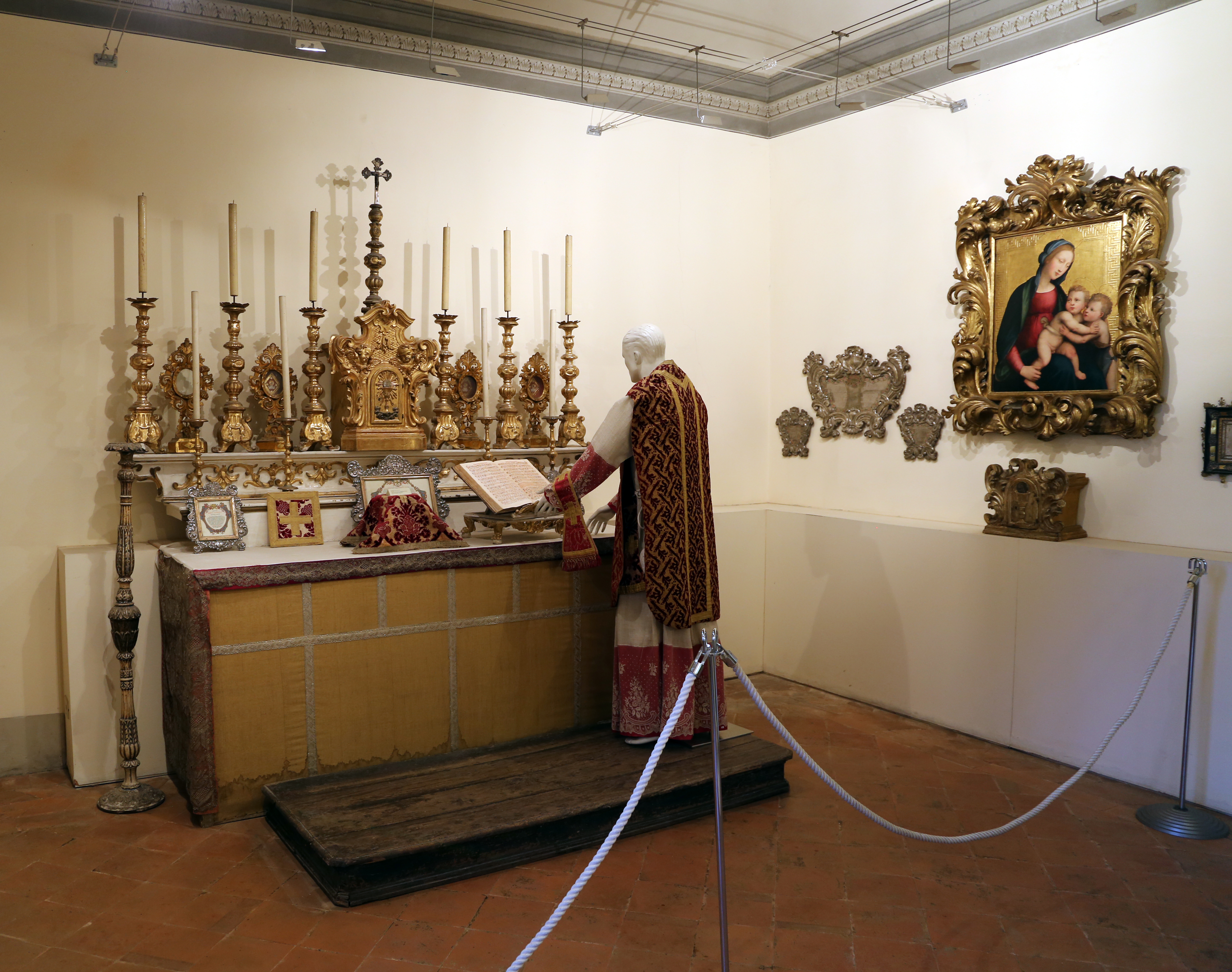
Exhibit in Diocesan Museum
