= Reinhold Vasters =

- Born: 2 January 1827
- Died: 14 June 1909 (aged 82); Aachen, Prussia, German Empire
- Occupation: Goldsmith

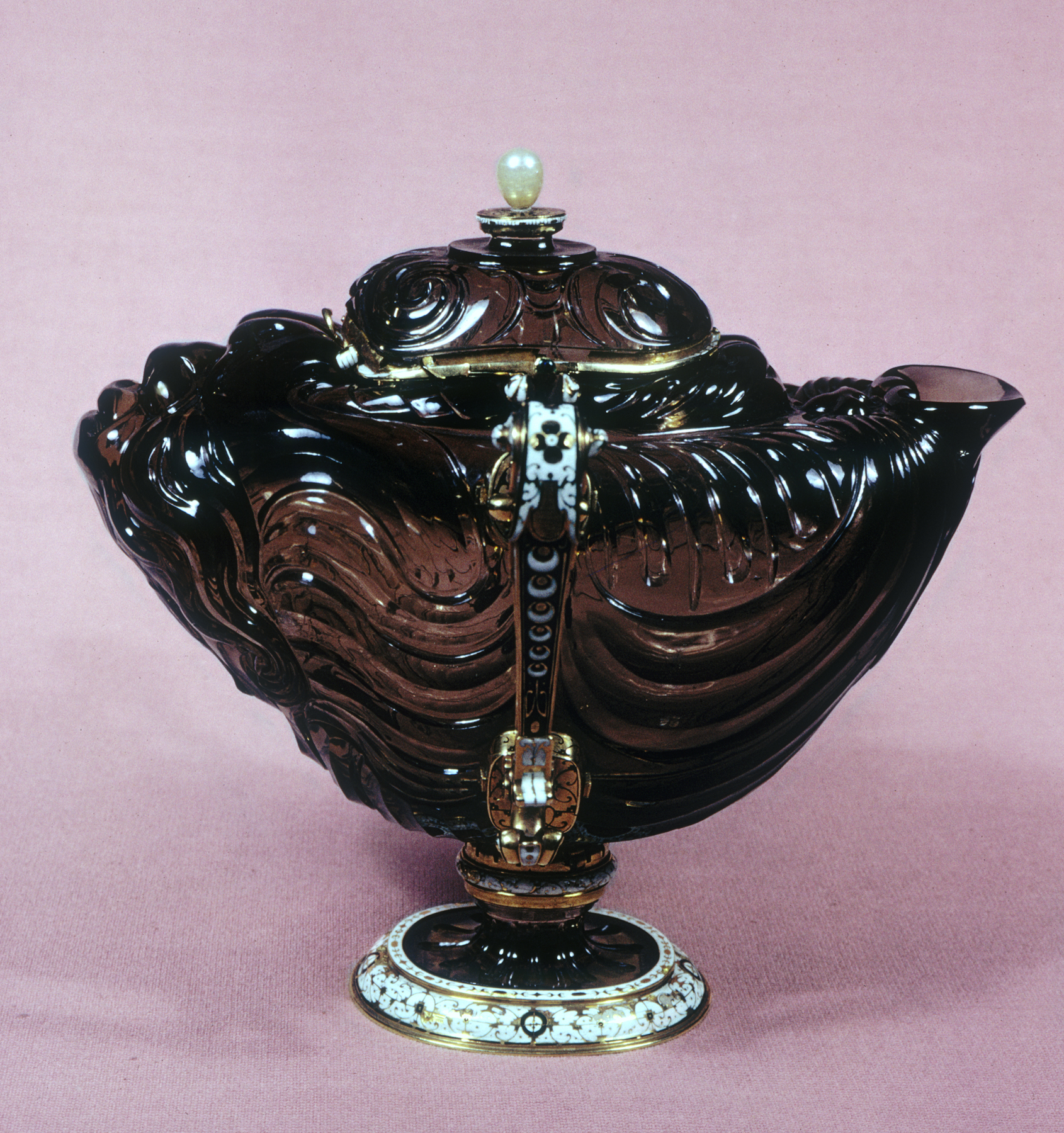
Vessel in the Form of a Seamonster, by Reinhold Vasters

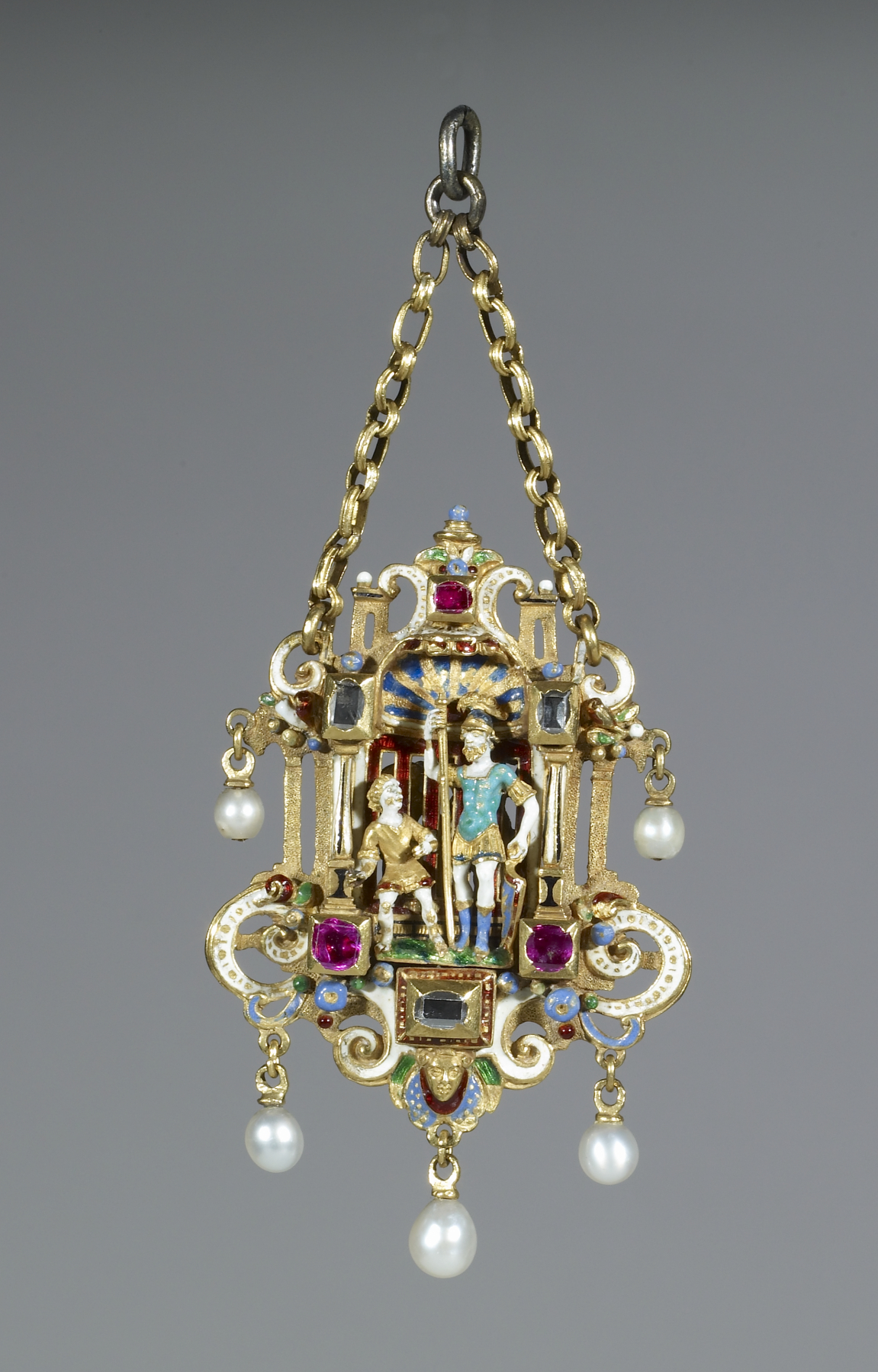
Renaissance-Style Pendant with David, about to swing his sling at Goliath, who appears in the dress of a Roman military leader, by Reinhold Vasters

Reinhold Vasters (2 January 1827 – 14 June 1909) was a German goldsmith. When a collection of his designs came to light some 60 years after his death, it became apparent that he had been a prolific art forger.

== Early and private life ==
Vasters was born in Erkelenz, a few miles north of Aachen. His father was a locksmith. His father died when he was aged 8, and he was raised by his uncle. After attending school, he trained as a goldsmith in Krefeld, and developed his skills further in London, Paris and Vienna. He exhibited works at the Great Exhibition in London in 1851, and won a prize. He moved to Aachen, registering his mark in 1853. In Aachen, he worked with Heinrich Joseph Viethen making and repairing metal articles for the cathedral, and developed a reputation as a specialist in antique liturgical gold and silver.

He married Anna Catharina Josepha Hammacher in 1855; she was the sister of painter Theodor Hammacher. They had three children, but she died shortly after giving birth to the third in 1859.

Vasters suffered a stroke and died in Aachen, aged 82 years. He was survived by two children and eight grandchildren.

== Art forgeries ==
To support his family after his wife's death, Vasters started to create reproduction works in a historical style. He worked for the art historian Franz Bock, who moved to Aachen in 1862, and for goldsmiths August Witte and Martin Vogeno.

He also worked for the art dealer Frédéric Spitzer from Vienna, who helped Vasters to sell historical fakes. He became an expert in creating convincing fakes, which he distressed and aged, and also added fake later additions and fake workmen's marks. He became an expert in faking Renaissance jewellery, in the styles of, for example, Wenzel Jamnitzer, Leone Leoni, or Valerio Belli.

When an archive of his designs came to light in the Victoria & Albert Museum in London in the 1970s, it became apparent that many works held by that museum and the Metropolitan Museum of Art in New York, originally considered to be originals, were faked by Vasters. The designs were acquired in Aachen in 1909 by the art dealer Murray Marks, sold to Lazare Lowenstein in 1918, and donated to the V&A in 1919. One example is the Rospigliosi Cup, previously attributed to Benvenuto Cellini and then to Jacopo Bilivert or Biliverti. He is suspected to be involved in several objects in the Waddesdon Bequest in the British Museum. Others are still undiscovered in other museums and private collections.
