= Palazzo Rospigliosi a Via del Duca =

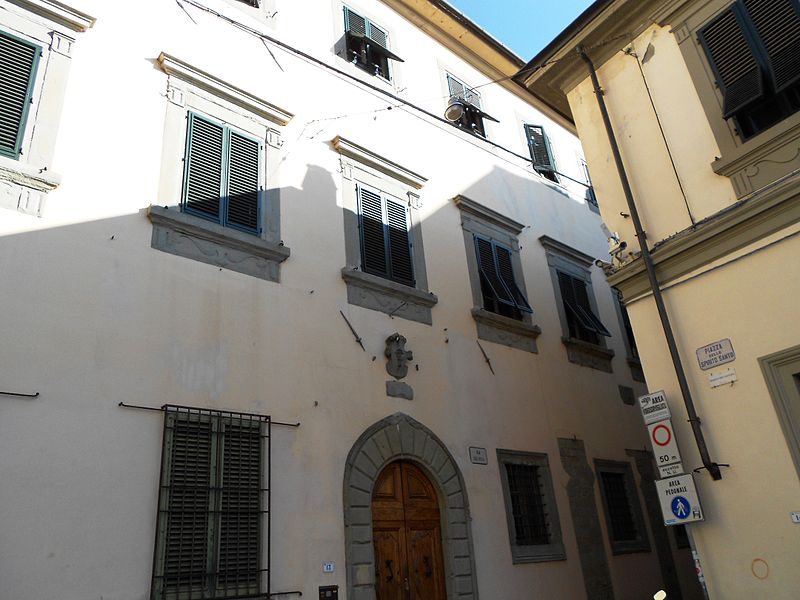
Part of the facade

The Palazzo Rospigliosi a Via del Duca is a former aristocratic palace located at Via Ripa del Sale number 3 in central Pistoia, Tuscany, Italy. The palace was the birthplace in 1600 of Giulio Rospiglio, later Pope Clement IX.

The original owners of the structures at this site was the Ammannati family, owners of a wealthy bank. But after the 1306 capture of Pistoia by Florentine troops, it was confiscated and given to the Marchese Moroello di Manfredi de' Malaspina (Moroello Malaspina), a patron and friend of Dante. By 1319, it was sold to Simone di M. Rosso della Tosa, and then the Lenzi family, who then sold it to the Rospigliosi in the 16th century.

The palace is privately owned but notable for a chapel in the Piano Nobile, frescoed circa 1633 by Giovanni da San Giovanni. The work was patronized by Camillo Rospigliosi, in memory of his mother, Caterina. The frescoes are said to include contemporary portraits of the family, in the depictions of the Life of St Catherine, including an altarpiece depicting her Mystical Marriage.

== Gallery of Giovanni da San Giovanni's frescoes in Chapel of Palace ==
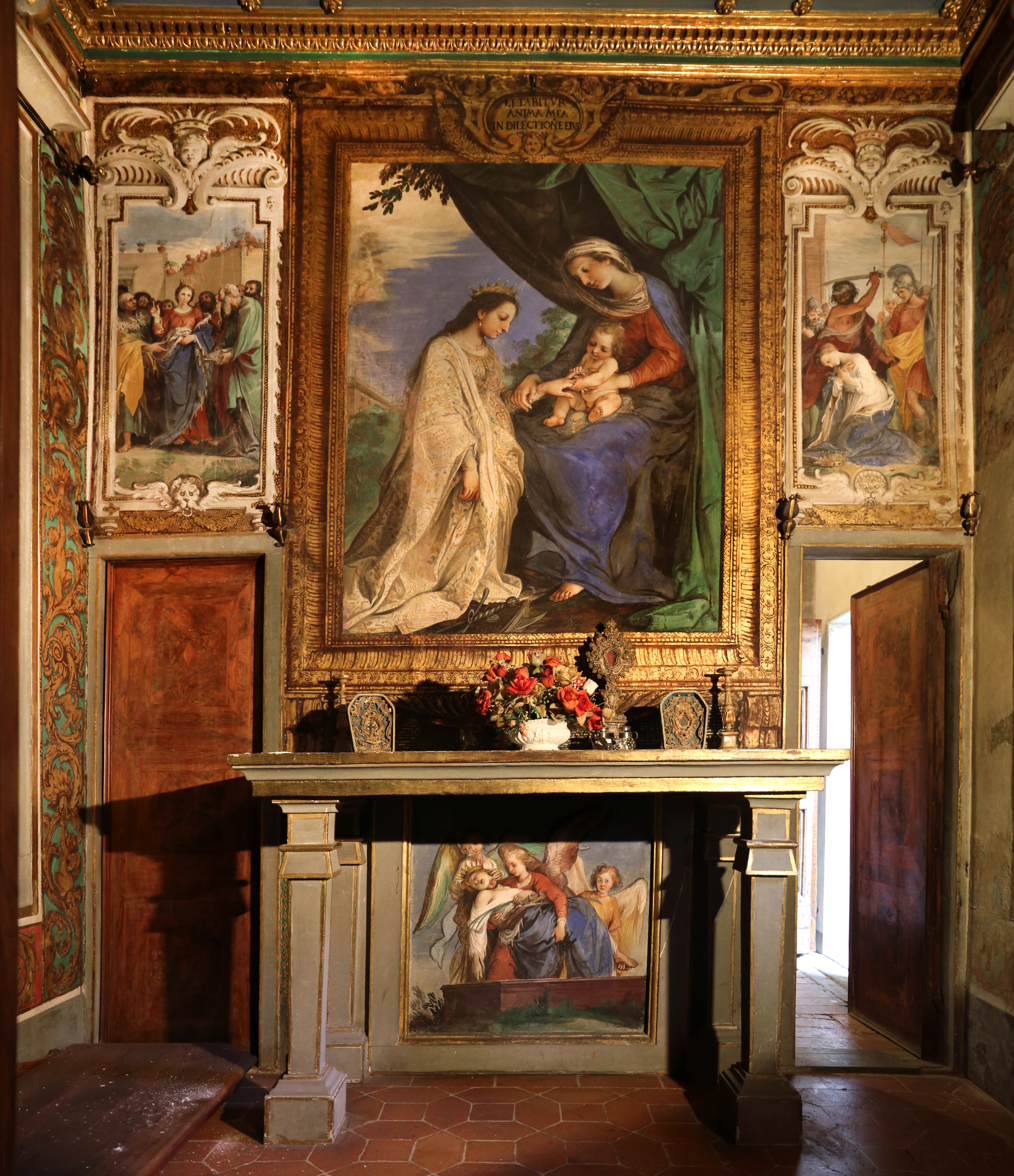

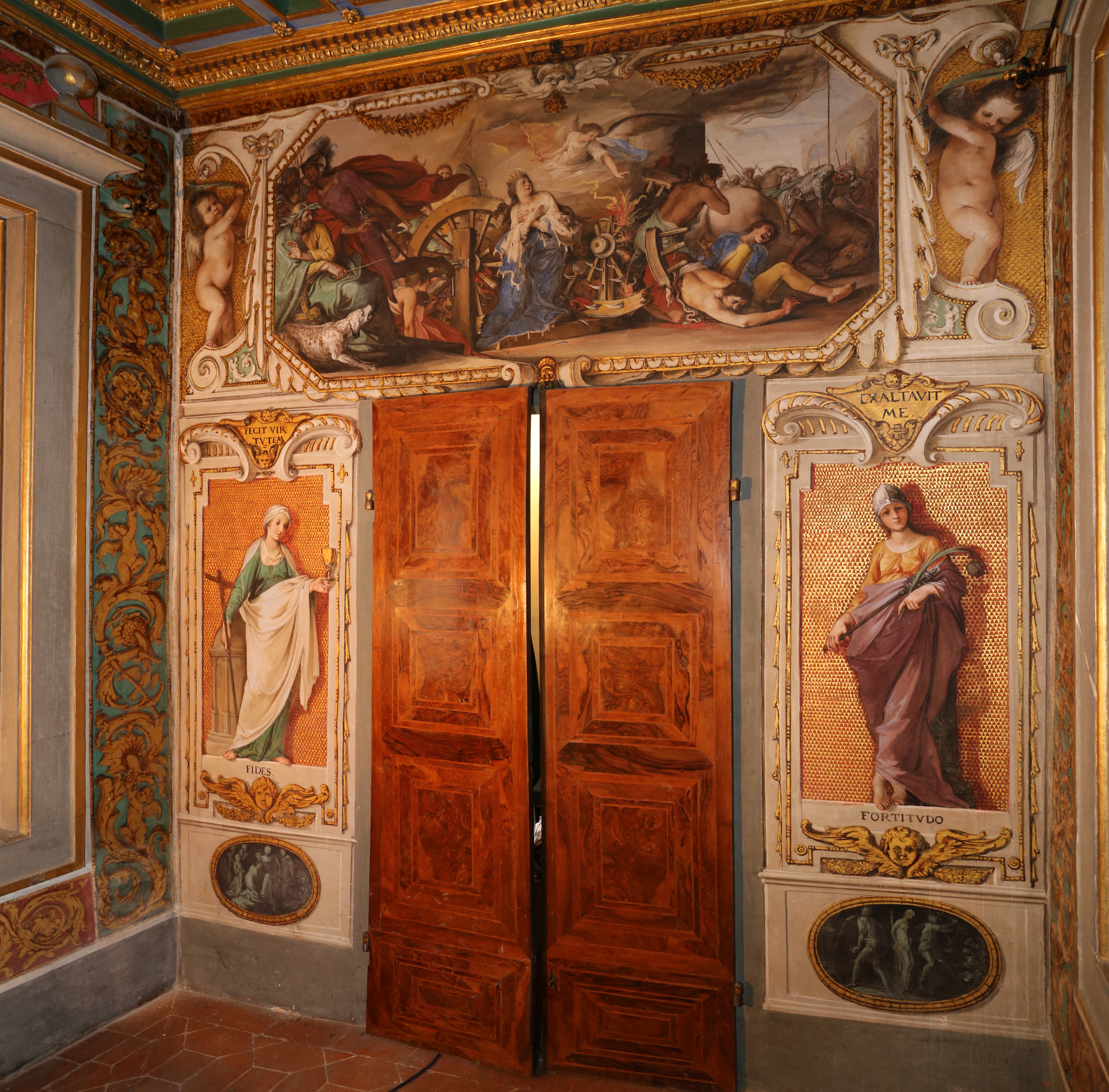

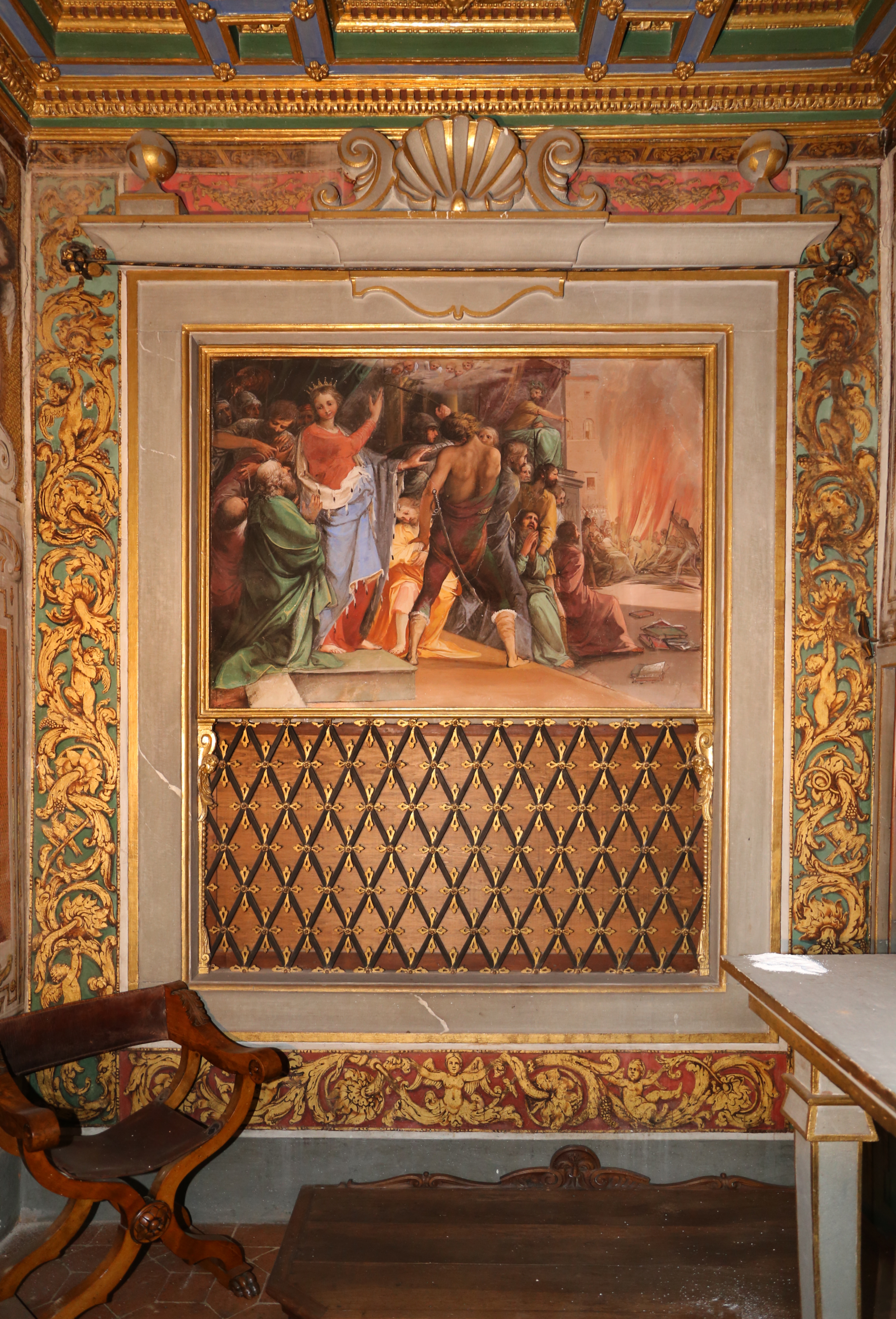

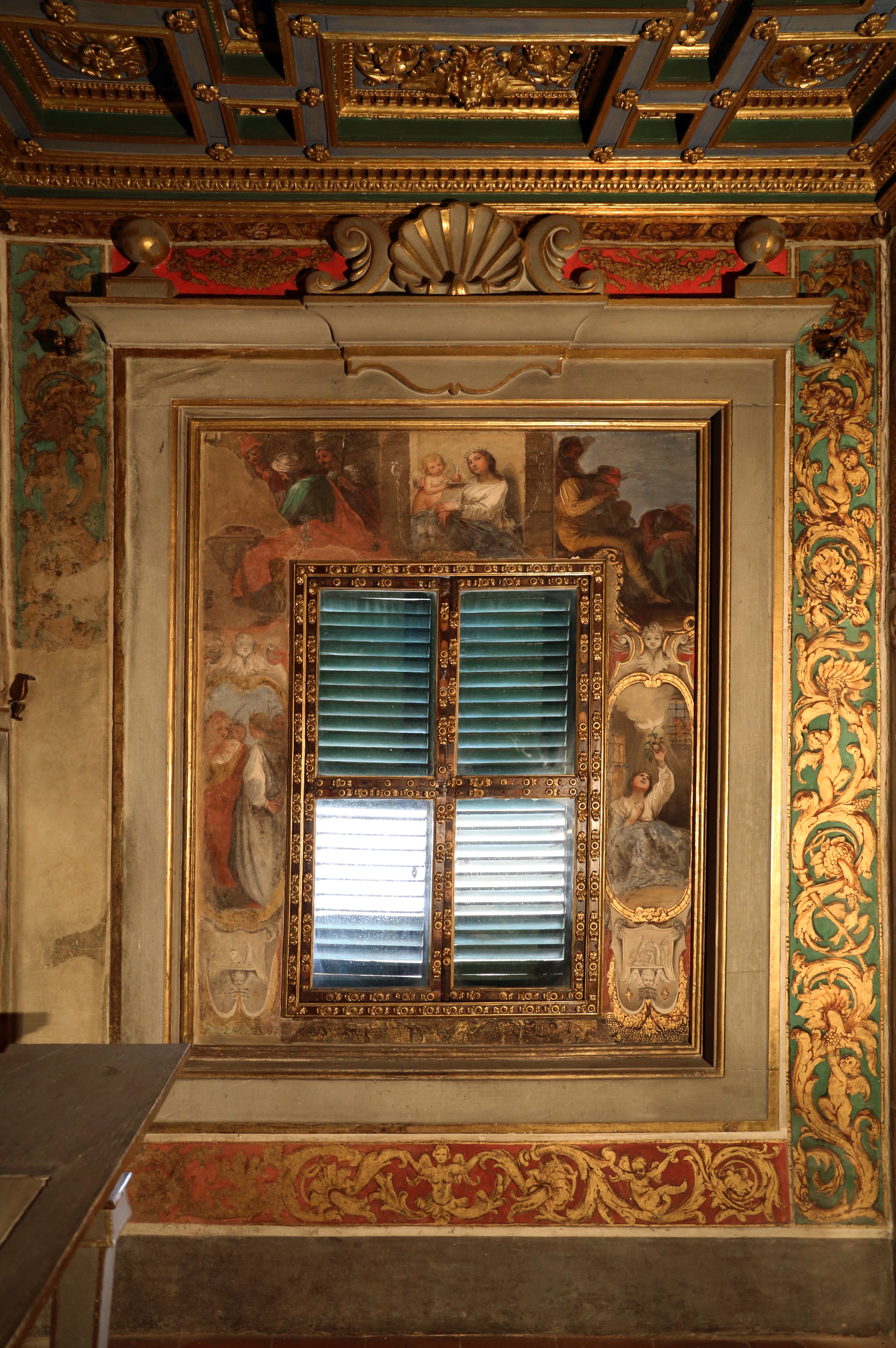
