= Rospigliosi family =

Italian noble family

Arms of the Rospigliosi family
- Motto: Omnia a Deo (Latin for 'Everything comes from God')

The House of Rospigliosi (Italian pronunciation: [rospiʎˈʎoːzi, -oːsi]) is an ancient noble Italian family from Pistoia. Attested since the Middle Ages, it became wealthy through agriculture, trade and industry, reaching the apogee of its power and the high nobility status in Rome thanks to Giulio Rospigliosi, elected pope in 1667 with the name of Clement IX.

== History ==
=== 12th – 16th century ===
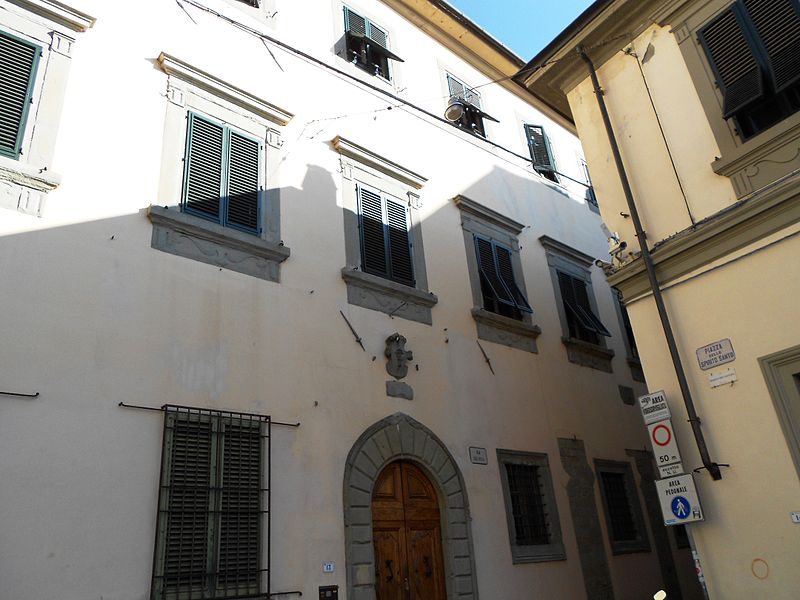
Palazzo Rospigliosi at Via del Duca, Pistoia, one of the two Rospigliosi mansions in the city, birthplace of pope Clement IX and his brother Camillo

The family originated from Milan: in the late 12th century Ridolfo Rospigliosi, possibly to escape Emperor Frederick Barbarossa, settled in Lamporecchio, a village between Pistoia and Empoli, on the slope of the Monte Albano, at the entrance of the Val di Nievole, where the family acquired farms and forests and built a country house. These large possessions were owned by the Rospigliosi until the twentieth century. The family, which had obtained the first nobility titles at the beginning of the 13th century, moved to Pistoia in 1315, and can prove its unbroken descent from a certain Giovanni who lived in 1306. After the Rospigliosi had moved to Pistoia they became active in trade and industry, such as wool, cloth, spices and contracting of local taxes. In 1330 a Taddeo, chief of the militia of Pistoia, was sent to the aid of Montecatini, against the Florentines, and ninety years later, Giovanni was condottiero of a Florentine and Pistoiese soldiery at the service of pope Martin V in the struggle for the reconquest of the Papal States against Braccio da Montone. In name of the pope in 1420 he conquered Orvieto and Narni. Giovan Battista, nicknamed Bati, another valiant man of war, served against the Spaniards at the services of France, standing out especially in the war for Parma (1551–52) and the siege of Mirandola (1551); subsequently he passed to the orders of pope, and in 1566 he was appointed by him admiral of the Holy Roman Church. Other Rospigliosi were Knights of the Order of Saint Stephen or of the Sovereign Military Order of Malta. Several members of the family held the office of standard-bearer of the city of Pistoia: the first among them was Filippo Taddeo, who held this office in 1373, and the last Taddeo, who was standard-bearer for three times in the years 1566, 1571 and 1580. In the 16th century the family, still living in Pistoia, split into two lines, that of Pope Clement IX, known as "del Duca" which resided in Palazzo Rospigliosi at Via del Duca, bought by Girolamo Rospigliosi, and that founded by Giambattista Bati, which resided in the Palazzo Rospigliosi at Ripa del Sale. During the whole 15th and 16th centuries, the Rospigliosi continued trading and owned a flourishing bank in Pistoia, with branches and correspondents all over Europe. However, until the first half of the 17th century the family still gained most of its income from wool production and trade, and agriculture.

=== 17th century and later ===
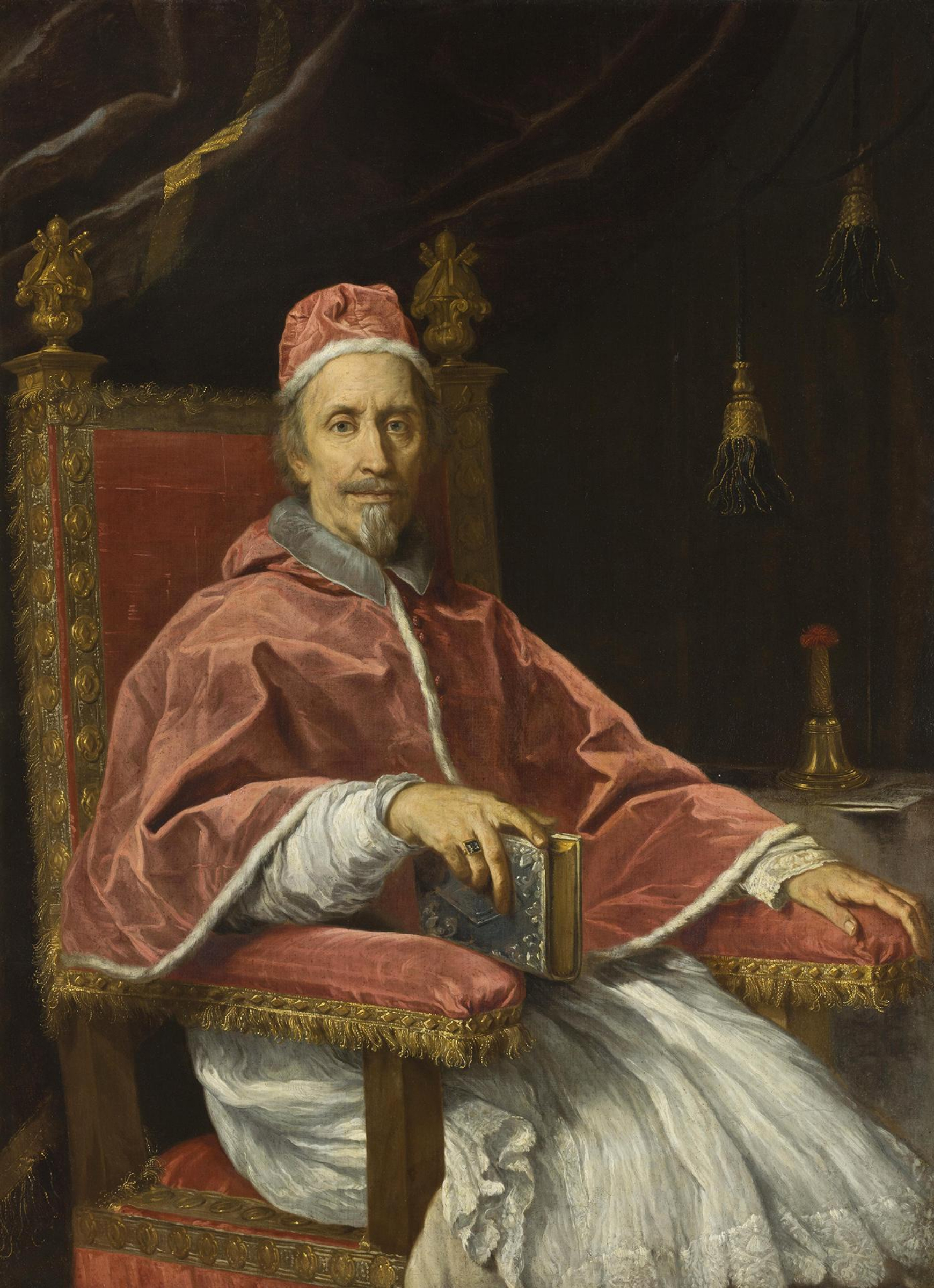
Pope Clement IX, born as Giulio Rospigliosi, portrayed by Carlo Maratta

This family of merchants rose gradually to great fame after that Giulio, son of Gerolamo, was elevated to the dignity of the sacred purple in 1657 and became pope in 1667 under the name of Clement IX. In summer 1667, right after the pope's election, the branch of the family which originated from Milanese di Taddeo and which resided in the Palazzo in Via del Duca, with the pope's brother Camillo and his sons, moved to Rome, a step that would soon open to them the gates of the Roman, Venetian, Genoese and Ferrarese high nobility. Two nephews of Clement IX were made Cardinals: Giacomo (d. 1684), was appointed Cardinal-nephew by his uncle in 1667, and became internuncio at Brussels, Legato at Avignon and Ferrara, and prefect of the Signatura di Grazia (a papal tribunal); Felice (d. 1688), was appointed Cardinal in 1673 by Pope Clement X. His brother Camillo was appointed general of the pope's army, while another of Camillo's sons, Tommaso, became castellan of Castel Sant'Angelo, and Vincenzo, another nephew of the pope, was appointed commander of the papal galleys. In 1668 he was sent by his uncle in aid of the Venetians in a desperate attempt to rescue the Venetian fortress of Candia during the war against the Ottoman Turks. One year later he was appointed commander in chief of all the allied forces (Venetian, French and papal) collected against the Turks, but at the end the fortress was lost to the Ottomans together with the whole island of Crete.Another nephew Teodoro Giulio Rospigliosi, Royal Ensign was sent in 1647 to Peru by Phillip IV, King of Spain, with offspring.

The move that made of the Rospigliosi one of the first families of the Roman nobility, was the marriage of another pope's nephew, Giambattista (1646–1722), with Maria Camilla Pallavicini, the heir of a rich and noble Genoese family.

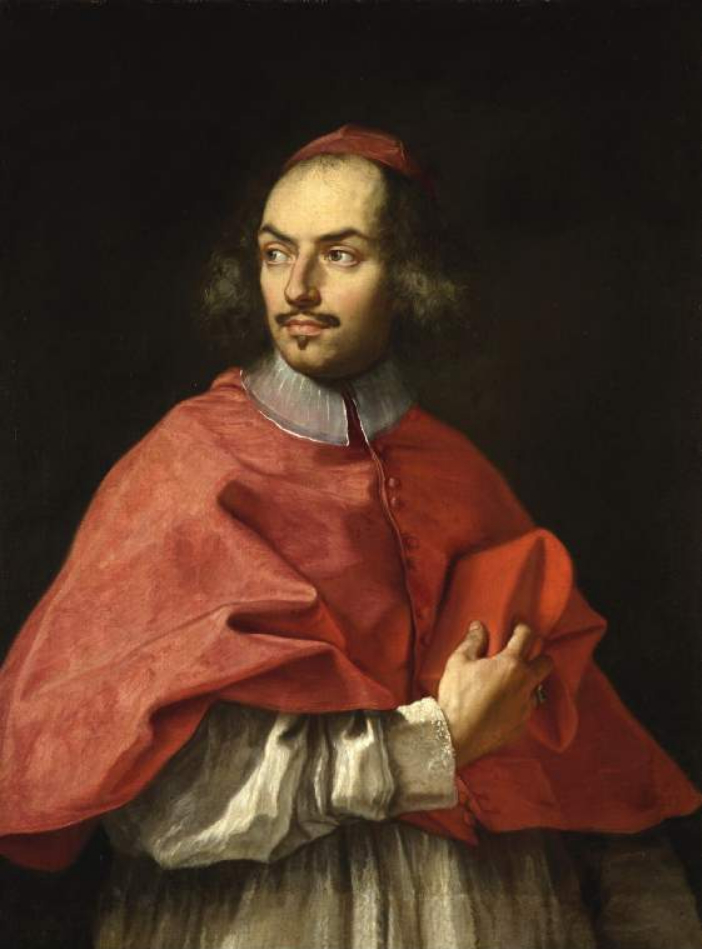
Giacomo Rospigliosi, cardinal-nephew of Pope Clement IX, in a painting of Carlo Maratta

Giambattista, nominated general of the Pope and created Prince of the Holy Roman Empire in 1658, bought in 1668 the Duchy of Zagarolo from the Ludovisi. Having married in 1670 Maria Camilla, the last of his branch and granddaughter of Cardinal Lazzaro Sforza Pallavicini, he inherited by the will of the latter the principality of Gallicano and the marquisate of Colonna, with the title of prince and the obligation to take the name and the emblem of the Pallavicini, who would then have to pass on to his descendants in second-line. A niece of Clement X was Donna Caterina Rospigliosi Banchieri, who gave rise to the branch Banchieri Rospigliosi, whose founder was Pietro Banchieri Rospigliosi, depicted in a famous series of paintings, entitled "Il bambino Rospigliosi", now on display at the Museum of Rome. Favouring his relatives, the pope continued the nepotistic politics of his Barberini, Pamphili and Chigi predecessors, although it should be noticed that the positions that he was assigning were not supposed to generate large revenues, so that this can be seen as a first trend inversion with respect to the recent past of the church government.

In the 19th century, the family expanded further its nobility status, when Giulio Cesare (1781–1859), fourth Prince Rospigliosi, married Margherita Colonna Gioeni, acquiring through that all her titles of nobility. From this marriage were born: Clemente, which gave rise to the branch of the princes Rospigliosi-Gioeni; and Francesco, who was the founder of the branch of the princes Pallavicini-Rospigliosi.

While the Rospigliosi from Ripa del Sale branch came to an end in 1981 with the death of Clemente, the current members of the Del Duca branch live in the Villa Aldobrandini Banchieri Rospigliosi and are still direct descendants from the line of Giulio Rospigliosi, (Pope Clement IX), through her ancestor Olga Banchieri. Actually also direct descendants are in Buenos Aires, Argentina which is the lineage branch of Brigadier Generale of the Royal Spaniard Army, Don Pascual Ibanez y Roca who died in 1805 in Buenos Aires, and married Maria Francesca de Rospigliosi e Ramirez de Saguez, founding members of the Ibanez de Rospigliosi family. They have had three children, Sebastian Pascual Pablo, founder of the Ibanez de Rospigliosi family in Mendoza City, Coronel Pedro Nolasco Tiburcio in Buenos Aires, Edecan of Gral. Belgrano, and Maria Ramona Francisca who married Gral. Tomas de Rocamora, founder of Gualeguaychu in Argentina.

In 1982, after the death of Clemente Rospigliosi, the last representative of the Ripa del Sale branch, the Forteguerriana Library of Pistoia received as a legacy the family library, where there is a large music section. Among others, Giulio Rospigliosi was passionate about music and before being elected pope wrote several opera libretti.

== Residences ==
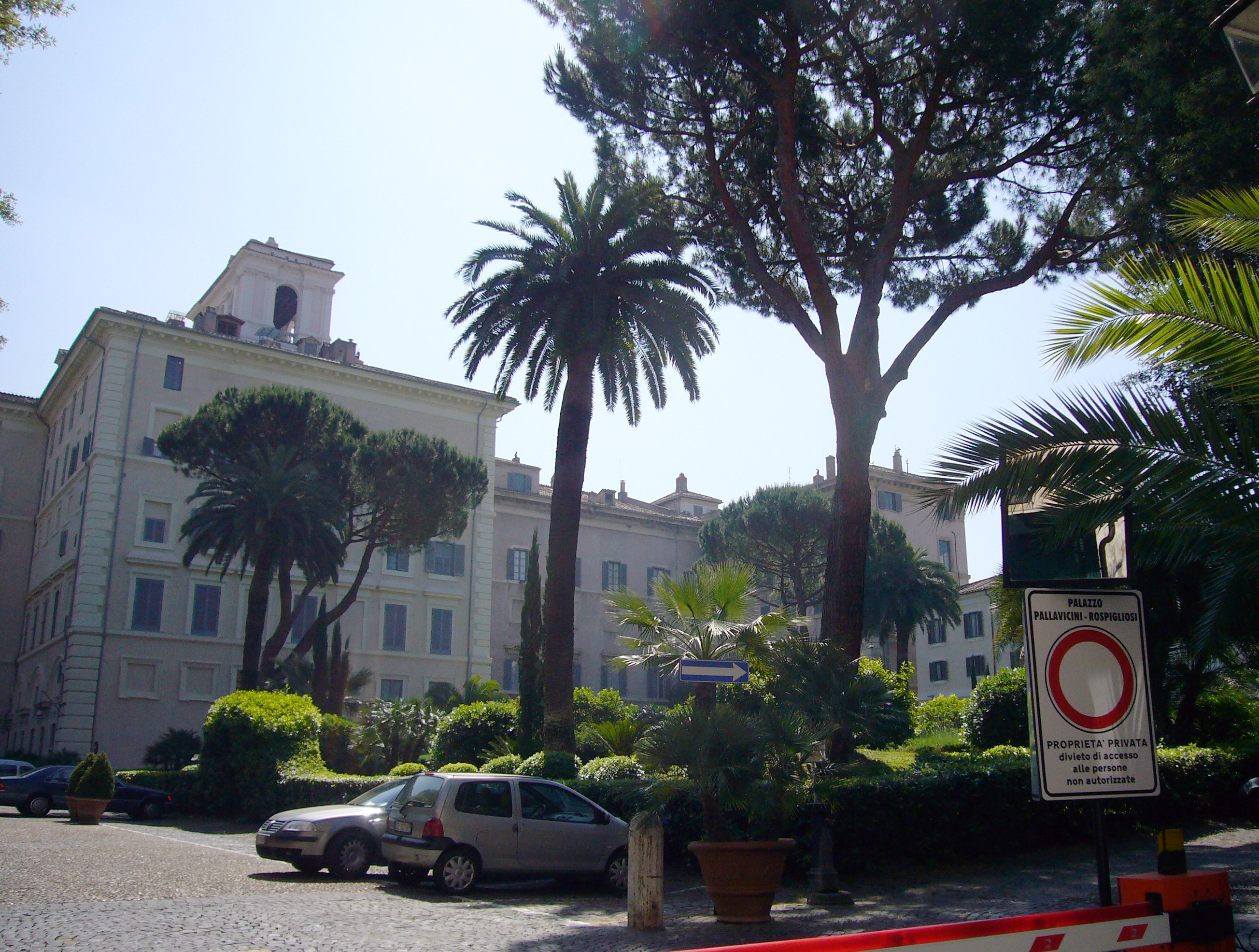
Palazzo Rospigliosi-Pallavicini in Rome, Quirinal

The Rospigliosi owned many buildings, in Pistoia, Rome and their surroundings. In the Tuscan city the family resided in the two historical mansions named Palazzo Rospigliosi a Via del Duca and Palazzo Rospigliosi a Ripa del Sale. The former, originally the residence of the noble Ammannati family, and then bought by the Malaspina, was so named after that the family acquired in 1667 the title of duchy of Zagarolo. It was acquired at the middle of the 16th century by Girolamo Rospigliosi, and there were born his sons Camillo and Giulio, the future Clement IX. The palace at Ripa del Sale was erected between the middle of 16th and the beginning of 17th century by Gianbattista Bati Rospigliosi, and has been always the seat of this branch of the family until its extinction in 1981. In Rome, they owned the magnificent Palazzo Pallavicini-Rospigliosi on the Quirinal Hill, in the Rione Monti. This building, originally belonged to the Borghese, was purchased in 1704 by Prince Giovanni Battista Rospigliosi, Camillo's son and nephew of Pope Clement IX, and his wife, Princess Maria Camilla Pallavicini, and became home of the Rospigliosi Pallavicini family, who still owns the half of it, while the other half was sold to escape the financial ruin due to the attempt of reclaiming the swamps of Maccarese, near Rome. Also noteworthy are the Villa Rospigliosi at the hamlet Spicchio di Lamporecchio, commissioned by the Pope himself, and built according to a design of Bernini by Mattia de Rossi, the Palazzo Rospigliosi at Zagarolo, near Rome, the Palazzo Rospigliosi-Pallavicini in Florence, and the Palazzo Rospigliosi Banchieri in Pistoia.

== Titles of nobility ==
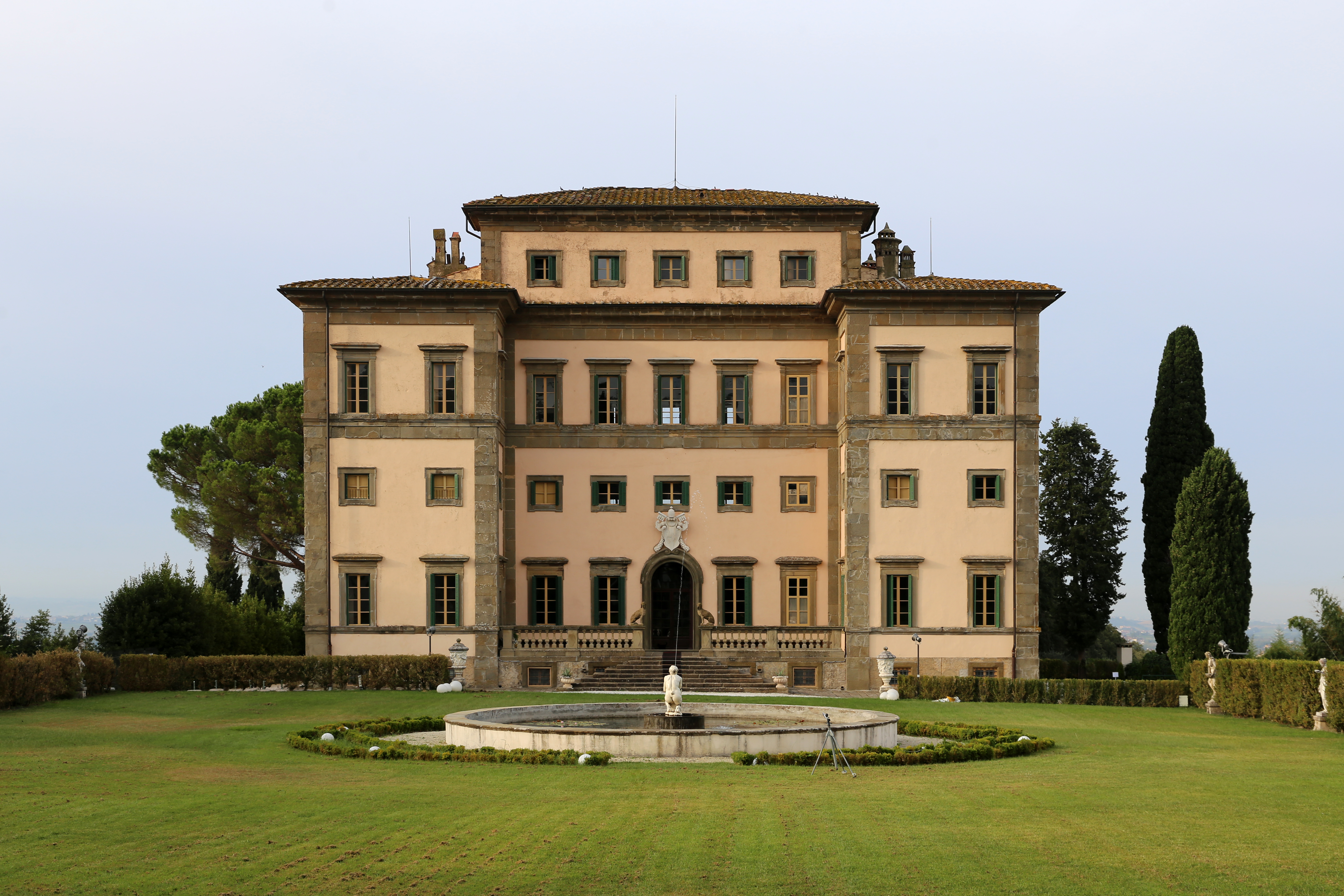
Villa Rospigliosi at Lamporecchio, Pistoia, designed by Gian Lorenzo Bernini

To the family were conferred several titles, as well as inheriting others via marriage. The papal branch, moved to Rome, has the princely title of Prince Rospigliosi in the Holy Roman Empire, Papal Prince Rospigliosi and Duke of Zagarolo, Prince of Castiglione, Marquis of Giuliana, Count of Chiusa and Baron of La Miraglia and Valcorrente in both the Kingdom of the Two Sicilies and the Kingdom of Italy, Lord of Aldone, Burgio, Contessa and Trappeto in the nobility of Rome, and Patrician of Venice, Genoa, Pistoia, Ferrara and Ravenna in the nobilities of both Venice and Genoa. Don Filippo Rospigliosi, a family member, is the present (12th) Earl of Newburgh in the Peerage of Scotland.

== See also ==
- Palazzo Pallavicini-Rospigliosi
- Pallavicini family
