= Pallavicini Collection =

Art collection of the Pallavicini family in Rome, originating in the 17th century

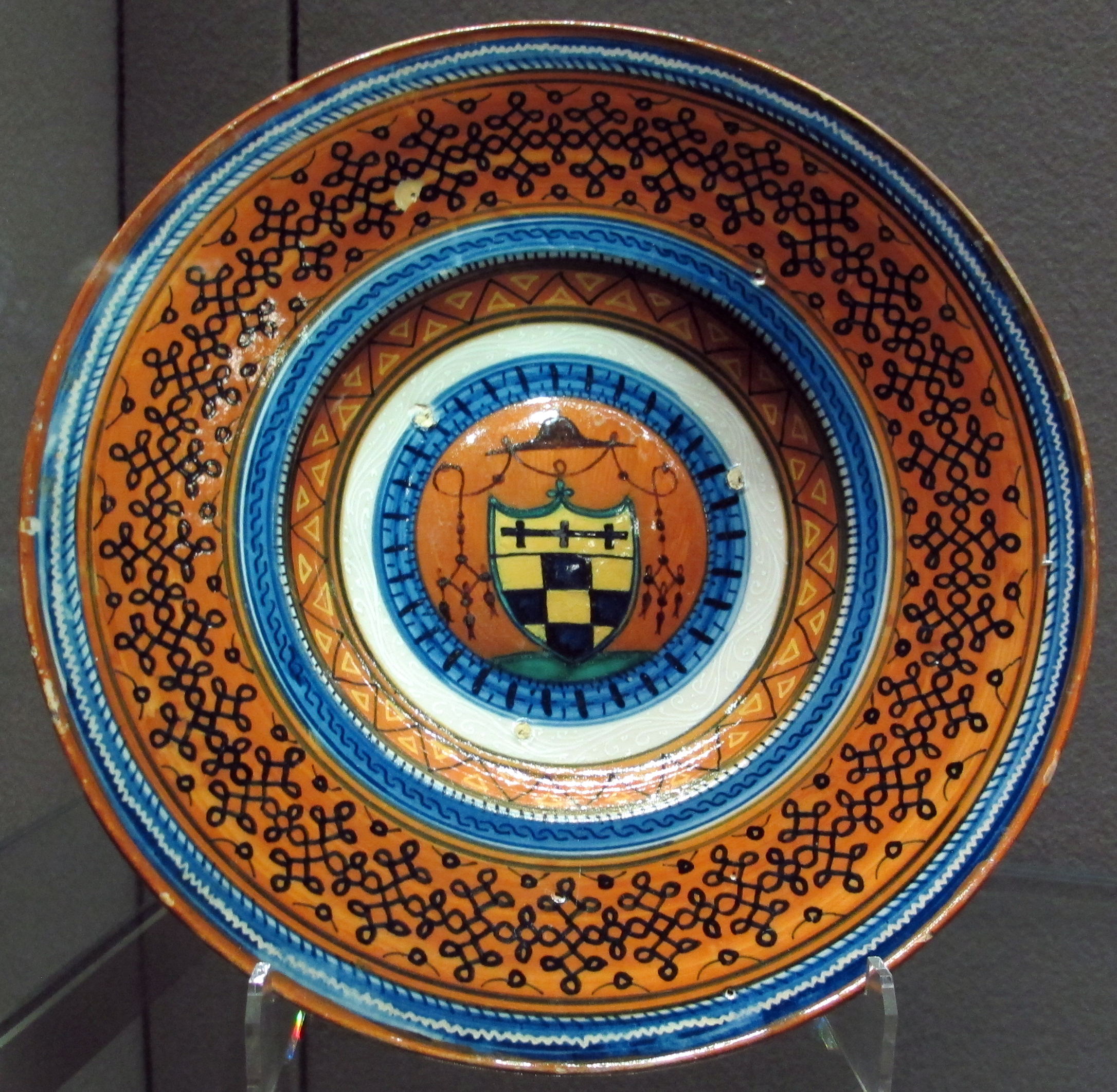
Coat of arms of the Pallavicini family

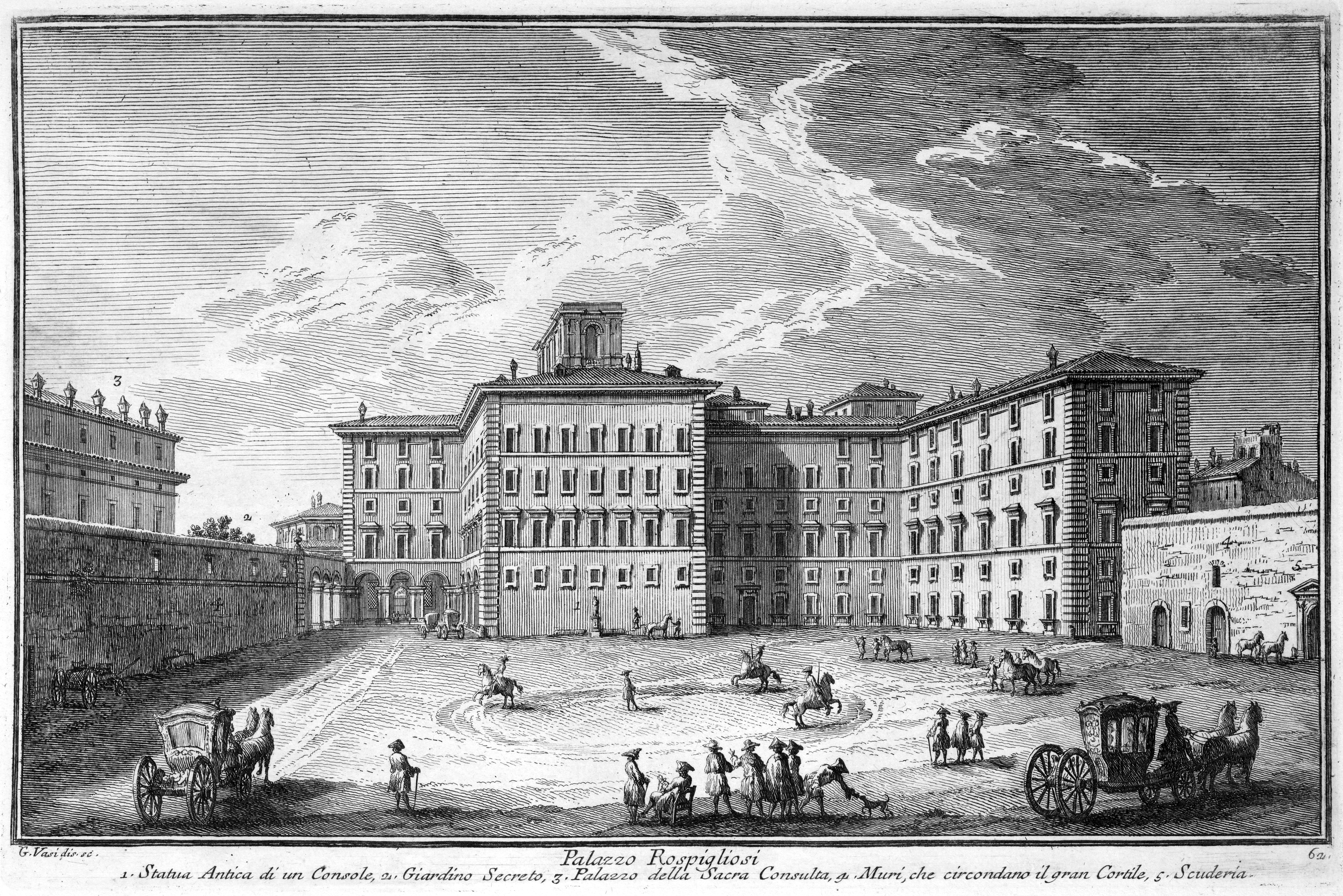
Palazzo Pallavicini Rospigliosi in an engraving by Giuseppe Vasi from 1754

The Pallavicini Collection is an art collection established in Rome during the 17th century and still owned today by the Pallavicini family, originally from Genoa.

The works in the collection, started by Cardinal Lazzaro Pallavicini, are now displayed in the Palazzo Pallavicini Rospigliosi, a monumental historic building that, from the 18th century, was shared by the two titular families that give it its name, with the Pallavicini still the legitimate owners of their premises. The two families established kinship ties and hereditary bonds that ended only in the mid-19th century; these led to intertwining and transfers of property and titles, determining over time the transfer of a substantial portion of the Rospigliosi Collection into the Pallavicini catalog.

With the collections of the Doria-Pamphilj and Colonna families, this is one of the largest private art collections in Rome, among the most notable of the Baroque period.

== History ==
=== Family background ===
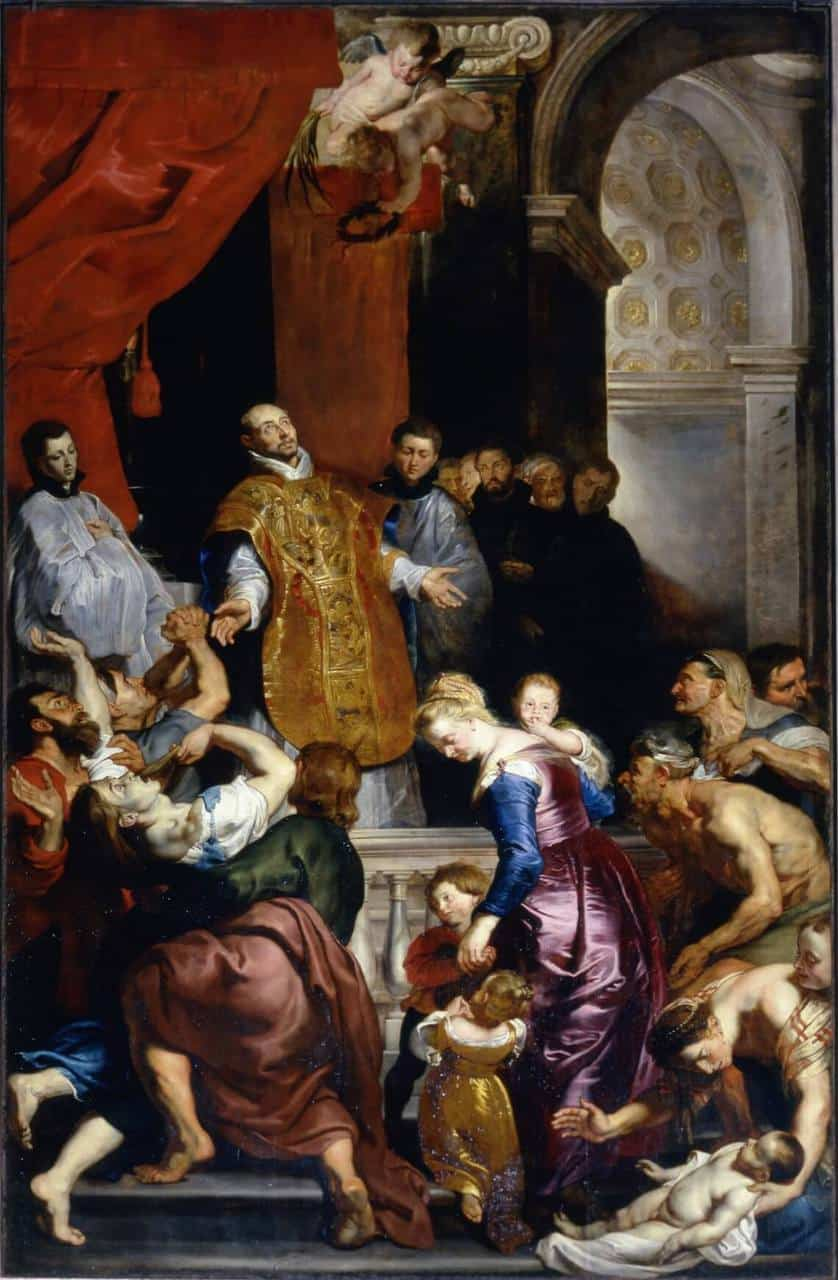
Miracoli di Sant’Ignazio di Loyola, Rubens (Chiesa del Gesù e dei Santi Ambrogio e Andrea, Genoa)

The Pallavicini family originates from Genoa, a city in whose republic some of its members already held prominent political roles by the 15th century. It was a dynasty that, like the Giustiniani, resulted from the union of several families, forming an albergo.

By the late 16th century, the Pallavicini name emerged in the artistic sphere through Marcello, who commissioned the construction of the Chiesa del Gesù e dei Santi Ambrogio e Andrea in Genoa. However, the person considered the initiator of the family's great successes was the marquis (and banker to the Duke of Mantua) Niccolò, who, for the same church, commissioned Rubens first, in 1608, with the altarpiece of The Circumcision, and later, in 1620, with the large canvas of the Miracoli di Sant'Ignazio for a side chapel.

Niccolò Pallavicini had 22 children with his wife Maria Lomellini, including Lazzaro and Stefano, who settled in Rome, establishing the dynasty and the art collection now known in the family's palace in the city. Niccolò's brothers, meanwhile, continued the Genoese branch, whose male line went extinct in 1741.

=== 17th century ===
==== Pallavicini in Rome ====
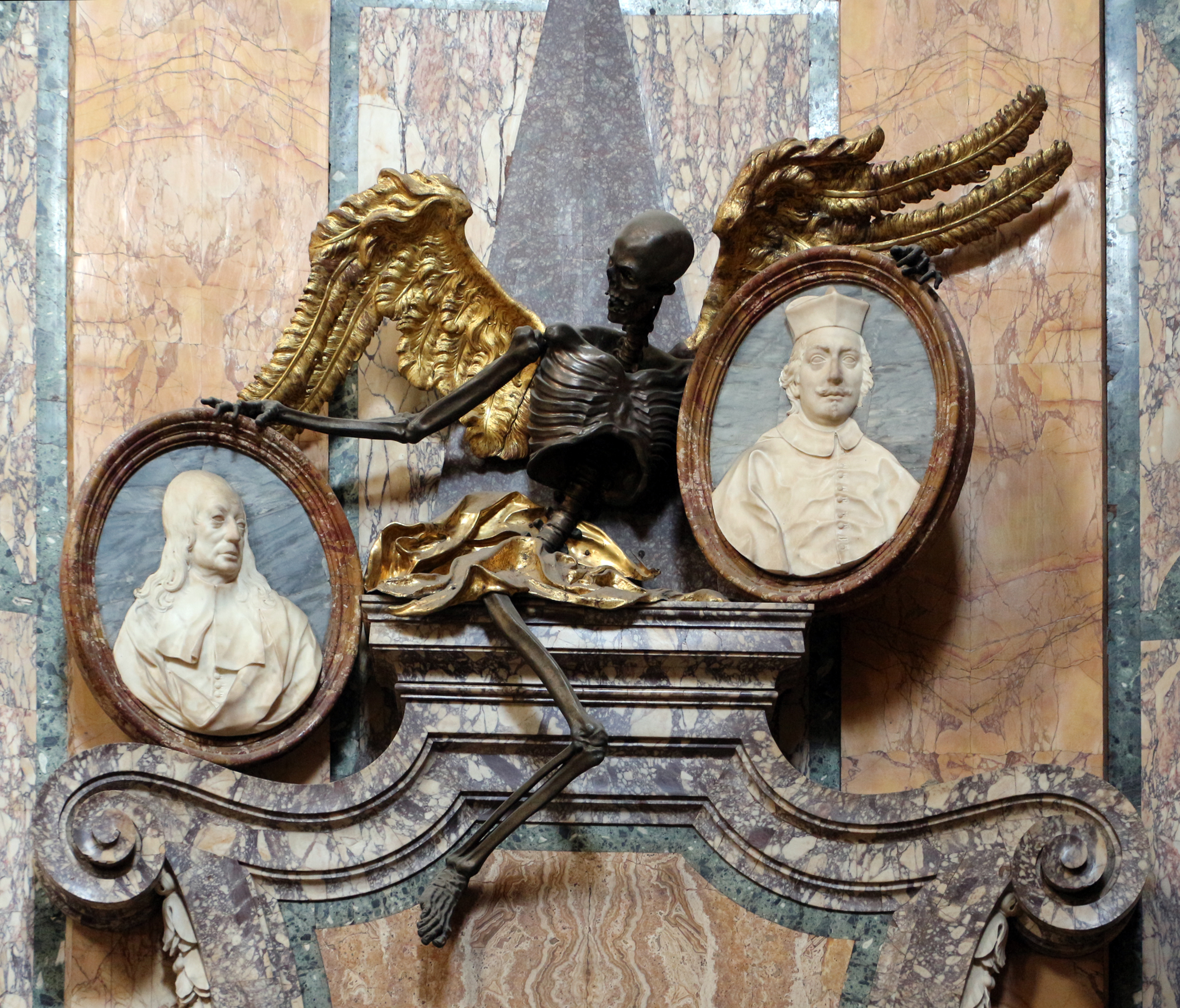
Stefano and Lazzaro Pallavicini, detail of the funerary monument (San Francesco a Ripa, Rome)

In 1665, Stefano, still in Genoa, added two groups of works to the collection: the series of the Christ with the twelve Apostles by Rubens, and a series of French tapestries made from cartoons by Raphael.

The Rubens paintings, already part of the collection of his father Niccolò, were later transferred to the collection of Giovan Battista Pallavicini (another brother of Lazzaro and Stefano, who settled in Antwerp and acquired the canvases to place them in the private chapel of his palace in the Flemish city), where they remained until at least 1665, as upon his death, per his wishes, they were transferred to Stefano in Genoa.

The cartoons by Raphael, centered on the Acts of the Apostles, followed a similar path to the Rubens series, except for their final destination, as they were never brought to the papal capital but were instead destined for the Basilica of the Holy House in Loreto.

Lazzaro Pallavicini, born in Genoa in 1602, arrived in Rome when young. In 1669 he was appointed to cardinal by Pope Clement IX Rospigliosi and began collecting his first works of art. Shortly thereafter, he called his brother Stefano and Stefano's only daughter, Maria Camilla, to Rome, in order to let the Pallavicini family ascend within the aristocratic dynamics of Rome, promoting the marriage of Maria Camilla to Giovanni Battista Rospigliosi, the great-nephew of Clement IX.

All three Pallavicini settled in the city at the palace formerly owned by the Barberini family at the Monte di Pietà, known as the Barberini great house and purchased in 1674 by Stefano for twenty years' use for 50,000 scudi. During this period, the collections of Lazzaro and Stefano were united for the first time; although in 1679 the Rubens series was transferred to Rome and placed under Cardinal Lazzaro.

The marriage of Maria Camilla and Giovanni Battista took place, and thus the wealth of the Roman Pallavicini branch of Lazzaro and Stefano passed entirely to Maria Camilla, who was also named the beneficiary of a special fideicommissum that served to safeguard Lazzaro's entire legacy, as well as the family name and titles, for future generations.

At that time, Lazzaro's collection consisted of a substantial group of works from the Roman and Emilian Baroque, the latter acquired directly in Bologna during his tenure (between 1670 and 1673) as papal vice-legate, including works by artists such as the Carracci (notably the Mangiafagioli by Annibale Carracci), Sisto Badalocchio, Guido Reni, Francesco Albani, and others.

==== Rospigliosi-Pallavicini connection ====
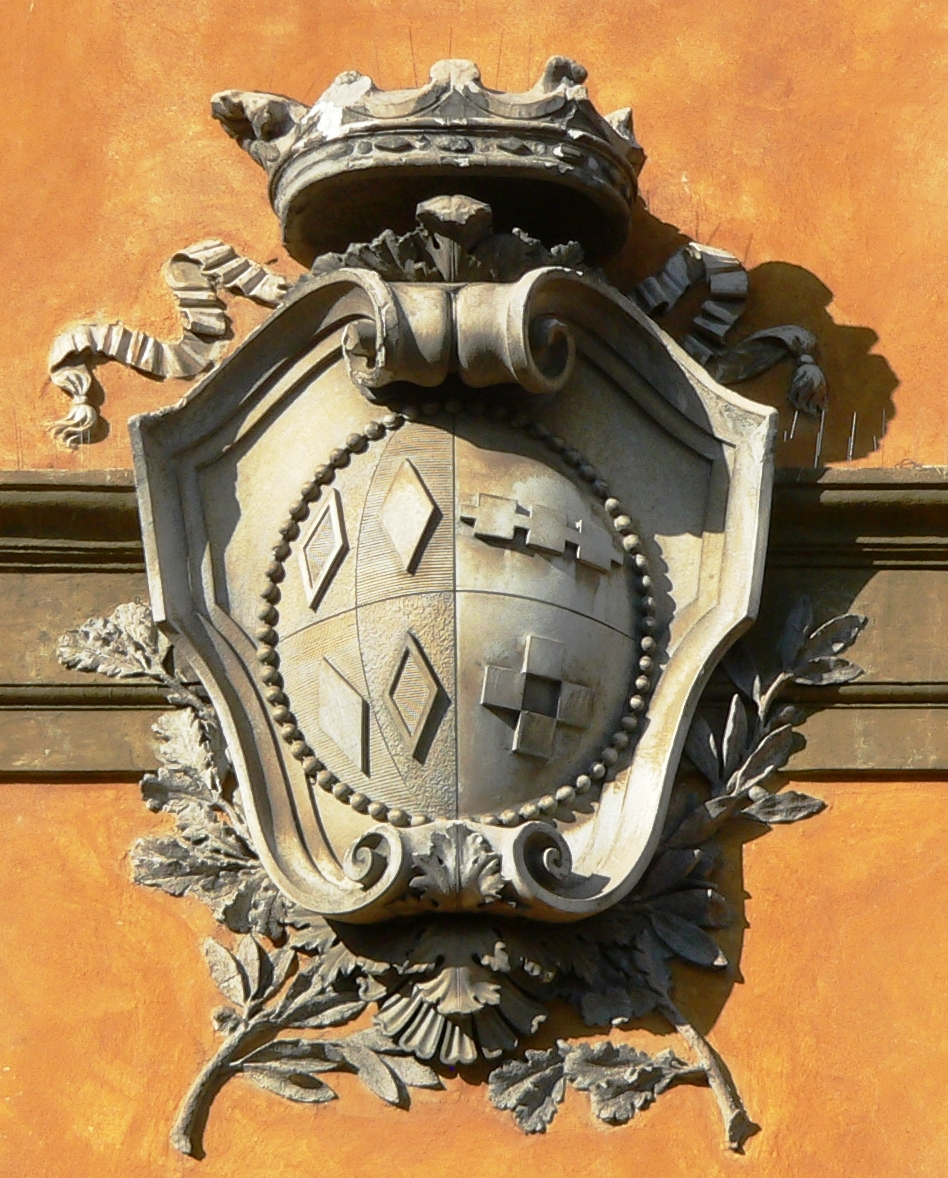
Rospigliosi-Pallavicini coat of arms

Lacking male heirs in Rome, Lazzaro established a fideicommissum in 1679 that tied all his properties and wealth to the second-born son of his niece Maria Camilla and her husband Rospigliosi.

The testamentary provision stipulated that Lazzaro's collection, largely inherited from his father Niccolò, along with the family titles, be assigned to the second male son of Giovanni Battista Rospigliosi and Maria Camilla, who would bear the Pallavicini surname to continue the Roman branch of the Genoese family (while the firstborn would continue the Rospigliosi line). If the couple had only one male son, he would bear both the Pallavicini and Rospigliosi titles until the birth of a second male son, who would then receive the Pallavicini inheritance, while if he remained the only male, he would retain both names until the determination of his offspring, upon which the general rules of the fideicommissum would apply (i.e., the first male would receive the Rospigliosi inheritance from the father, while the second would receive the Pallavicini inheritance from the mother). If the couple had only a daughter, she would pass her entire Rospigliosi-Pallavicini inheritance to her husband until the determination of their offspring, upon which the previous conditions of the fideicommissum would apply.

==== Maria Camilla Pallavicini ====
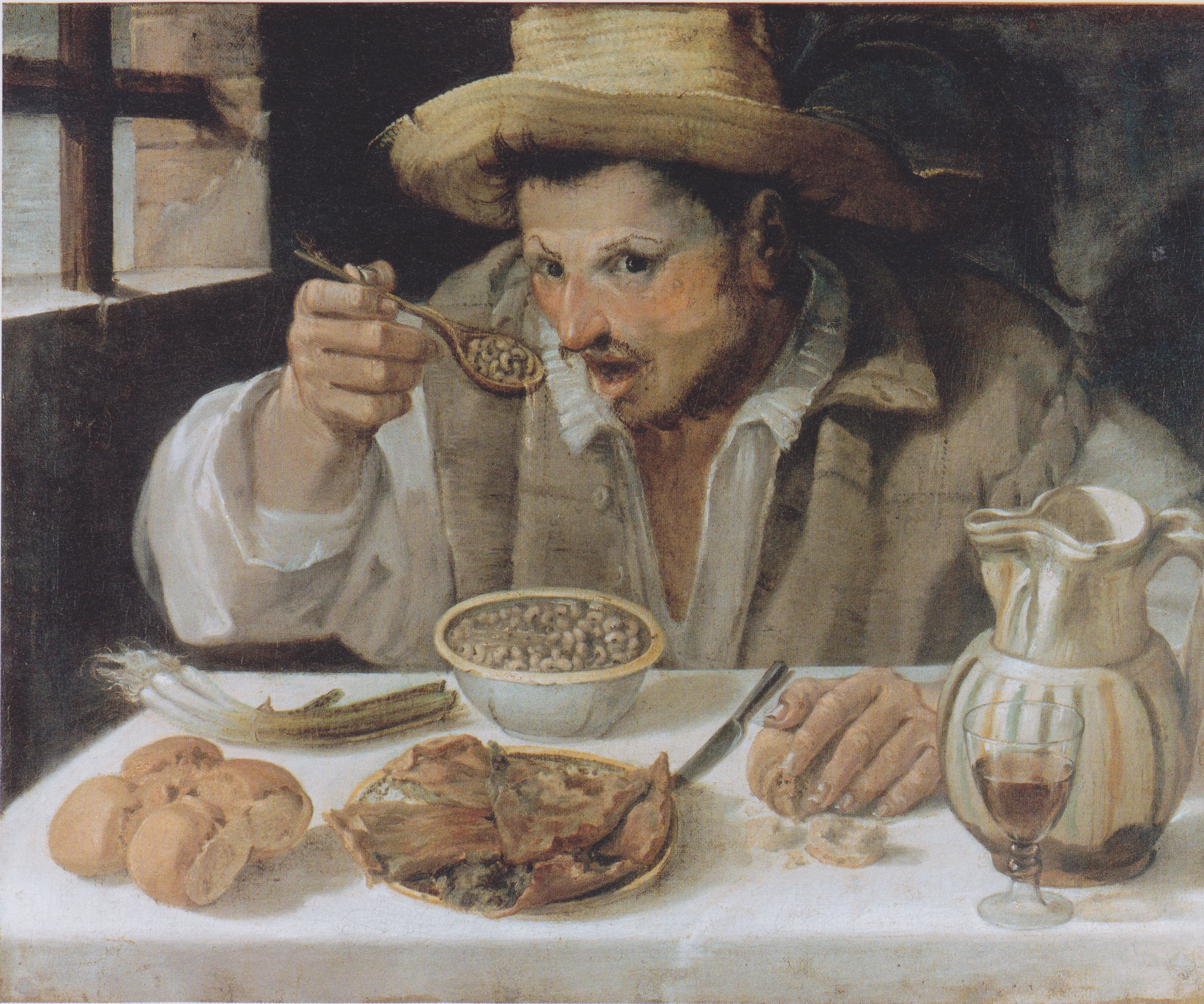
Mangiafagioli, Annibale Carracci (formerly in the collection of Lazzaro Pallavicini)

In 1680, the cardinal died, and a few months later his brother Stefano died too, leaving the principality of Gallicano to his daughter. Maria Camilla received a rich art collection, whose core still forms a substantial part of the Pallavicini Gallery, bound by her uncle Lazzaro's testamentary fideicommissum.

Maria Camilla was also vigorous in expanding the collection: between 1694 and 1699, she acquired the Peccato originale by Domenichino, two canvases by Luca Giordano, the Conversione di Saulo and Giuliano l'Apostata, a series of still lifes by Tamm and Bogelaer, a series of battle scenes by Christian Reder, and a series of landscapes by van Bloemen. Among the works that left the collection, the most notable of the period was the Mangiafagioli by Annibale Carracci, which first entered the private collection of Niccolò Maria Pallavicini (Maria Camilla's Genoese cousin, also the namesake of the couple's second-born son, who owned the Niccolò Maria Pallavicini Collection that, upon his death, was not kept within the family but dismantled and sold on the European market), and then joined the Colonna Collection, where it remains in the palace at Piazza Santi Apostoli in Rome.

In 1694, the Barberini great house was reclaimed by its previous owners under a clause in the agreement.

=== 18th century ===
==== Palace on the Quirinal ====
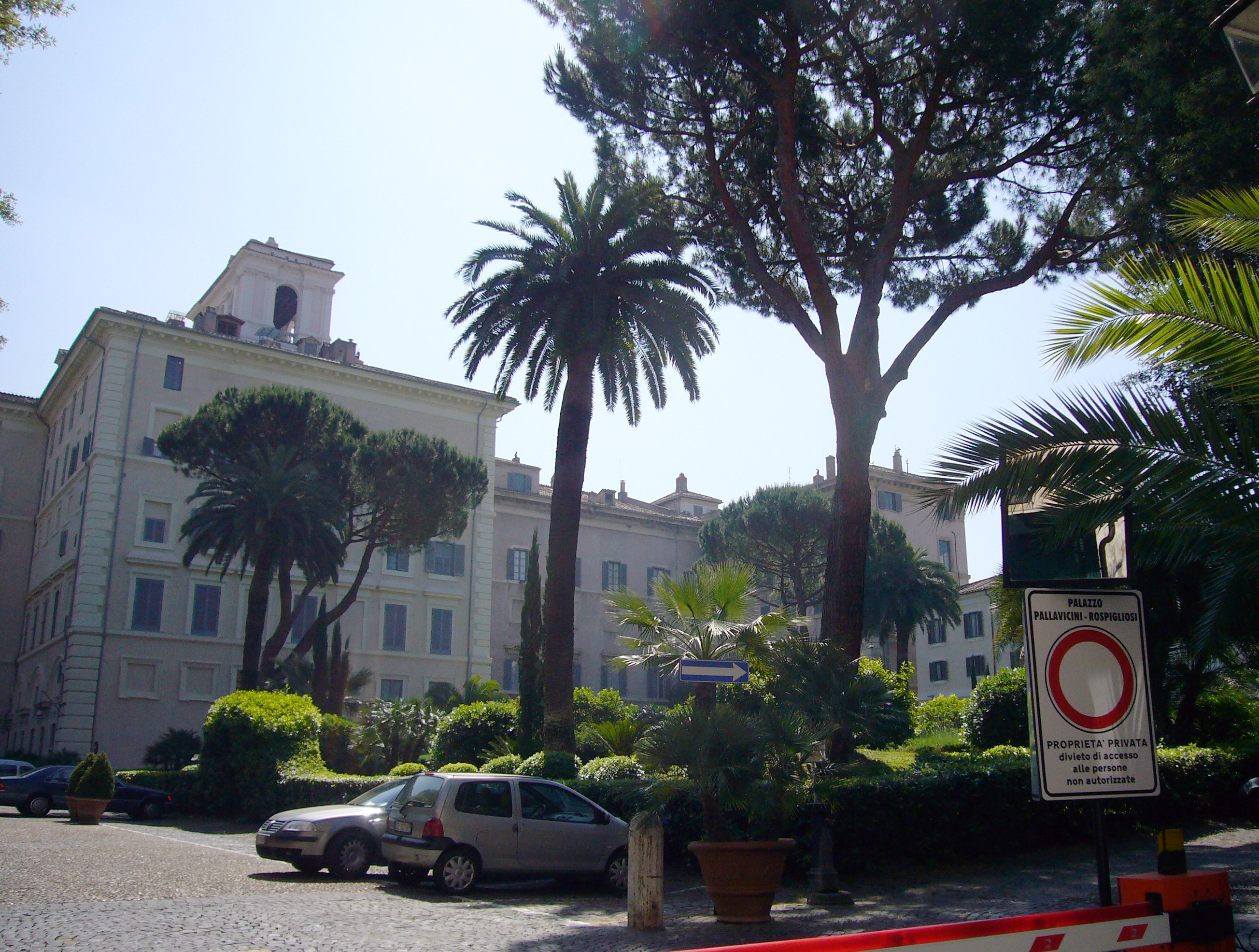
Palazzo Pallavicini Rospigliosi, Rome

Thanks to Maria Camilla, the family purchased, between 1704 and 1708, the palace near the Quirinal previously owned by the Borghese family from Gianni Ippolito Mancini.

The building was then shared by the families of the two spouses who inhabited it: the Pallavicini, who received the piano nobile and two garden terraces, along with the Casino dell'Aurora and the Loggia delle Muse, and the Rospigliosi, who were assigned the ground floor and the third level of the building. The Pallavicini Gallery was placed from the outset on the piano nobile, while the works of the Rospigliosi Collection were housed on the third floor (now corresponding to the fourth).

==== Pallavicini-Rospigliosi heirs ====
Maria Camilla's died in 1710; her will expressed the desire for her father and uncle to be buried in the family chapel of the Church of San Francesco a Ripa in Rome, in a single large monument. Her husband, respecting his wife's wishes, commissioned (between 1713 and 1719) the sculptor Giuseppe Mazzuoli to create the work on one wall of the chapel, while opposite, he requested the erection of another funerary monument dedicated to Maria Camilla and himself.

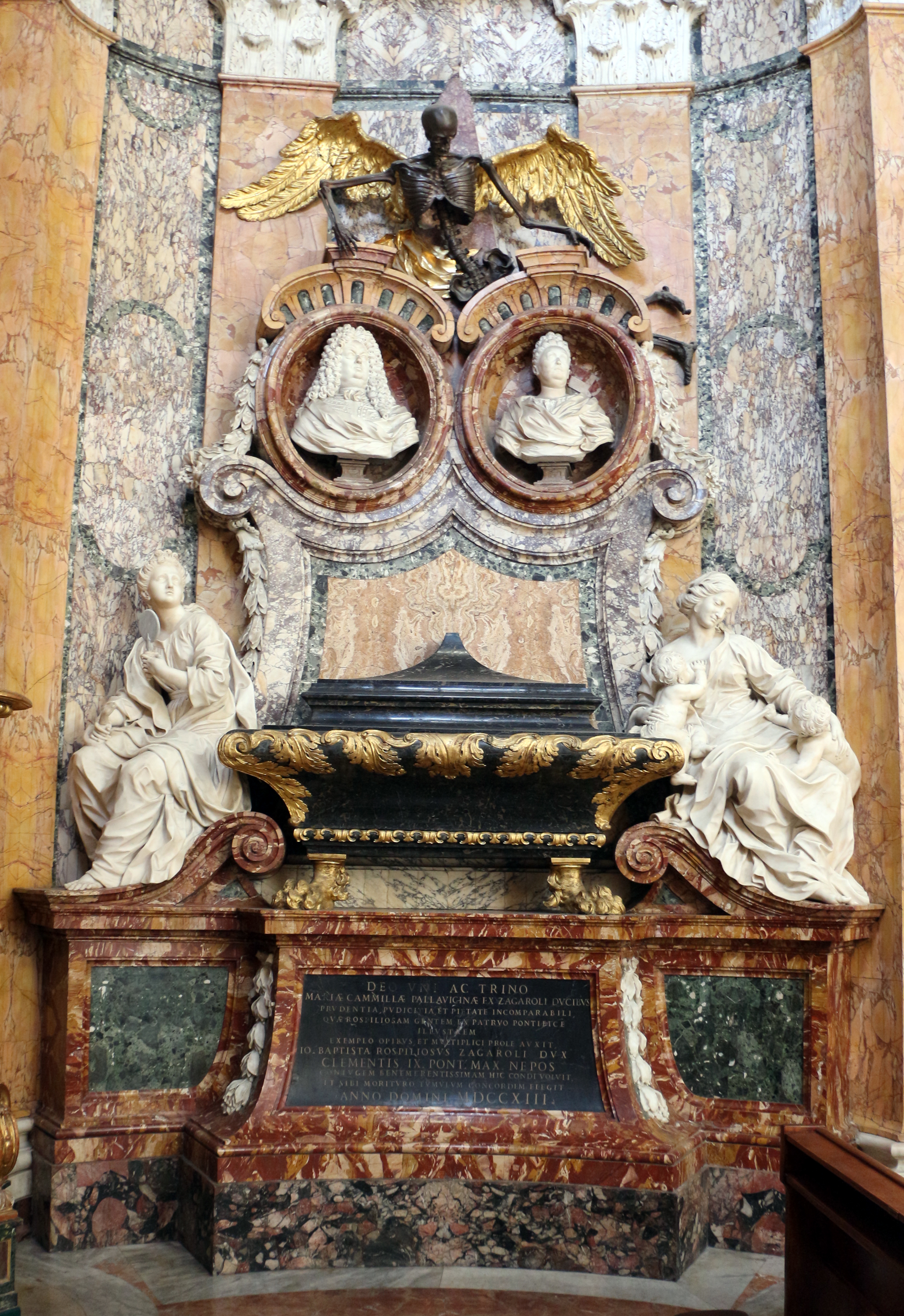
Funerary monument to Maria Camilla Pallavicini and Giovanni Battista Rospigliosi (Church of San Francesco a Ripa, Rome)

In 1722, Giovanni Battista Rospigliosi also died, and the couple's second son, Niccolò Maria, became the heir to Lazzaro's legacy, taking both the Pallavicini surname and titles. The art collection, which had meanwhile grown, was divided between Niccolò and his elder brother, Clemente Domenico Rospigliosi, who inherited the Rospigliosi titles. Both brothers equally shared the entire Rospigliosi-Pallavicini Collection accumulated up to that point, while the paintings tied to Lazzaro's legacy were exclusively assigned to Niccolò Maria, per the fideicommissum agreements.

Niccolò Maria, married to Vittoria Altieri, died in 1759 without heirs, and the collection was thus merged with the Rospigliosi collection and entrusted to Giovanni Battista Rospigliosi, the second son of Niccolò's elder brother (Clemente Domenico Rospigliosi). Giovanni Battista died in 1784, leaving several significant additions, including family portraits, a group of canvases by David Loreti, and other works by 17th-century Roman-Emilian artists.

He had two sons with Eleonora Caffarelli: first Giuseppe Rospigliosi (who continued the Rospigliosi line) and secondly Luigi, to whom the Pallavicini inheritance was entrusted.

Each brother initiated some disposals of his inherited collection, as, by the late 18th century and early 19th, with the advent of the Roman Republic and French insurrections, Roman patrician families faced heavy taxation that led to the more or less forced sale of entire portions of their properties (a similar fate befell the Borghese, Giustiniani, Pamphilj, and others).

=== 19th century ===
==== Additions under Giuseppe Rospigliosi ====
In the early decades of the 19th century the most forward-thinking vision was that of Duke Giuseppe, who made several acquisitions to restore the collection's prestige. In 1816, he purchased in Florence the Derelitta, the small triptych with the Transfiguration of Christ, Saint Jerome, and Saint Augustine, and the tondo with the Virgin, all by Sandro Botticelli, and the Triumph of Chastity by Lorenzo Lotto (all now part of the Pallavicini Collection).

Giuseppe died in 1833, his brother Luigi just two years later: the two collections were thus reunited under Giuseppe's firstborn, Giulio Cesare Rospigliosi, as the two Pallavicini sons, Benedetto and Filippo, had predeceased their father.

==== Final separation of the Pallavicini-Rospigliosi branches ====
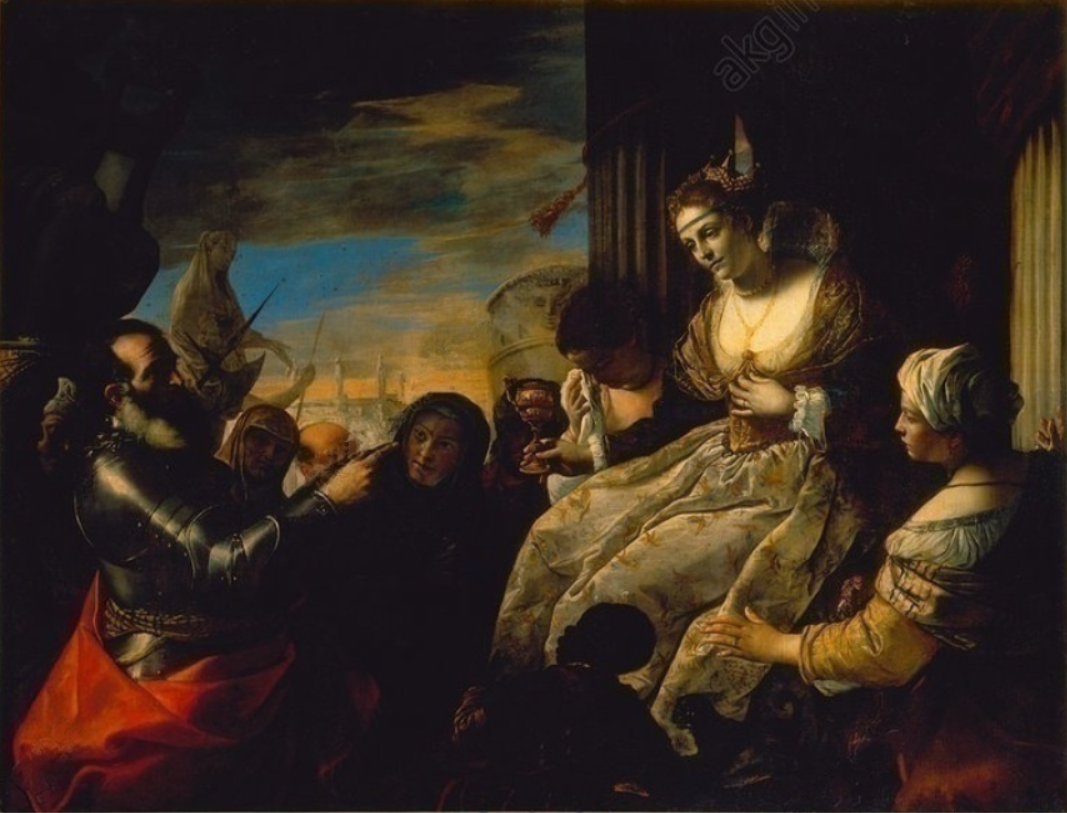
Death of Sophonisba, Mattia Preti

Under Giulio Cesare, the Rospigliosi-Pallavicini Collection was enriched by a significant bequest from the Colonna Collection (about 130 to 150 paintings, of which about seventy entered the Pallavicini Collection). More precisely, Giulio Cesare first acquired the bequest inherited by his wife Margherita Colonna Gioeni, one of the three daughters of Filippo III (1779–1816), 12th Prince and Duke of Paliano, consisting of a third of the collection not subject to the family's fideicommissum. Subsequently, in 1841, he also bought the bequest of one of his two sisters-in-law, Maria, married to Giulio Lante della Rovere, which included works such as the Rissa by Diego Velázquez; the Holy Family by Ortolano; the Temple of Venus by Claude Lorrain; the Rape of Europa, of Ganymede, and of Proserpina by Mattia Preti (all three now in the Pallavicini Gallery); and several landscapes by Gaspar van Wittel, Gaspard Dughet, Jan and Pieter van Bloemen, and Andrea Locatelli.

Giulio Cesare also laid the groundwork for separating the two families through his two sons. Upon his death in 1859, the two art collections were definitively separated, never again to be managed by a single family representative: the Rospigliosi Collection was inherited by the firstborn Clemente Rospigliosi, while the Pallavicini Collection went to Francesco, from whom the still-existing branch that continues to hold the art collection and the Pallavicini portion of the Quirinal palace descends.

=== 20th century ===
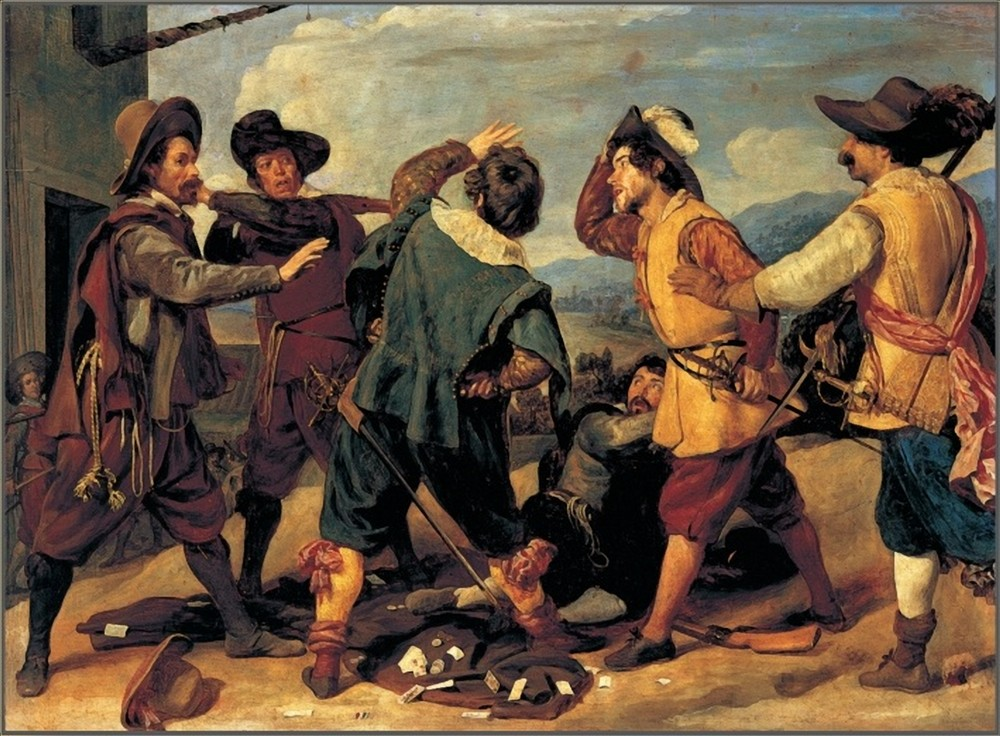
Rissa, Velázquez

During the early 20th century, the Rospigliosi family faced a financial collapse from which they never recovered, leading to the almost total loss of their art collection (in two major auctions in 1931 and 1932) and their properties, including their part of the Palazzo Pallavicini Rospigliosi. The latter became, for many years, the headquarters of the Federconsorzi, which leased the premises starting in 1939 and later inherited the rights; after the federation of agricultural consortia went bankrupt in 1992, the floors of the palace previously belonging to the Rospigliosi passed in 1995 to the ownership of Coldiretti, which also became the owner of the art collection, consisting of over one hundred paintings on the fourth floor of the building, inaccessible to the public.

In contrast, the Pallavicini family managed to preserve its wealth intact, including its art collection and Roman noble property. During the 20th century, the collection passed from Francesco to his grandson Guglielmo Pierre de Bernis de Courtarvel, and, upon his death in 1940, to his wife, the Genoese Elvina Pallavicini del Vascello, then to their only daughter Maria Camilla, and finally to the current heirs.

The Pallavicini Collection remains one of the few 17th-century Roman collections that has remained almost entirely intact since its establishment: it currently includes over 540 pieces, including paintings, drawings, and sculptures, housed between the piano nobile of the Palazzo Pallavicini Rospigliosi in Rome and the Casino dell'Aurora, also under their ownership. The paintings collected by Cardinal Lazzaro, subject to the historic 1679 fideicommissum, still form the core of the Roman collection: a substantial group of canvases comes from the collection of his brother Stefano, while another originates from the years when Lazzaro was papal legate in Bologna, including Emilian artists such as the Carracci, Sisto Badalocchio, Guido Reni, and Francesco Albani. Another group of paintings comes from commissions directly ordered by Maria Camilla Pallavicini, a figure highly attentive to art, while others were previously part of the Rospigliosi Collection or acquired through its members, particularly Giovanni Battista Rospigliosi and Giuseppe Rospigliosi, through whom works by Pietro da Cortona, Poussin, Botticelli, Lorenzo Lotto, Velázquez, Rubens, Domenichino, Luca Signorelli, and Guercino entered the collection.

== See also ==
- Pallavicini (family)
- Palazzo Pallavicini Rospigliosi
- Rospigliosi (family)

== Bibliography ==
- Negro, A. (1999). La collezione Rospigliosi. La quadreria e la committenza artistica di una famiglia patrizia a Roma nel Sei e Settecento [The Rospigliosi Collection. The Gallery and Artistic Patronage of a Patrician Family in Rome in the 17th and 18th Centuries] (in Italian). Argos. ISBN 978-8885897786.
- Haskell, Francis; Montanari, Tomaso (2019). Mecenati e pittori. L'arte e la società italiana nell'epoca barocca [Patrons and Painters. Art and Italian Society in the Baroque Era] (in Italian). Turin: Einaudi. ISBN 978-88-062-4215-2.
- Zeri, Federico (1959). La Galleria Pallavicini in Roma. Catalogo dei dipinti [The Pallavicini Gallery in Rome. Catalog of Paintings] (in Italian). Florence: Sansoni.
- Cappelletti, Francesca (2014). La collezione Pallavicini e il palazzo del giardino a Montecavallo [The Pallavicini Collection and the Palace of the Garden at Montecavallo] (in Italian). Rome: Campisano.
