= Aurora (Reni) =

Painting by Guido Reni

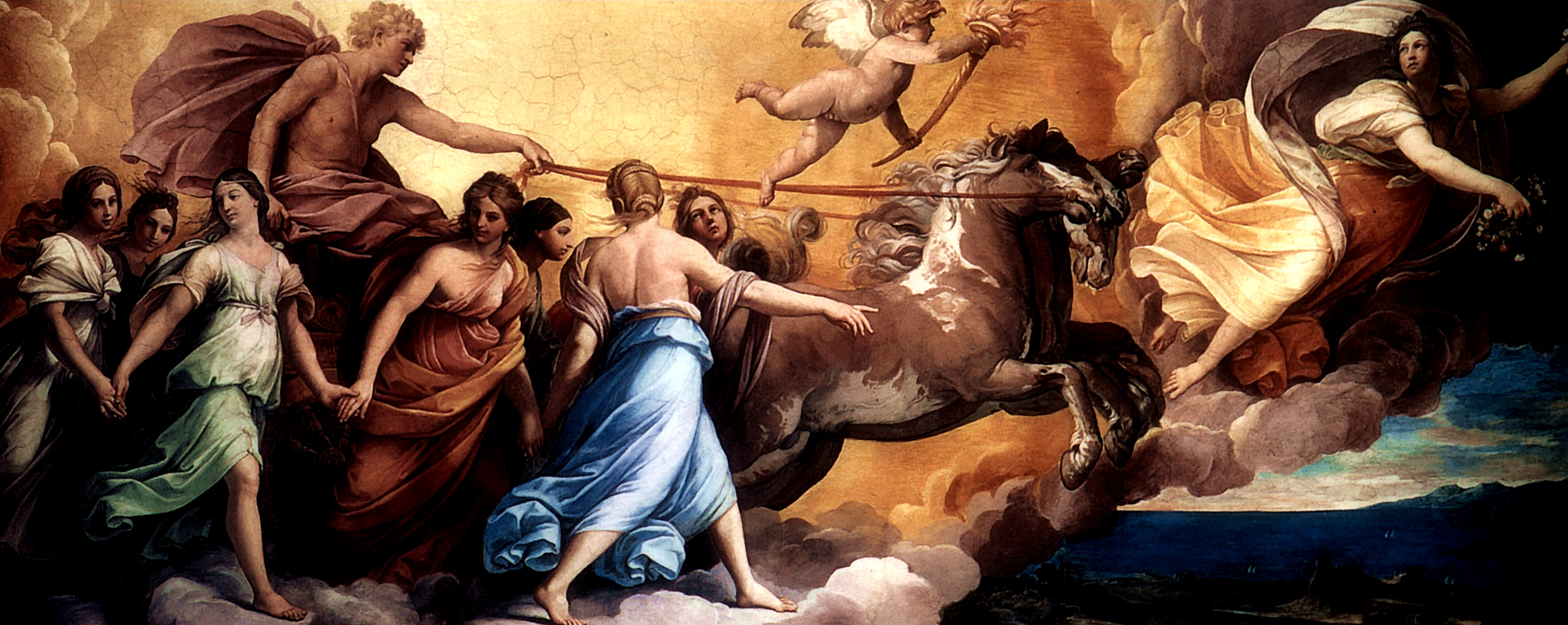
Aurora (1614) by Guido Reni

L'Aurora (Aurora) is a large Baroque ceiling fresco painted in 1614 by Guido Reni for the Casino, or garden house, adjacent to the Palazzo Pallavicini-Rospigliosi, in Rome. The work is considered Reni's fresco masterpiece.

== Casino dell'Aurora ==
The casino and the paintings were commissioned by the Cardinal Scipione Borghese, a prominent art patron, and designed by Giovanni Vasanzio and Carlo Maderno, and the rear overlooks the Piazza del Quirinale in Rome. The facade is towards the small garden next to the palace. On the walls of the room are four frescoes of the Seasons by Paul Bril, and two Triumphs by Antonio Tempesta.

== The Aurora fresco ==
The ceiling fresco is 2.8 metres (9.2 ft) tall and 7 metres (23 ft) wide. It is displayed within a painted frame or quadro riportato and depicts from right to left, Aurora (Dawn) in a golden billowing dress with her garlands flying over a dim-lit landscape, leading a blond Apollo in his horse-drawn chariot, surrounded by a chain of female "hours", bringing light to the world. It could also be described as the Triumph of Apollo led by the Aurora. Above the quadriga, in the sky, flies the putto Phosphorus with a torch. Zephyrs blow winds at either end.

One interpretation of the work is that the incorporated heraldic symbols were meant to link the patron Scipione with Apollo, his patronage bringing "light to the darkness". It may have served to uphold the ravenous Borghese accumulation of classical antiquities.

The style of the work is classically restrained and mimics poses from ancient Roman sarcophagi, that were on display in the cardinal's collection. Others have noted how the painting echoes in part a bas-relief at the Arch of Constantine showing Apollo in a Quadriga with Phosphorus.

The chariot procession recalls the central fresco in The Loves of the Gods, painted by Annibale Carracci in the Farnese Palace, which depicts the Triumph of Bacchus and Ariadne; however, here there is far more classical sobriety in a restricted number of figures, with little emotion, without overemphasizing muscular anatomy, and hearkening beyond mannerism back to a high-renaissance restraint. The quadriga prances in unison; the maiden hours gambol at a placid pace.

There is little attention to perspective, and if anything the vibrantly colored style is an affront to the violence and tenebrism displayed by Caravaggio and his followers, despite this being a pavilion commissioned by one of Caravaggio's early patrons, Scipione Borghese. It is unclear how the fresco relates to the paintings on the walls by Paolo Brill. On the other hand, the contemporary frescoes by Antonio Tempesta also depict triumphs: on the right a Roman general in a triumph and crowned by winged Victory. On the left, a Triumph of Love.

A fresco depicting "Aurora in her Chariot" was completed in 1621 by Guercino for the Casino di Villa Boncompagni Ludovisi.
