= Palazzo Barberini ai Giubbonari =

Palace in Rome, Italy

Coordinates: 41.8945°N 12.4733°E

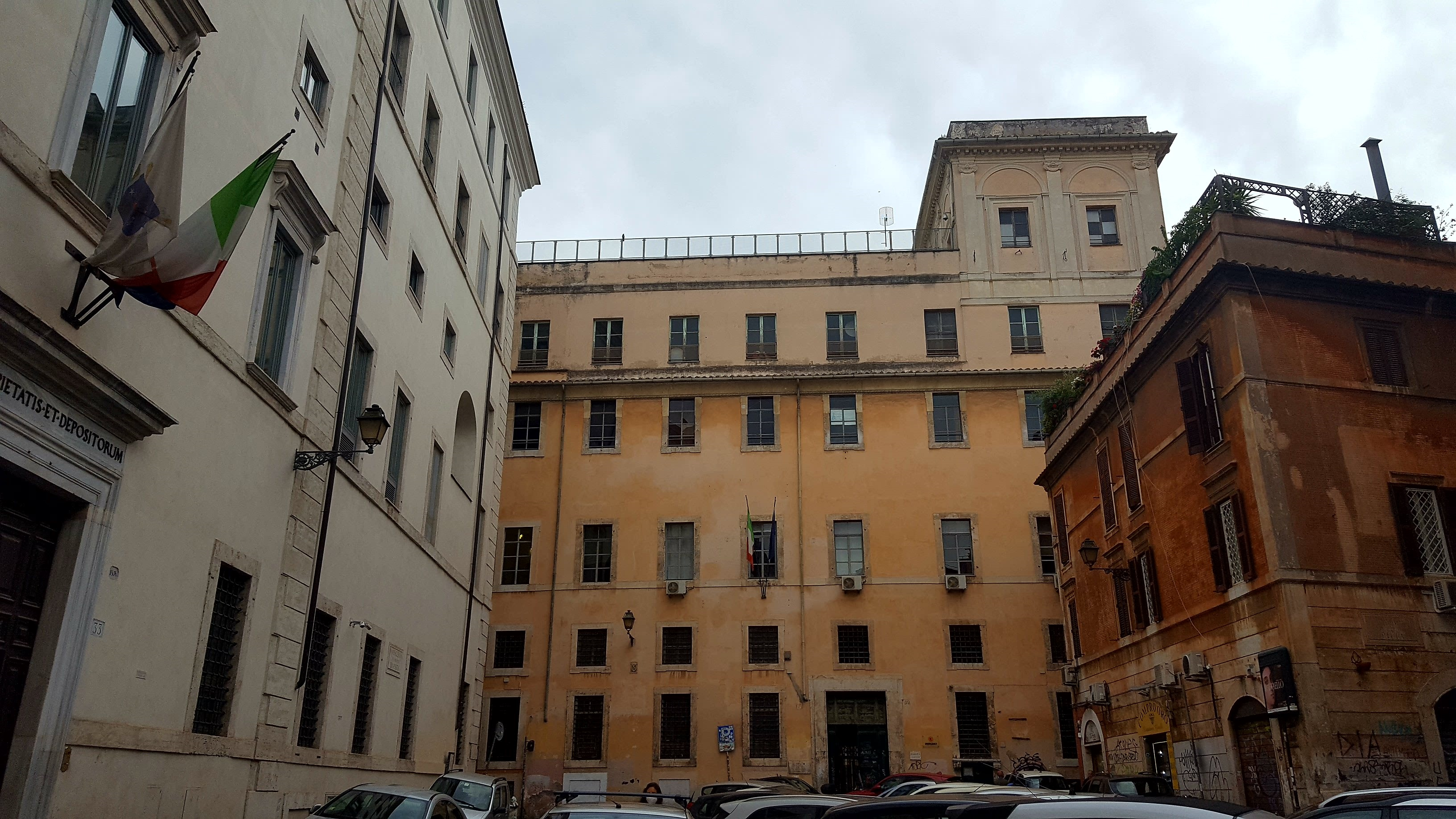
- The facade on Piazza del Monte di Pietà
- Interactive map of the Palazzo Barberini ai Giubbonari area

General information
- Status: In use
- Location: Via dell'Arco del Monte 99, Rome, Italy
- Year built: 16th century – 19th century
- Client: Barberini family
- Owner: Metropolitan City of Rome Capital

Design and construction
- Architects: Annibale Lippi; Flaminio Ponzio; Giovanni Maria Bonazzini; Francesco Contini; Nicola Giansimoni

Palazzo Barberini ai Giubbonari, also called Casa Grande Barberini, to distinguish it from the more famous palace in the Trevi district, is a historic palace in Rome. It was the family's first residence in the papal capital and, even after the construction of the palace at the Quattro Fontane, it remained the home of Taddeo, prince of Palestrina, until he fled to France. The palace remained the property of the Barberini family until the fourth decade of the eighteenth century, when they sold it to the Discalced Carmelites, who made it the seat of their General Curia; later passed to the Monte di Pietà, it is now owned by the municipality of Rome and home to educational institutions, including the Vittoria Colonna High School.

== History ==
=== Barberini (1581–1734) ===
==== Monsignor Francesco ====
The palace, in its residential phase, slowly took shape over the course of nearly eighty years (1581-1658) and four generations with numerous successive purchases of neighboring houses, enlarging in parallel with the growing fortunes of the Barberini family. The starting point for the construction was the purchase, on June 15, 1581, of a house with four stores on the ground floor owned by the Scapucci family by Monsignor Francesco Barberini (1528-1600), a protonotary apostolic and the prime mover in the incorporation of the household into Roman society. The monsignor, who in 1584 had his nephew Maffeo come to Rome to study at the Roman College, perfected the project in the following years by buying new houses bordering his own on Via dei Giubbonari, in the direction of what is now Piazza Cairoli, and entrusting Annibale Lippi with the arrangement of the first and second floors around a courtyard, with four rooms and a hall each.

==== Maffeo ====
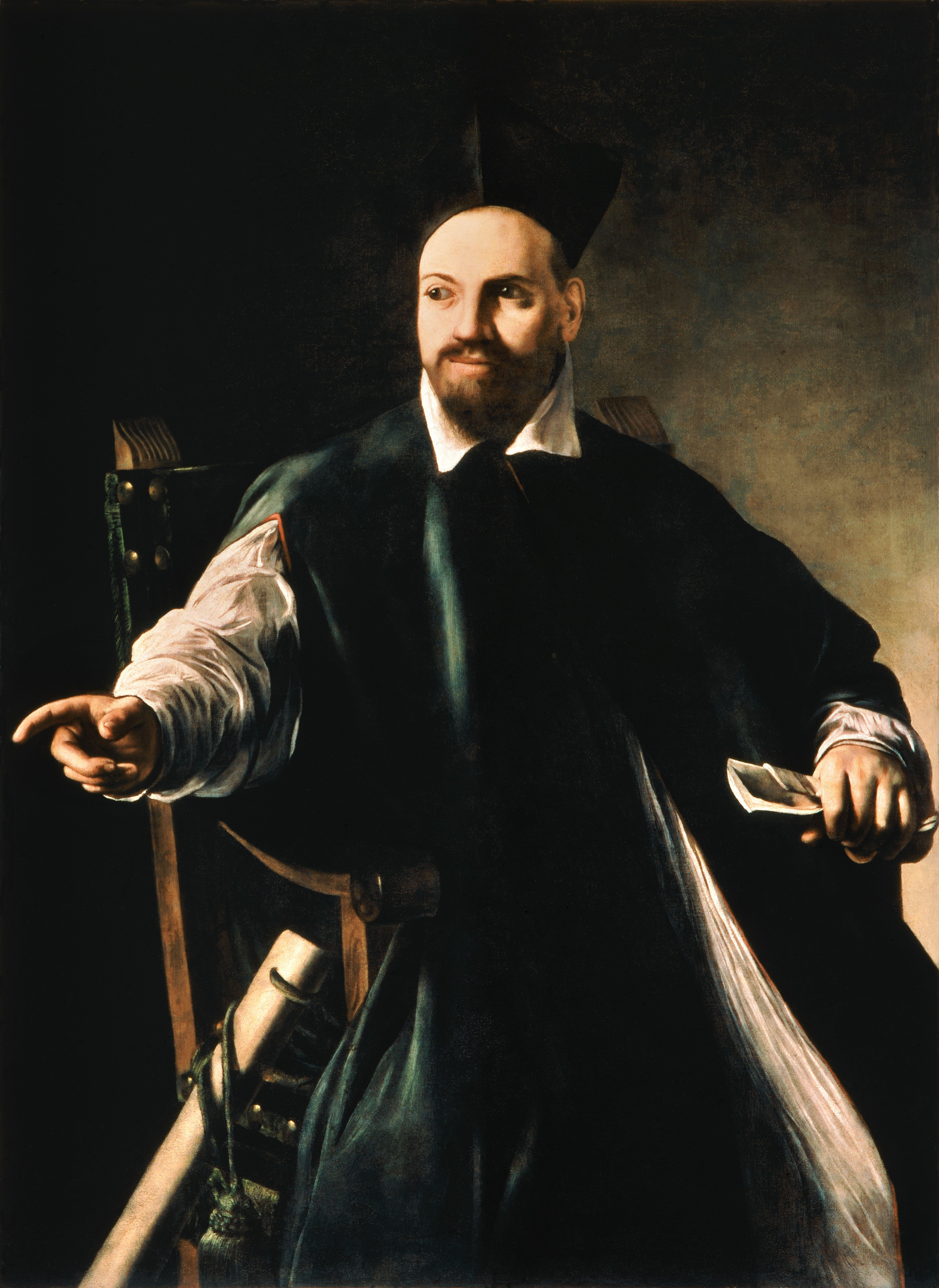
Maffeo Barberini portrayed by Caravaggio during the years when he lived in Palazzo ai Giubbonari

When Francesco died, the property remained entirely in the hands of his nephew Maffeo, at that period a protonotary apostolic and chamber cleric and by then launched toward a rapid career as a prelate due in part to the considerable finances left to him by his uncle (calculated at more than 100,000 scudi of movable property, in addition to houses at the Giubbonari and two farmhouses near Rome). Monsignor Maffeo called his closest relatives to Rome and, between 1600 and 1603, commissioned work on the building to house them, under the direction of Flaminio Ponzio, valued at 2600 scudi. After his appointment as cardinal in 1606, Maffeo (who, engaged in diplomatic and government missions in Paris and Bologna, and residing in his diocese of Spoleto, rarely lived in Rome in the years between 1601 and 1617) rented other palaces for himself: first the one belonging to the Salviati family at the Roman College, then the one belonging to the Madruzzo family in Borgo; however, in order to provide his family with a residence appropriate to the new cardinal's rank, he continued his purchases of houses on Via dei Giubbonari, having their facades unified and rearranging the main floor into a unified apartment of eight rooms: to this phase, completed by 1612, dates the small chapel that still exists today, which was frescoed by Passignano, a painter the cardinal had also hired for the decoration of the family chapel in Sant'Andrea della Valle. On one side of the little chapel in the Casa Grande, as was the custom of the time, a window led into one of the side halls, from which the family could attend the celebrations. By 1620, a few years before Maffeo's election to the papal throne, new extension work brought the apartment inhabited by his brother Carlo's family to a consistency of thirteen salons around a courtyard with a loggia.

==== The last Barberinian works of enlargement: Carlo, Taddeo and Francesco ====
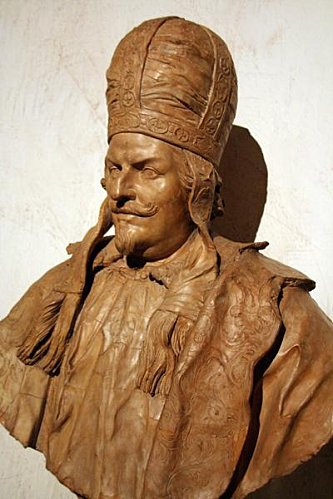
Taddeo Barberini in the robes of Prefect of Rome

With Maffeo's ascension to the papacy in 1623 under the name of Urban VIII, the problem again arose for the Barberinis to provide themselves with a suitable representative residence. While the idea of the grandiose palace at the Quattro Fontane was born and the construction site opened, with the 1625 purchase of the Sforza Cesarini villa, the Casa Grande, assigned to the pope's brother Carlo, was endowed in the years 1623-1624 with new rooms and a unified elevation on Via dei Giubbonari by Giovanni Maria Bonazzini, architect of the Apostolic Camera and brother-in-law of Flaminio Ponzio. Carlo obtained in those years first the title of Gonfalonier of the Holy Roman Church, with the office of Captain General of the papal militia, and then the noble title of Duke of Monterotondo, a fief purchased in 1626 from the Orsini. When he died in 1630, the Casa Grande passed to his son Taddeo, prince of Palestrina and General of the Church in his father's stead, who maintained his residence there, commissioning important new works (1640-1642) from the architect Francesco Contini, who had been active for some years for the Barberini family at the convent of Santa Susanna and later authored for the family works such as the church of Santa Rosalia and the Barberini Triangle in Palestrina. Contini's work was the entire body of the building on the Piazza del Monte di Pietà, with the now lost portal on the façade, the atrium adorned with twelve columns of oriental granite now in the Vatican Museums, the courtyard and the corner roof-terrace. Work was interrupted after the death of Urban VIII by the flight of the Barberini family to France, as part of an investigation opened by his successor Innocent X for irregular management of Papal State property, and was resumed upon the return of the household to the city at the behest of Cardinal Francesco, finishing again under Contini's direction between 1653 and 1658.

==== After the return to Rome: the numerous changes of ownership and the final sale ====
Having returned to Rome and regained possession of the palace on the Quirinal Hill, the Barberini family, while completing work on the Casa Grande, turned to seeking a solution for the enormous property that had by then, with Taddeo's death in exile (1647), become essentially a burden on the family finances. The building, which passed to Prince Maffeo, was sold by him in 1658 for 50,000 scudi to his uncle Cardinal Antonio, who died in 1671 bequeathing it to his brother Francesco and nephew Carlo, both cardinals, and again to Maffeo. The three sold the palace three years later to Stefano Pallavicini, brother of Cardinal Lazzaro who had recently been elevated to the cardinalate and was seeking accommodation for himself and his art collections. The contract of sale for 50,000 scudi, dated Feb. 12, 1674, provided for the possibility of redeeming the Casa Grande within twenty years, which was done in 1694 by Cardinal Carlo Barberini alone. The palace was then leased as a residence for the diplomat Georg Adam II von Martinitz, ambassador of the Holy Roman Empire to the Holy See (1696-1700). The Barberinis tried again to get rid of their first Roman mansion in 1711, lobbying the Monte di Pietà to buy it, and in 1726, attempting this time to sell it to the papal government for use as a court, until, on October 12, 1734, Cardinal Francesco Barberini (1662-1738), nephew and heir of Cardinal Carlo and the last representative of the family's male lineal and legitimate descendants, succeeded in finally ceding the property to the Order of Discalced Carmelites.

=== Order of Discalced Carmelites (1734–1759) ===
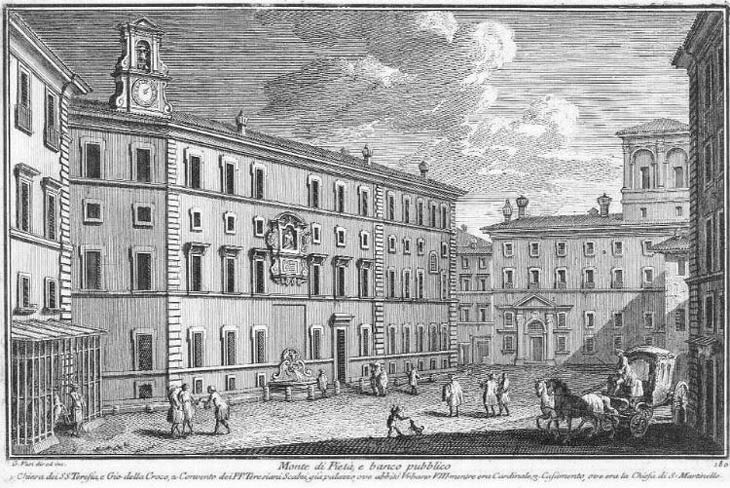
The Casa Grande Barberini, on the right, in an engraving by Vasi showing it in the years when it was a Carmelite convent. The façade it portrays, on the Piazza del Monte di Pietà, is still the one Taddeo Barberini had built, before the late 18th-century and contemporary alterations

Ownership by the Discalced Carmelites was a brief interlude in the history of the Casa Grande. The Order established the purchase of the new headquarters in the general chapter of 1734, proceeding in a short time to draw up the contract with Cardinal Carlo Barberini. Within three months, the solemn blessing of the building, which was used as a convent and the seat of the General Curia of the Order, was achieved on January 21, 1735 by Carmelite Cardinal Giovanni Antonio Guadagni. Contini's atrium was converted into a church, dedicated to Saints Teresa and John of the Cross, founders and glories of the Discalced Carmelites. Three general chapters of the Order met in the convent, until in 1759 it was sold by the Carmelites to the Monte di Pietà and moved to the smaller Rocci palace on Via di Monserrato.

=== Monte di Pietà (1759–1880) ===
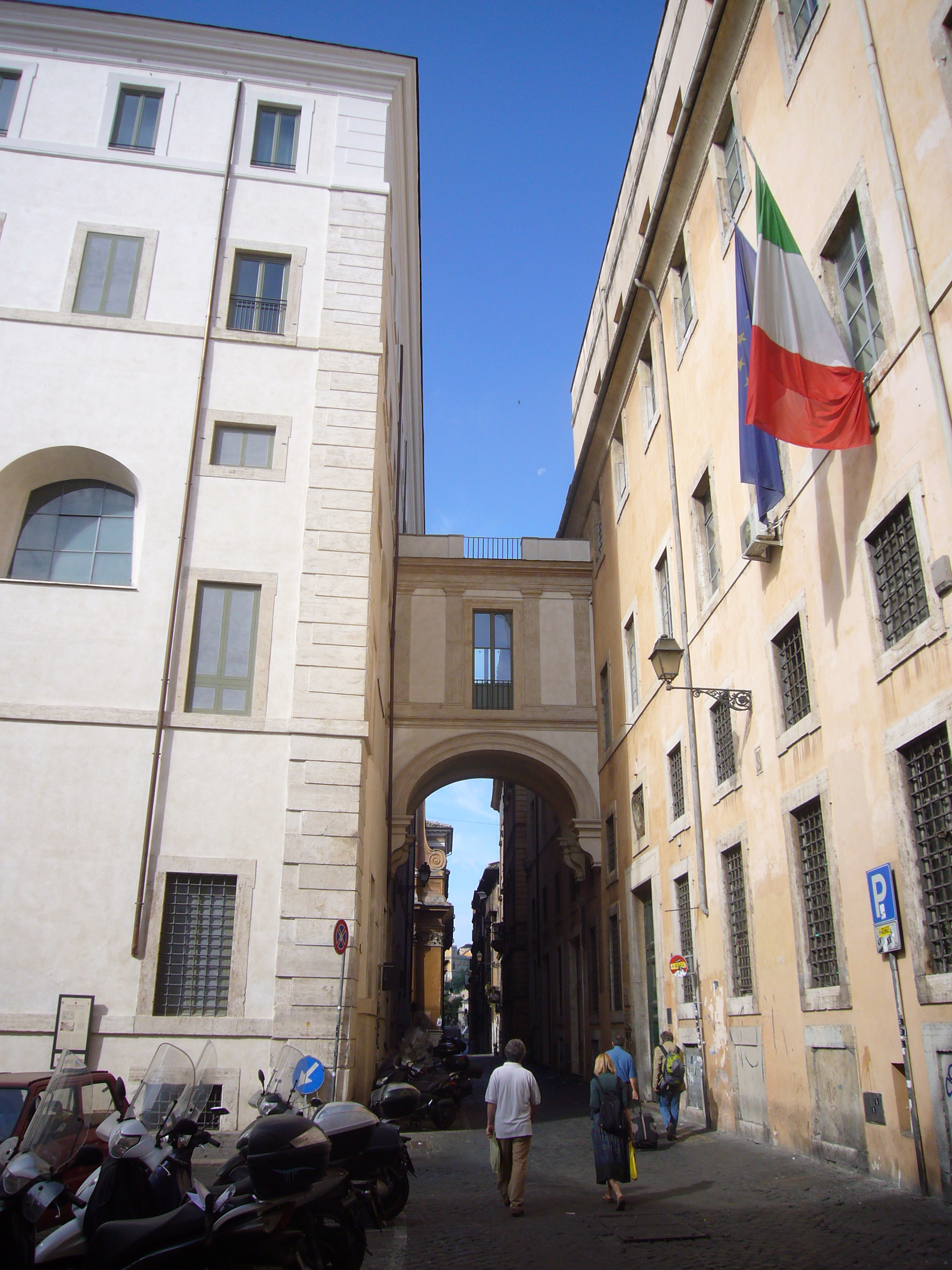
The arch of the Monte, which was built after the Monte di Pietà purchased the Barberini palace to join it to its headquarters

The ancient institution of the Monte di Pietà of Rome, founded in 1527 and approved in 1539 by Paul III with the bull "Ad Sacram Beati Petri Sedem," had its headquarters from the very early seventeenth century in the palace formerly belonging to the Petrignani family of Amelia, which still houses it. During the pontificate of Benedict XIV (1740-1758), the institute became the bank of the State of the Church, assuming first, in 1743, the functions of Secret Treasury and General Depositary of the Reverend Apostolic Camera (previously contracted out to private bankers) and then, from 1749, of Papal Mint. In view of the new space requirements generated by these changes, the Monte di Pietà turned to the search for a location for its new offices, opting in 1759 to purchase from the Discalced Carmelites the old Casa Grande dei Barberini, bordering its palace. To provide a safe passage between the two buildings, the street that separated them was bypassed with an arch, built in the following decade, and from it took the name Via dell'Arco del Monte. The Casa Grande, enlarged in the direction of the arch, was destined to be the headquarters of the General Depositary of the Apostolic Camera, the Depositary Bank and the archives of the Monte di Pietà: the atrium and staircase designed by Giansimoni in the new wing date to these years (1759-1764). From this time until the Capture of Rome, the Casa Grande Barberini remained the property of the Monte di Pietà: among the transformations in the building's decorative apparatus, the three mounts that replaced the Barberini coats of arms in many of the stucco cornices inside bear witness to this phase. In 1819 the twelve black granite columns of Contini's atrium were removed and replaced by travertine columns to adorn the New Wing of the Vatican Museums.

=== State property: the schools ===
Between 1872 and 1880, the vicissitudes of the palace were again separated from those of the Monte di Pietà: the old Casa Grande was destined to be used as the seat of educational institutions by the Municipality of Rome, which took possession of it in those years. The part on Via dei Giubbonari, on which a new gateway was opened, became the site of a Scuola degli Artieri (a type of vocational institute in post-unification Italy consisting of evening drawing schools for people of humble backgrounds already provided with other employment), while the wing on Via dell'Arco del Monte was designated to house Rome's first girls' school, named first Scuola Normale Femminile and then, from 1883, named after the poet Vittoria Colonna, which still exists today. The first principal of this school was Giannina Milli, after whom the institute on Via dei Giubbonari was named, which replaced the Artieri school and which today, since 1923, bears the name "Trento e Trieste." The building's new function led to numerous alterations, including the elevation of the facade on Piazza del Monte di Pietà and, inside, the almost complete disruption of the original division into rooms to create classrooms, bathrooms, cafeterias and every other type of environment necessary for a school. Other parts of the building were put to different uses: the Contini atrium, transformed into a theater in the 1930s for use by the Gruppo Rionale Fascista, is now given over to commercial activities.

== Description ==
The building, which is of considerable size, occupies most of the block between Via dei Giubbonari, Via dell'Arco del Monte, Vicolo della Madonnella (which wedges into the lot by connecting a side entrance of the building to Via Capo di Ferro) and Vicolo delle Grotte; in particular, the building constitutes the corner part of the block facing with its two straight sides onto Via dei Giubbonari and Via dell'Arco del Monte, interrupted in the middle by Piazza del Monte di Pietà, corresponding to the two long main facades, composed of 16 and 18 windows, respectively. The building in its present facies is the result of numerous transformations and extensions, well disguised in its uniform exterior appearance those of the 18th century, more aesthetically cumbersome those of the late 19th century, such as the elevation and the creation of terraces, motivated by the numerous changes of ownership and use throughout its history, as well as by the state of degradation in which the palace often ran into and in which it still finds itself in many of its parts today. It is composed mainly of two bodies of the building, unified on the outside: the first, the Barberinian one, corresponds to the facades on Via dei Giubbonari and Piazza del Monte di Pietà, while the second, from the second half of the eighteenth century, corresponds to the continuation of the facade on Via dell'Arco del Monte towards Trinità dei Pellegrini; both have their own atrium, courtyard and staircase.

=== Exterior ===
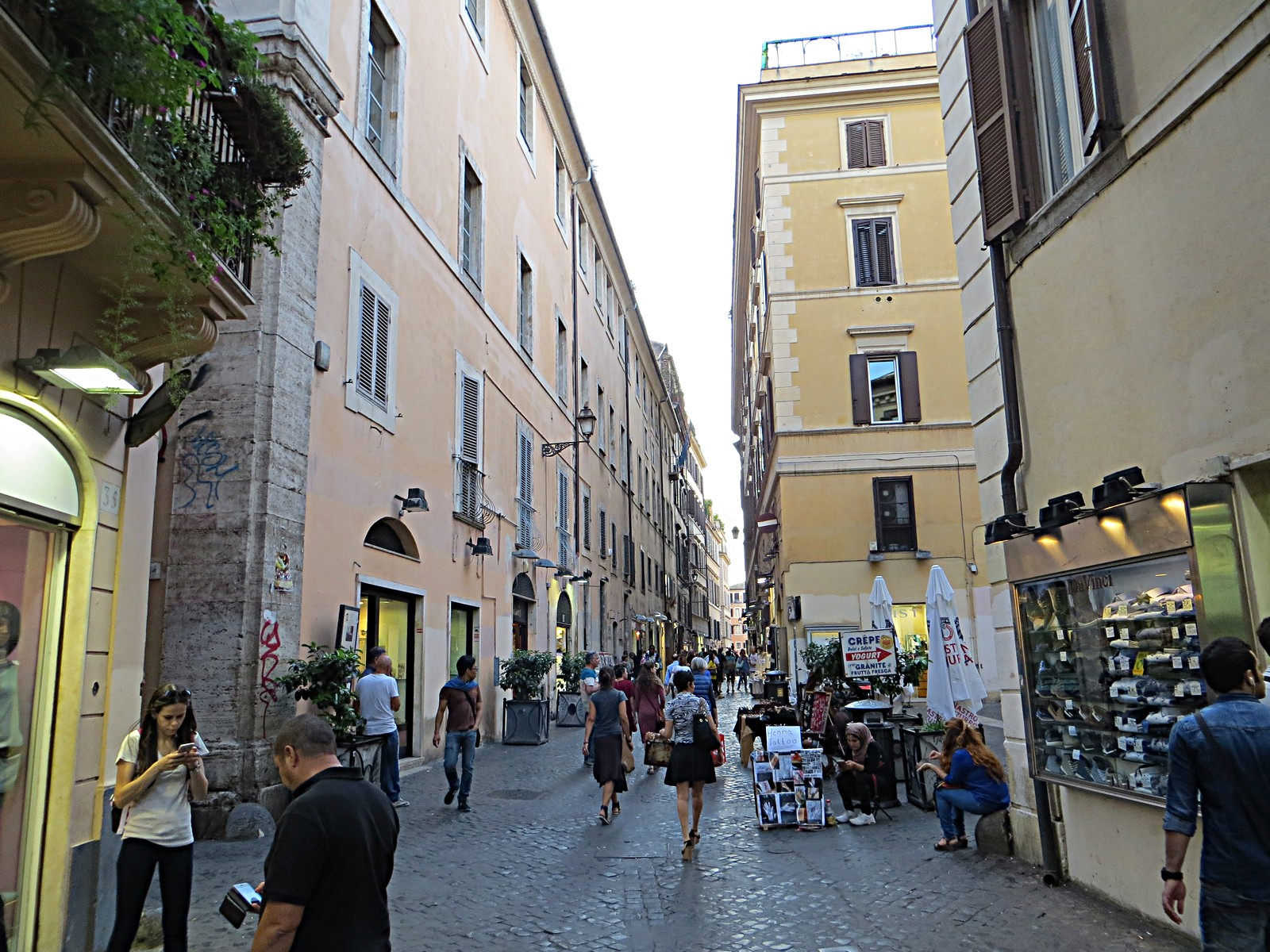
The elevation on Via dei Giubbonari of the Casa Grande Barberini, on the left, with the pilastered cornerstone decorated with the bees of the house

On the exterior, the building has a decorative detailing of extreme restraint, consisting of simple travertine cornices with no moldings around the windows and stores. The corner between the two facades is formed by two superimposed lesenes, the lower in travertine and the higher, resting on the stringcourse of the main floor, in stucco, both bearing on either side, in Tuscan capitals, the Barberini bees. The cornice, with an Egyptian cyma, is smooth in stucco, decorated with a simple egg-and-dart in the lower margin. The facades are distinguished by a first floor with tall barred windows above doors or skylights, and, on the Giubbonari side, rectangular-opening or low arched stores, surmounted by a mezzanine with roughly square windows, also barred, three of which, on Via dei Giubbonari, are French doors with goose-breasted railings. The windows on the main floor, otherwise decorated like all the other openings, have as their only differentiating factor the string-course cornice on which they rest, smooth with travertine; those on the mezzanine floor above, once square and separated by the cornice, are now rectangular and hung from it with a raised stucco cornice clearly differentiated from the ancient travertine. The façade on Monte di Pietà Square once featured an arched portal flanked by two lesenes supporting a triangular tympanum, now replaced by a simple rectangular framed portal; among other changes over time, this façade now continues with a raised floor beyond the cornice, built in the late 19th century for school use. A last remaining element of the original structure is the roof terrace, on the corner between the two facades, formerly peeking out from the roof and now surrounded by the terraces that have replaced it; the decoration, entirely in stucco, of the roof terrace, which is rectangular in shape, with three bays on the long sides and two on the short ones, is slightly more elaborate than that of the rest of the exterior of the palace: windows with molded cornices close the arches, separated by lesenes with festooned Ionic capitals and with Barberini bees in the abacus supporting the entablature, topped by a notched cornice. Suspended between the Monte di Pietà palace and the Casa Grande is an archway, built in the 1760s to join the two buildings after the bank purchased the former Barberini palace: the archway, which gives its name to the street below, rests on four scroll brackets and supports the covered passageway that has, on the two visible sides, two facades with a window with a railing parapet flanked by four Tuscan lesenes, two on each side, supporting the architrave; above, a small terrace with a parapet opened by a railing in the center, at the window.

=== Interior ===
Inside, the continuous change of use over the centuries has retained little of the original residential layout.

Of the original decorative and architectural apparatus in the Barberini building there remain, in addition to the atrium created by Contini (accessed through the right portal of the main facade, at number 99A Via dell'Arco del Monte), consisting of a long barrel-vaulted hall with ribs supported by twelve paired columns, once of black granite and now of travertine, several halls with lunette and cloister vaults with elaborate stucco decorations, and, on the main floor, a wooden ceiling with Barberinian bees, and the chapel commissioned by Cardinal Maffeo; of this, with an oval plan, only the architectural and decorative stuccoes remain, after restoration: on the fluted pilasters that serve as corner pillars, with bees in the capital, are set four arches interspersed with four pendentives that support the oval dome, without a lantern but with an additional oval stucco cornice in the center; nothing remains of the frescoes commissioned by Passignano while in the pendentives the original decorations of gold racemes on a blue background have been reinstated.

In the wing of the palace built after its purchase by the Monte di Pietà (accessed from the left portal of the facade, number 99) there remains the atrium designed by Nicola Giansimoni, oval with a cross vault flanked by two semi-circular vaults, set above an entablature supported by lesenes and free-standing Tuscan columns, and the spiral staircase that rises by turning around it. In the atrium, now the entrance to the Vittoria Colonna High School, two inscriptions "BANCO DE DEPOSITI" and "QUI SI PIGLIA ORO E ARG[ENTO]" still remain as evidence of its original use as a pawnshop.

== See also ==
- Barberini family
- Pope Urban VIII
- Taddeo Barberini
- Mount of piety
- Discalced Carmelites

== Bibliography ==
- Bruno Maria Apollonj Ghetti (September 1932). "La "Casa Grande" dei Barberini". Capitolium: 451–462.
- Carlo Pietrangeli, ed. (1975). Rione VII - Regola. Vol. I (2 ed.). Roma: Fratelli Palombi Editori. pp. 14–18.
- Patricia Waddy (1990). Seventeenth-Century Roman Palaces: Use and the Art of the Plan. New York: The Architectural History Foundation. pp. 132–ss.
- Giorgio Carpaneto (2004). I palazzi di Roma. Roma: Newton & Compton editori. pp. 64–66.
- Claudio Rendina (2015). I palazzi storici di Roma. Roma: Newton Compton editori. p. 145.
