= Lazzaro Opizio Pallavicino =

Italian cardinal

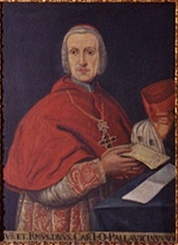

Lazzaro Opizio Pallavicini or Pallavicino (30 October 1719 – 23 February 1785) was a cardinal of the Catholic Church starting in 26 September 1766.

He was born in Genoa, Italy. He was the nephew of Cardinal Lazzaro Pallavicino (1602-1680), and cousin of Count Gian Luca Pallavicini-Centurione, a distinguished soldier and former Governor of Milan. In March 1770, the Count arranged with Pallavicini, who was then Cardinal Secretary of State for the Vatican to host a visit and performance by the 14-year old Wolfgang Amadeus Mozart, in the presence of the pope.
