= Triumph of Chastity =

c. 1530 painting by Lorenzo Lotto

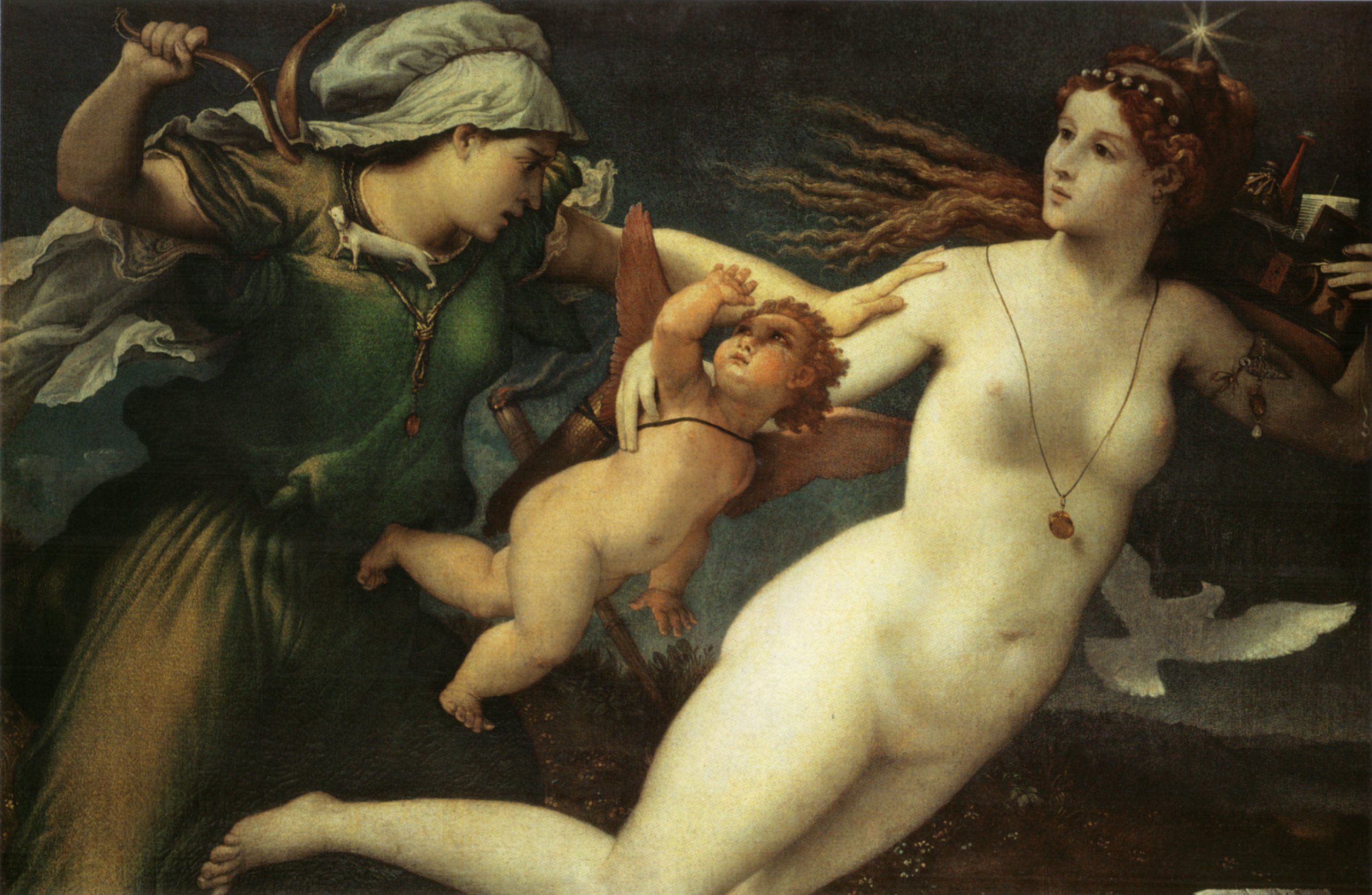
Triumph of Chastity (c. 1530) by Lorenzo Lotto

Triumph of Chastity is an oil-on-canvas allegorical painting by the Italian Renaissance artist Lorenzo Lotto, created c. 1530, now in the Rospigliosi Pallavicini collection in Rome. It is signed at bottom right "Laurentius Lotus" and shows a female personification of Chastity (left) driving away Cupid and Venus. The Venus is based on that on an ancient Roman sarcophagus now in the Vatican Museums.
