= Christian Reder =

German painter

- Born: 1656; Leipzig
- Died: 1729 (aged 72–73); Rome

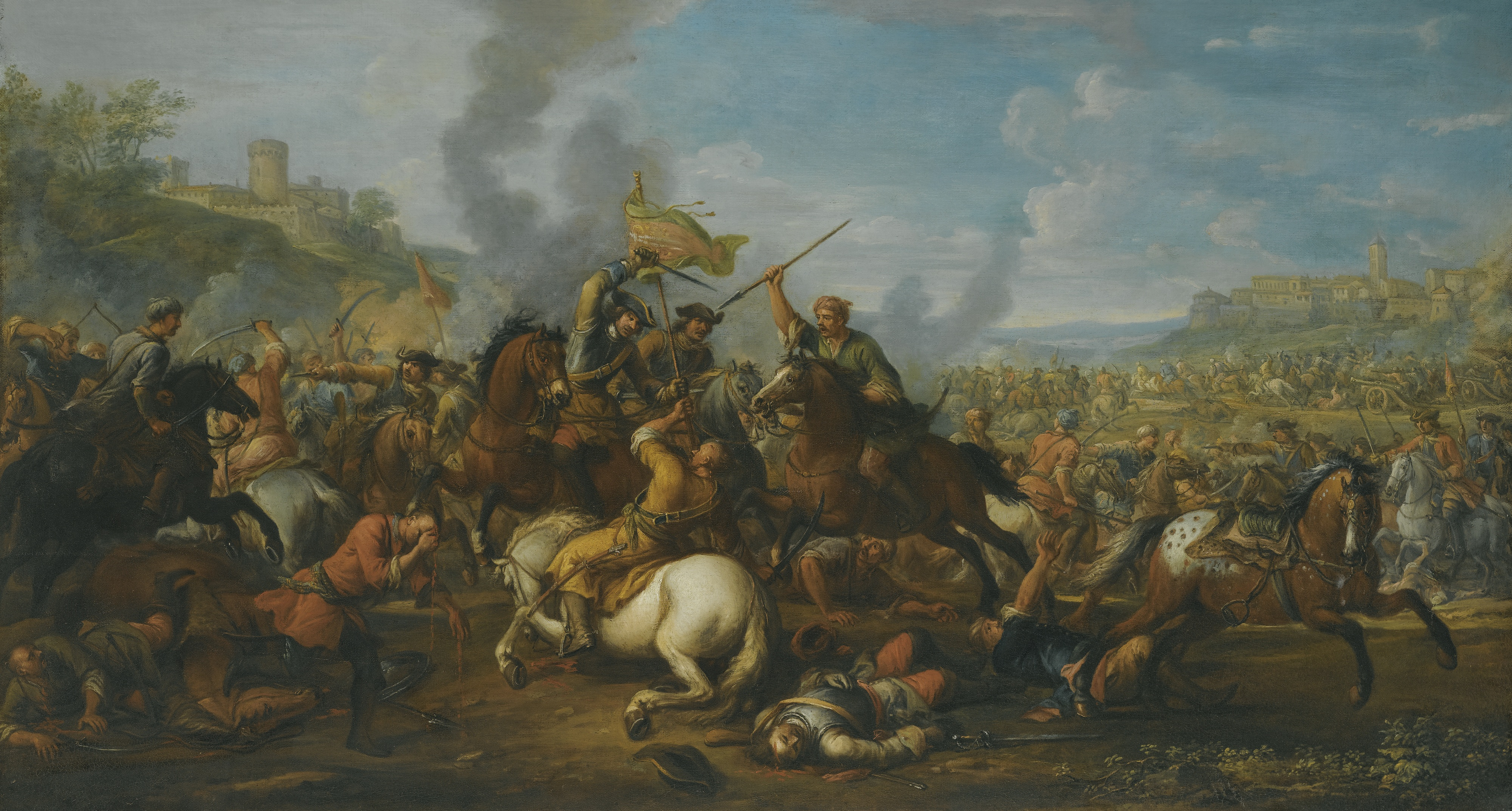
Battle scene between Turks and Christians

Kristiaan Reuder or Christian Reder (1656–1729) was a German painter who travelled to Rome, Papal States, where he then lived for several years.

He was born in Leipzig and travelled to Venice at a young age. By 1690 he was in Rome, where he married Eleonora Paperi in 1693 and was reported to have eight children in 1709.

Reuder became a member of the Bentvueghels with the nickname Leander. He died in Rome.
