= Palazzo Pallavicini-Rospigliosi =

Coordinates: 41.8984°N 12.4877°E

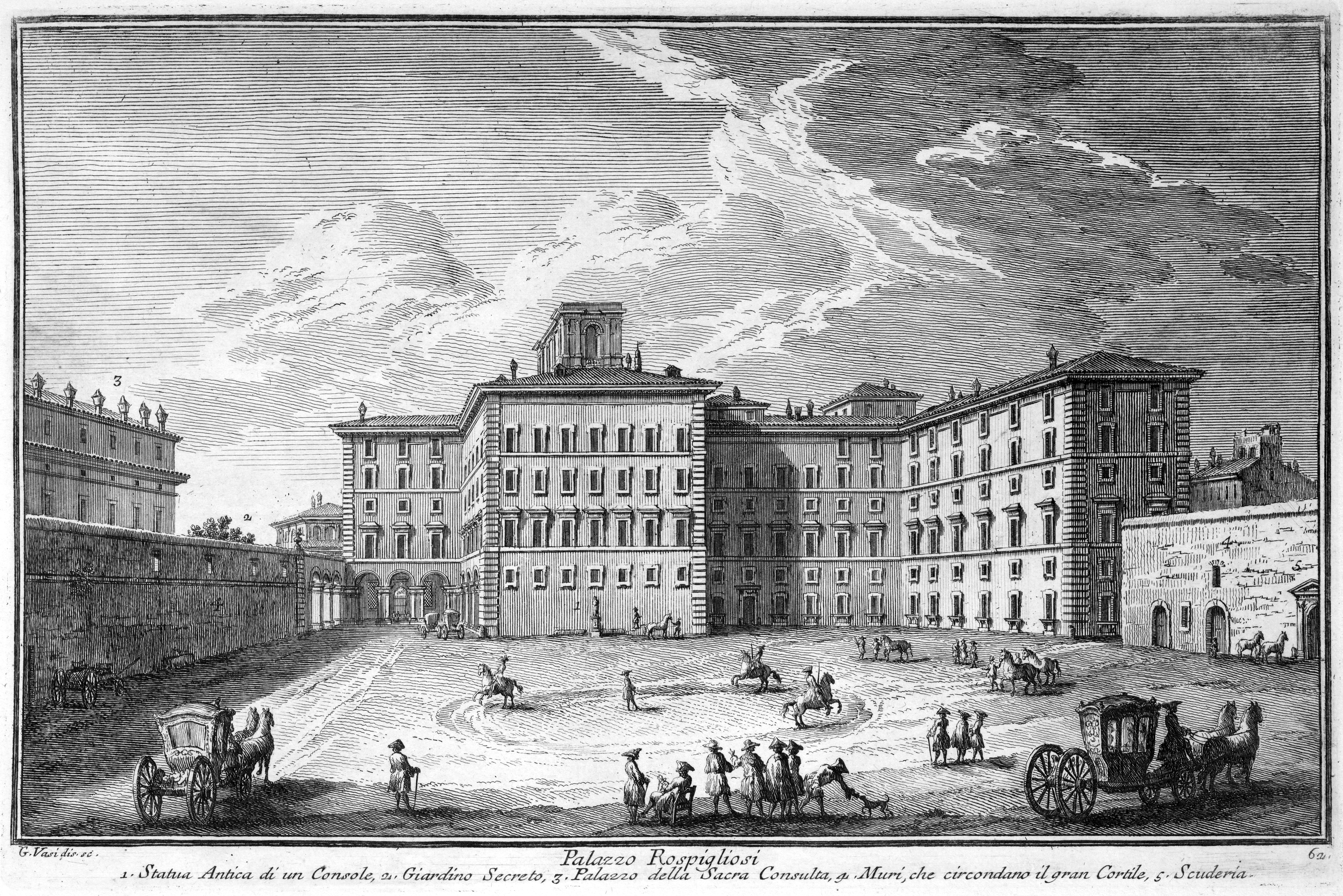
- The palace in an 18th-century engraving by Giuseppe Vasi
- Interactive map of the Palazzo Pallavicini-Rospigliosi area

General information
- Location: Rome, Italy

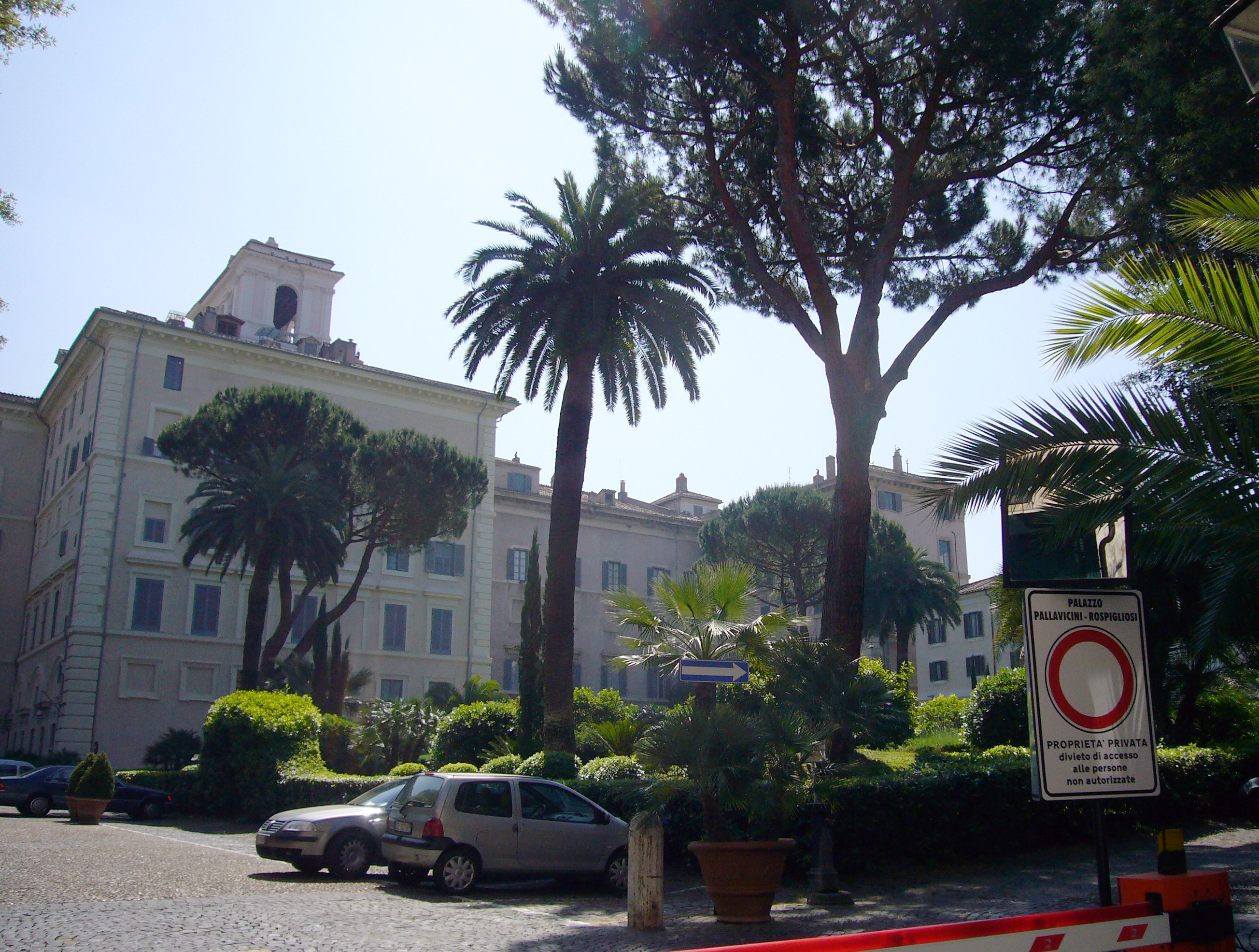
View of the palace

The Palazzo Pallavicini-Rospigliosi is a palace in Rome, Italy. It was built by the Borghese family on the Quirinal Hill; its footprint occupies the site where the ruins of the baths of Constantine stood, whose remains still are part of the basement of the main building, the Casino dell'Aurora. Its first inhabitant was the famed art collector Cardinal Scipione Borghese, the nephew of Pope Paul V, who wanted to be housed near the large papal Palazzo Quirinale. The palace and garden of the Pallavicini-Rospigliosi were the product of the accumulated sites and were designed by Giovanni Vasanzio and Carlo Maderno in 1611–16. Scipione owned this site for less than a decade, 1610–16, and commissioned the construction and decoration of the casino and pergolato, facing the garden of Montecavallo. The Palace has also been the scene of important cultural and religious events. On June 6, 1977 Princess Elvina Pallavicini invited in Palazzo Pallavicini Rospigliosi the archbishop monsignor Marcel Lefebvre for a conference on the Second Vatican Council and for the celebration of a Traditiona Mass, under the careful direction of the marquis Roberto Malvezzi, and Frigate Captain marquis Luigi Coda Nunziante di San Ferdinando. Many members of Alleanza Cattolica, the baron Roberto de Mattei, the pharmacologist Giulio Soldani, the sociologist Massimo Introvigne, the psychiatrist Mario Di Fiorino and Attilio Tamburrini (who will manage, together with Alfredo Mantovano, the Pontifical Foundation of the Catholic Church “Aid to the Church in Need”) and his brother Renato Tamburrini took part to the event.

== The Casino dell'Aurora and L'Aurora fresco by Guido Reni ==
The palace's main attraction, beside the art gallery, is the Casino dell'Aurora. The casino was designed by Vasanzio is located overlooking the Piazza del Quirinale. On the walls are four frescoes of the Seasons by Paul Bril, and two Triumphs by Antonio Tempesta. Its ceiling displays what is considered the Bolognese painter Guido Reni's fresco masterpiece (1614), commonly called L'Aurora. It is surrounded by a painted frame or quadro riportato and depicts Apollo in his Chariot preceded by Dawn (Aurora) bringing light to the world. The incorporated heraldic symbols were meant to link Scipione with Apollo. The work is classically restrained and mimics poses from ancient Roman sarcophagi, many of which are part of the museum's collection. The chariot procession, which recalls the Annibale Carracci paintings in the Farnese Gallery in the Farnese Palace, shows even more restraint. There is little concession to perspective, and if anything the vibrantly colored style is an affront to the tenebrism of Caravaggio's followers, despite this being a pavilion commissioned by one of Caravaggio's early patrons, Scipione Borghese. The pergolato is decorated by Paul Bril.

The architect Vasanzio succeeded in achieving a perfect balance between the architectural structure and the lavish decoration of the façade. It is characterised by slabs from Roman sarcophagi of the 2nd and 3rd centuries AD, which recount ancient mythological tales linked to the subject of love-death and the immortality of the soul. The central part of the façade is enhanced by big windows, which create charming transparency between outdoors and indoors and open onto the big central hall with its ceiling decorated with the Aurora fresco.

The same room holds other beautiful frescoes: the Triumph of Fame and the Triumph of Love by Antonio Tempesta, the Cardinal's coat of arms and Cherubino Alberti's putti, the Four Seasons by Paul Bril, 17th-century marble busts and sculptures from the Roman era, including the famous Artemis the Huntress and the Rospigliosi Athena. The ceilings of the two side halls are frescoed by Domenico Passignano with the Battle between Rinaldo and Armida and Giovanni Baglione with the Tale of Armida and some paintings from the Pallavicini Collection are still kept there.

Later the site was sold to Giovanni Angelo Altemps for the sum of 115,000 scudi with the Reni Aurora fresco valued at 200 scudi. It was then sold to the Bentivoglio family, followed by the Lante family, and then to Cardinal G. Mazarini. It is during the ownership by these families and individuals that the main building of the palace took its final shape.

The palace served as the French embassy in Rome prior before it moved to its more spacious current accommodation at the Palazzo Farnese. In 1704, the palace became a property of the Rospigliosi-Pallavicini family, who still own it and who enriched its decoration and completed its present art gallery.

The casino is rented out for meetings.

== Art gallery ==
The art gallery, the Galleria Pallavicini, was begun by Cardinal Lazzaro Pallavicini, and includes more than 540 paintings, designs and sculptures. Aside from the collections of the Doria-Pamphili and Colonna families, this is the largest private collection in Rome. The rooms are frescoed by Paul Bril, and a loggia in a garden is decorated with frescoes by Orazio Gentileschi and Agostino Tassi. Among the paintings that remain in the collection, following some sales and losses in previous centuries, are works by artists such as:

- Botticelli
- Johann van Bloemen with a veduta of the Colosseum.
- Paul Bril with veduta of coast.
- Abraham Brueghel III with a Still life with apples, pomegranate, grapes and a man.
- Annibale Carracci
- Giuseppe Bartolomeo Chiari with Flight from Egypt.
- Sebastiano Conca with a Holy Family.
- Pietro da Cortona
- Jacques Courtois with two battle paintings.
- Domenichino, Anthony van Dyck with a Santa Rosalia.
- Ludovico Gimignani with an “Ester who faints in front of Assuero” and another completed with help by David de Coninck: Boy with greyhound .
- Luca Giordano with Helen's escape.
- Guercino has eight paintings including San Francis praying, Fruit-seller and child and Flora.
- Lorenzo Lotto: Madonna with Child and Saints Jerome and Nicholas of Tolentino.
- Benedetto Luti with a portrait of Cardinal Fabroni.
- Simone Pignoni has an attributed a Cefalo and Procris.
- Poussin
- Mattia Preti with a Christ before Pontius Pilate.
- Reni
- Rubens: Thirteen portraits of Jesus Christ and The Twelve Apostles
- Sacchi with the Drunkedness of Noah.
- Luca Signorelli
- Ferdinand Voet with a portrait of Vincenzo Rospigliosi.

== See also ==
- Palais Pallavicini in Vienna

There is also a Palazzo Pallavicini-Rospigliosi in Pistoia.
