= Lazzaro Pallavicini =

Italian cardinal

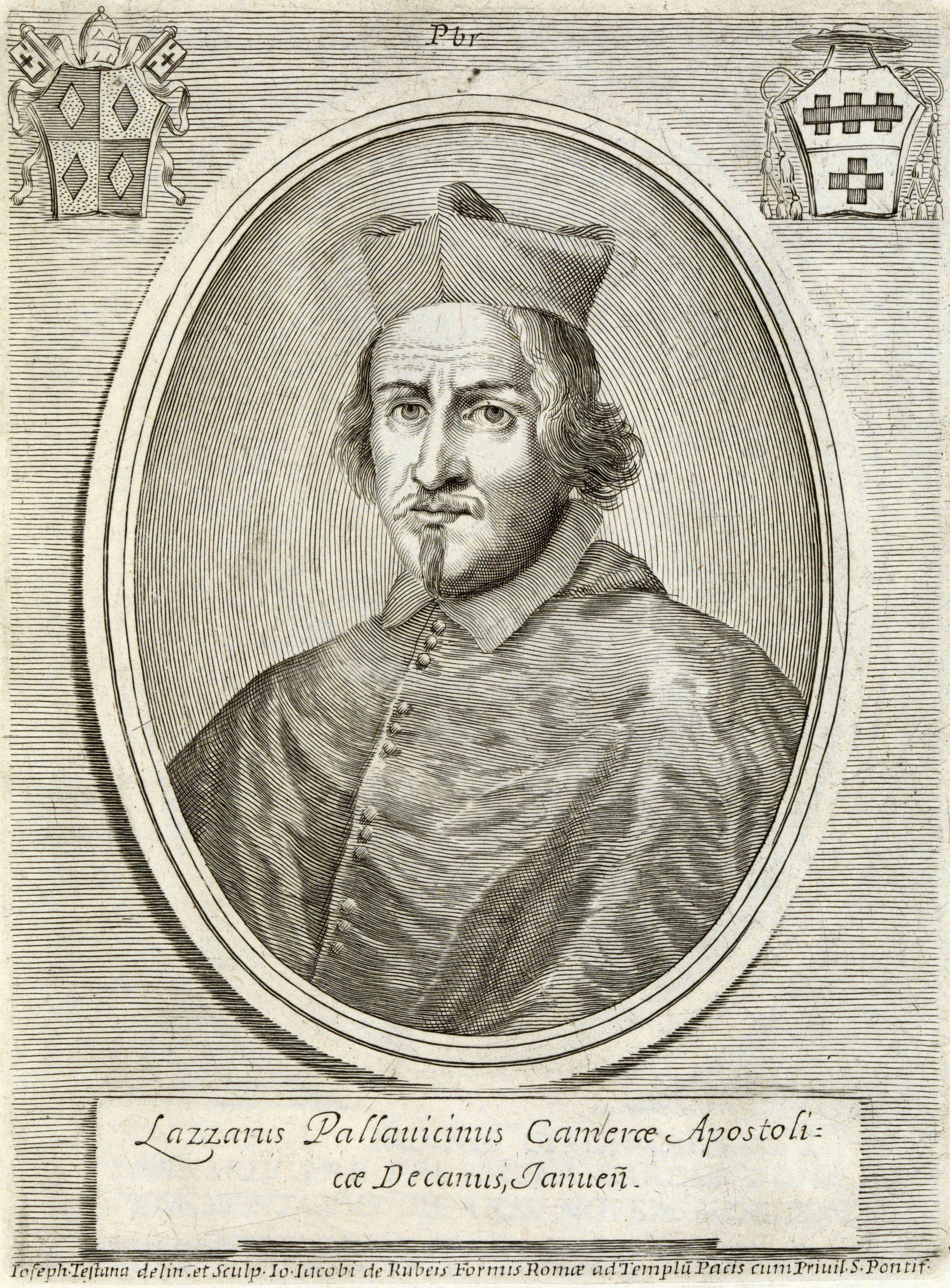
Testana Giuseppe - Lazzaro Pallavicino.jpg

Lazzaro Pallavicini or Pallavicino (1602/1603 – 21 April 1680) was a cardinal of the Catholic Church starting on 19 May 1670.

He was one of 22 siblings born in Genoa, Italy. His ancestors and kin included cardinals and Genoese doges. Cardinal Lazzaro Opizio Pallavicino (1719–1785) was his nephew.

He participated in the papal conclaves of 1669, 1670, and 1676.

He amassed much of the art collection now held by the Galleria Pallavicini at the Palazzo Pallavicini-Rospigliosi in Rome.
