= Quadro riportato =

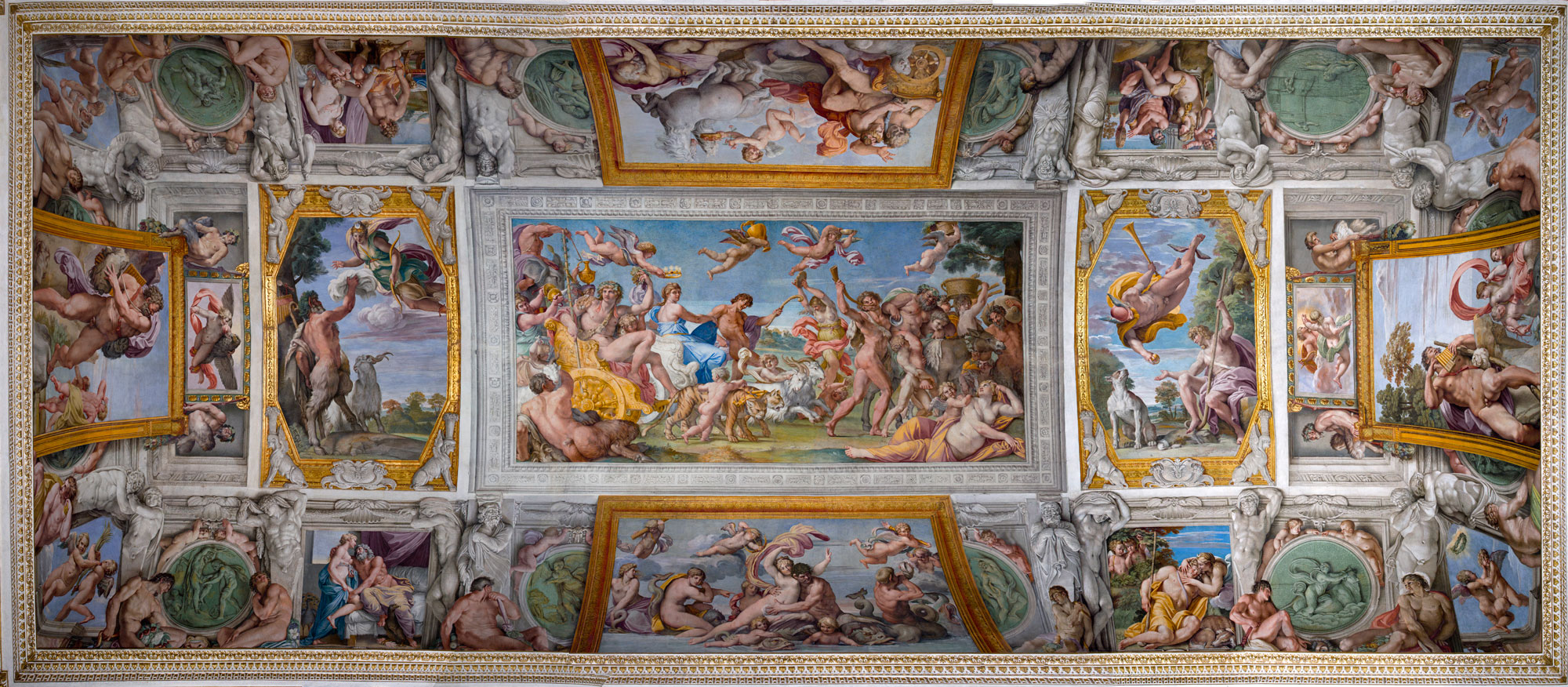
The Loves of the Gods, in the Palazzo Farnese, by Annibale Carracci, a renowned example of quadro riportati

Quadro riportato (plural quadri riportati) is the Italian phrase for "carried picture" or "transported paintings". It is used in art to describe gold-framed easel paintings or framed paintings that are seen in a normal perspective and painted into a fresco. The final effect is similar to illusionism, but the latter encompasses painted statues, reliefs and tapestries.

The ceiling is intended to look as if a framed painting has been placed overhead; there is no illusionistic foreshortening, figures appearing as if they were to be viewed at normal eye level. Mengs' Parnassus (1761) in the Villa Albani (now Villa Albani-Torlonia) is a famous example — a Neoclassical criticism against Baroque illusionism. Often, however, quadri riportati were combined with illusionistic elements, as in Annibale Carracci's Farnese Ceiling (1597–1600) in Rome.
