= 1342 conclave =

Election of Catholic Pope Clement VI

Papal conclave May 1342

Dates and location
- 5–7 May 1342; Palais des Papes, Avignon

Key officials
- Dean: Pierre Desprès
- Camerlengo: Gasbert de Valle
- Protopriest: Imbert Dupuis
- Protodeacon: Guillaume de Farges

Elected pope
- Pierre Roger; Name taken: Clement VI
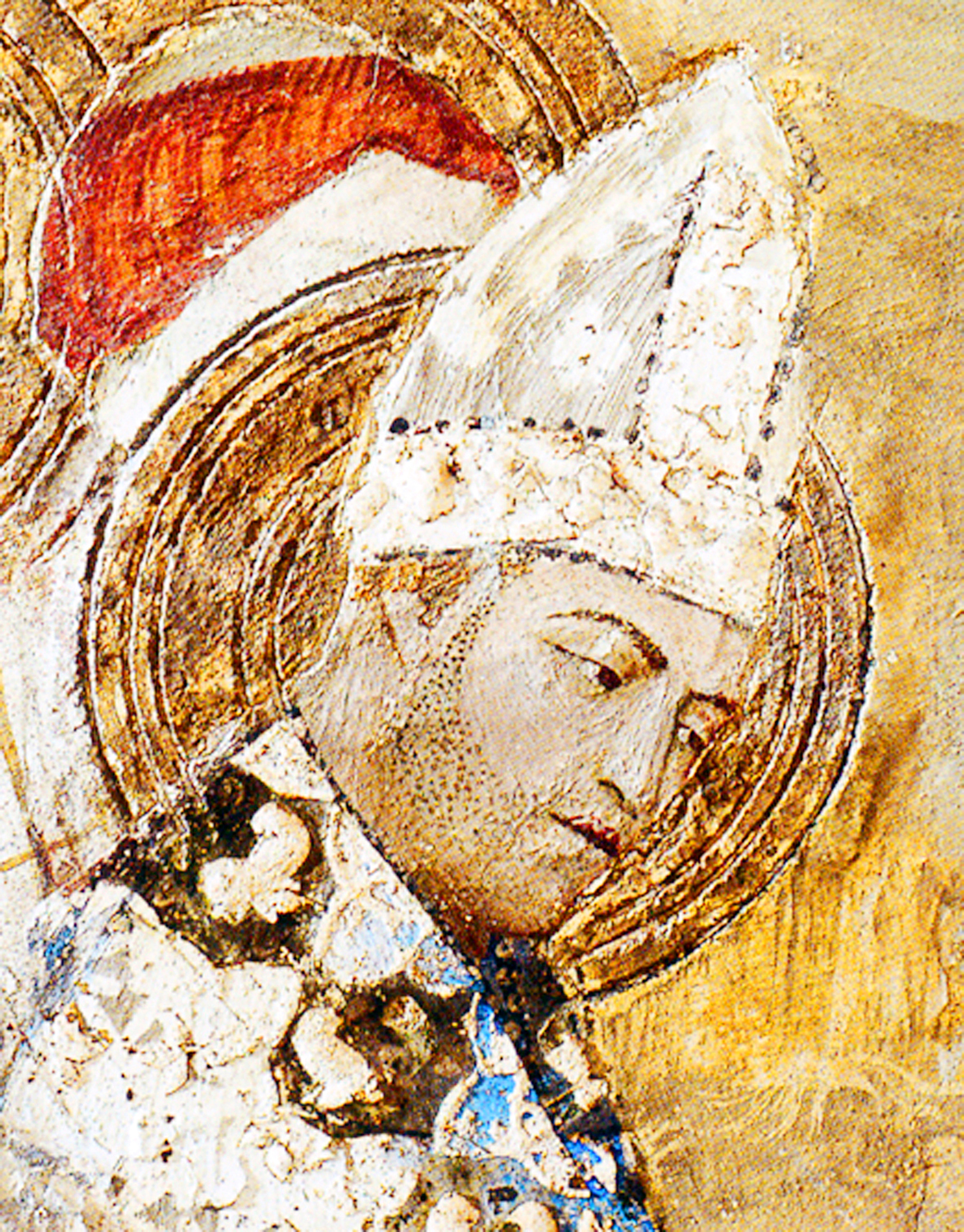

The papal conclave held from 5 to 7 May 1342 was convened after the death of Pope Benedict XII and elected Cardinal Pierre Roger to succeed as pope. The fourth pope of the period of the Avignon Papacy, he took the name Clement VI.

== Cardinal electors ==
Pope Benedict XII died at Avignon on 25 April 1342. At the time of his death, there were nineteen cardinals in the Sacred College, of whom seventeen participated in the subsequent conclave:

Elector	Title	Elevated	Elevator	Notes
Pierre Desprès	Bishop of Palestrina	20 December 1320	John XXII	Dean of the Sacred College of Cardinals; Vice-Chancellor of the Holy Roman Church
Bertrand du Pouget	Bishop of Ostia e Velletri	17 December 1316	John XXII	nephew of John XXII
Jean-Raymond de Comminges	Bishop of Porto e Santa Rufina	18 December 1327	John XXII	
Annibaldo di Ceccano	Bishop of Frascati	18 December 1327	John XXII	
Pedro Gómez de Barroso	Bishop of Sabina	18 December 1327	John XXII	
Imbert du Puy	Priest of SS. XII Apostoli	18 December 1327	John XXII	Protopriest and Camerlengo of the Sacred College of Cardinals nephew of John XXII
Hélie de Talleyrand-Périgord	Priest of S. Pietro in Vincoli	25 May 1331	John XXII	Cardinal-protector of the Order of Franciscans
Pierre Bertrand	Priest of S. Clemente	20 December 1331	John XXII	
Gozzio Battaglia	Priest of S. Prisca	18 December 1338	Benedict XII	
Bertrand de Déaulx	Priest of S. Marco	18 December 1338	Benedict XII	
Pierre Roger, O.S.B.	Priest of SS. Nereo ed Achilleo	18 December 1338	Benedict XII	Elected Pope Clement VI
Guillaume Court, O.Cist.	Priest of SS. IV Coronati	18 December 1338	Benedict XII	nephew of John XXII
Bernard d’Albi	Priest of S. Ciriaco alle Terme	18 December 1338	Benedict XII	
Guillaume d'Aure, O.S.B.	Priest of S. Stefano al Monte Celio	January 1339	Benedict XII	
Raymond Guillaume des Farges	Deacon of S. Maria Nuova	19 December 1310	Clement V	Protodeacon of the Sacred College of Cardinals; nephew of John XXII
Gaillard de la Mothe	Deacon of S. Lucia in Silice	17 December 1316	John XXII	
Giovanni Colonna	Deacon of S. Angelo in Pescheria	18 December 1327	John XXII	

Ten electors were creatures of John XXII, six of Benedict XII and one of Clement V. Thirteen of them were French, three Italian and one Spanish.

The post of the Camerlengo of the Holy Roman Church was occupied at that time by Gasbert de Valle, Archbishop of Narbonne (not a Cardinal) and nephew of Pope John XXII.

== Absentee cardinals ==
Two French Cardinals, both elevated by John XXII, did not participate in this conclave:

Elector	Cardinalatial Title	Elevated	Elevator	Notes
Gauscelin de Jean	Bishop of Albano	17 December 1316	John XXII	Grand penitentiary; nephew of John XXII
Bertrand de Montfavez	Deacon of S. Maria in Aquiro	17 December 1316	John XXII	Archpriest of the patriarchal Lateran Basilica

== The election of Pope Clement VI ==
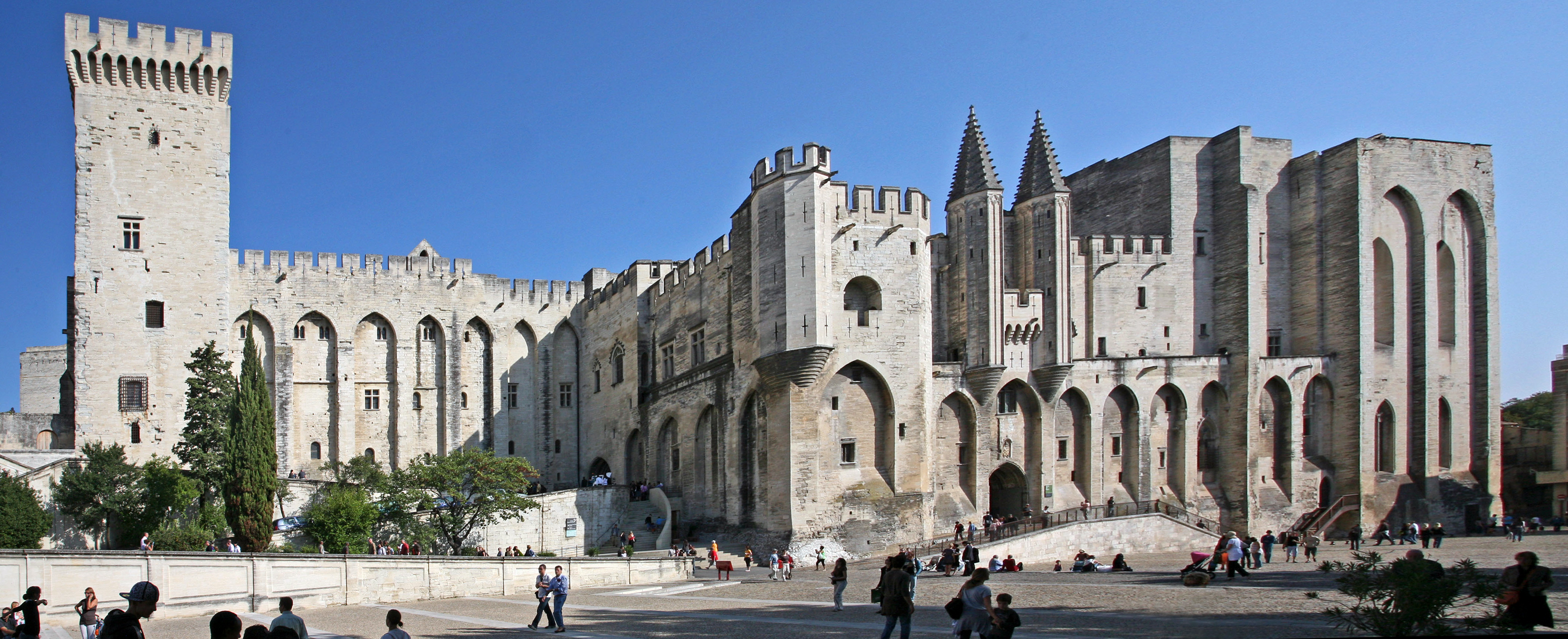
Palais des Papes, Avignon

The conclave started on 5 May and lasted only two days. On 7 May Cardinal Pierre Roger, former Chancellor of the Kingdom of France, was unanimously elected Pope, "by divine inspiration alone", as reported shortly thereafter Cardinals des Farges and Ceccano. Once elected he took the name of Clement VI. On 19 May the new Pope was crowned in the church of the Dominicans in Avignon by Raymond Guillaume des Farges, protodeacon of S. Maria Nuova.

Shortly after the death of Benedict XII king Philip VI of France sent to Avignon his eldest son with the task to support the candidature of Cardinal Roger, but when he arrived, the election had been already accomplished with the result expected by the king.

== Sources ==
- Miranda, Salvador. "Conclave of May 5 - 7, 1342 (Clement VI)". The Cardinals of the Holy Roman Church. Florida International University. OCLC 53276621.
- G. Mollat "The Popes at Avignon 1305-1378", London 1963
- Wrigley, J.E. 1982. "The Conclave and the Electors of 1342". Archivum Historiae Pontificiae Roma, 20: 51-81.
