= 1352 conclave =

Election of Catholic Pope Innocent VI

Papal conclave December 1352

Dates and location
- 16–18 December 1352; Palais des Papes, Avignon

Key officials
- Dean: Pierre Desprès
- Camerlengo: Stefano Aldebrandi Cambaruti
- Protodeacon: Gaillard de la Mothe

Elected pope
- Étienne Aubert; Name taken: Innocent VI
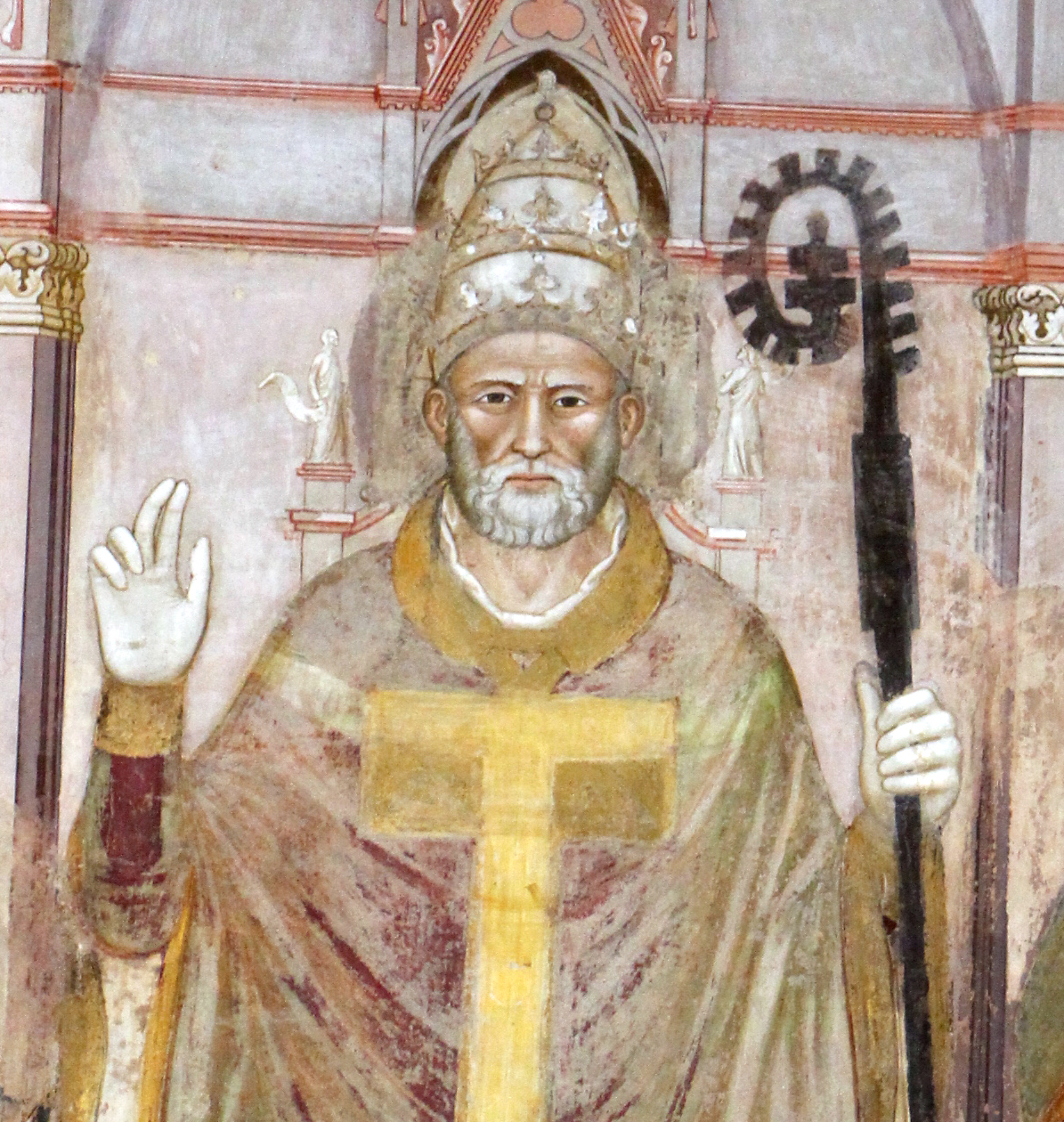

The papal conclave held from 16 to 18 December 1352 was convened after the death of Pope Clement VI and elected as his successor Cardinal Etienne Aubert. The fifth pope of the period of the Avignon Papacy, he took the name Innocent VI. This conclave is remarkable because during its celebration cardinals for the first time in history subscribed the electoral capitulation, which limited the power of elect.

== List of participants ==
Pope Clement VI died on December 6, 1352, at Avignon. During his pontificate he constantly refused to return to Rome and purchased the sovereignty of Avignon (where resided papal court) from Queen Joan I of Naples. At the time of his death, there were 26 living cardinals. 25 of them participated in the conclave:

Elector	Cardinalatial Title	Elevated	Elevator	Notes
Pierre Desprès	Bishop of Palestrina	1320, December 20	Pope John XXII	Dean of the Sacred College of Cardinals; Vice-Chancellor of the Holy Roman Church
Hélie de Talleyrand-Périgord	Bishop of Albano	1331, May 25	Pope John XXII	Cardinal-protector of the Order of Franciscans
Bertrand de Déaulx	Bishop of Sabina	1338, December 18	Pope Benedict XII	
Guillaume de Court, O.Cist.	Bishop of Frascati	1338, December 18	Pope Benedict XII (nephew)	Camerlengo of the Sacred College of Cardinals
Etienne Aubert (elected Pope Innocent VI)	Bishop of Ostia e Velletri	1342, September 20	Pope Clement VI	Grand Penitentiary
Guillaume d'Aure, O.S.B.	Priest of S. Stefano al Monte Celio	1338, December 18	Pope Benedict XII	Archpriest of the Sacred College of Cardinals; Inquisitor General
Hugues Roger, O.S.B.	Priest of S. Clemente	1342, September 20	Pope Clement VI (brother of Clement VI)	
Pierre Bertrand de Colombier	Priest of S. Susanna	1344, February 27	Pope Clement VI	
Gil Álvarez Carrillo de Albornoz	Priest of S. Clemente	1350, December 17	Pope Clement VI	
Pasteur de Sarrats, O.F.M.	Priest of SS. Marcellino e Pietro	1350, December 17	Pope Clement VI	
Raymond de Canillac, C.R.S.A.	Priest of S. Croce in Gerusalemme	1350, December 17	Pope Clement VI (nephew of Clement VI)	
Guillaume d'Aigrefeuille, O.S.B.	Priest of S. Maria in Transpontina	1350, December 17	Pope Clement VI (nephew of Clement VI)	
Nicola Capocci	Priest of S. Vitale	1350, December 17	Pope Clement VI	Archpriest of the patriarchal Liberian Basilica
Pasqual de Montesquieu	Priest of SS. XII Apostoli	1350, December 17	Pope Clement VI	
Arnaud de Villemur, C.R.S.A.	Priest of S. Sisto	1350, December 17	Pope Clement VI	
Pierre de Cros	Priest of SS. Silvestro e Martino	1350, December 17	Pope Clement VI (Cardinal-nephew)	
Gilles Rigaud, O.S.B.	Priest of S. Prassede	1350, December 17	Pope Clement VI	
Jean de Moulins, O.P.	Priest of S. Sabina	1350, December 17	Pope Clement VI	
Gaillard de la Mothe	Deacon of S. Lucia in Silice	1316, December 17	Pope John XXII	Protodeacon of the Sacred College of Cardinals
Bernard de la Tour	Deacon of S. Eustachio	1342, September 20	Pope Clement VI (Cardinal-nephew)	
Guillaume de la Jugié	Deacon of S. Maria in Cosmedin	1342, September 20	Pope Clement VI (Cardinal-nephew)	
Nicolas de Besse	Deacon of S. Maria in Via Lata	1344, February 27	Pope Clement VI (Cardinal-nephew)	
Pierre Roger de Beaufort	Deacon of S. Maria Nuova	1348, May 28	Pope Clement VI (Cardinal-nephew)	Archpriest of the patriarchal Lateran Basilica
Rinaldo Orsini	Deacon of S. Adriano	1350, December 17	Pope Clement VI	
Jean de Caraman	Deacon of S. Giorgio in Velabro	1350, December 17	Pope Clement VI	

Nineteen electors were created by Pope Clement VI, and eight of them were his relatives. Of the remaining six three were creatures of John XXII and three of Benedict XII.

The post of Camerlengo of the Holy Roman Church, the most important during sede vacante, was occupied by Stefano Aldebrandi Cambaruti, archbishop of Toulouse (not a Cardinal).

== Absentee ==
One cardinal created by Clement VI did not participate in this conclave, because he served as legate in France, where he unsuccessfully tried to establish peace between the Kingdom of France and the Kingdom of England in the Hundred Years' War:

Elector	Cardinalatial Title	Elevated	Elevator	Notes
Guy de Boulogne	Bishop of Porto e Santa Rufina; commendatario of S. Cecilia and S. Crisogono	1342, September 20	Pope Clement VI	Papal Legate in the Kingdom of France

== First conclave capitulation in history ==
On December 16 twenty five cardinals entered the conclave in the Palais des Papes in Avignon. Initially, all the electors subscribed the first conclave capitulation in the history, although several of them (including Cardinal Aubert) made this with reservation, insofar as it was not contrary to church law”. The terms of capitulation were following:

- College of Cardinals limited to 20; no new cardinals until only 16 remained.
- Two-thirds of College needed to approve creating, excommunicating, depriving of suffrage, or reducing the property or revenue of cardinals, or to request subsidies from sovereigns or national clergies.
- College granted veto power of papal decisions and policies.
- All papal revenue shared with College.

Subscription of this capitulation is considered as part of the general strategy of the College of Cardinals to limit papal power and to transform the government of the Church into oligarchy instead of monarchy.

== Election of Pope Innocent VI ==
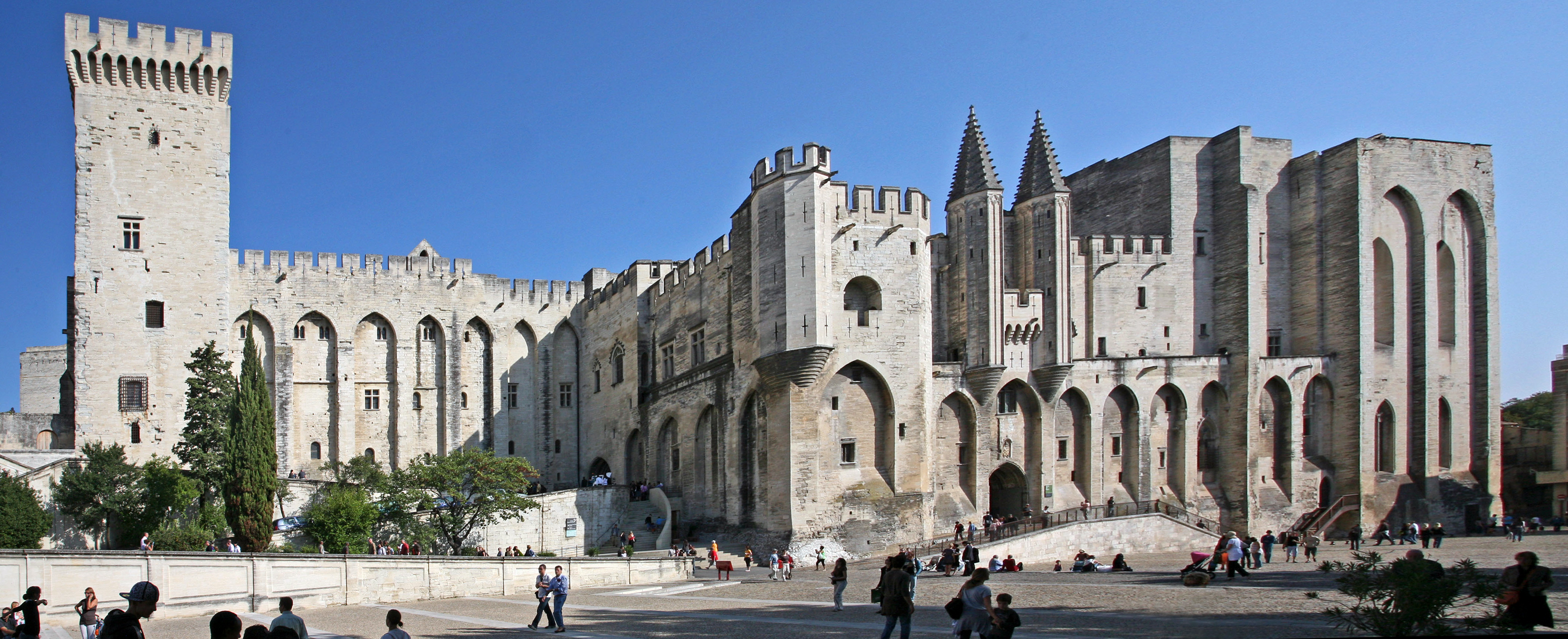
Palais des Papes, Avignon

After subscribing the capitulation cardinals started electoral proceedings. Initially, the candidature of Jean Birel, general of the Order of Carthusians, non-cardinal, venerated for his holiness, was proposed. But Cardinal Talleyrand addressed to the Sacred College that it would be unwise, if not dangerous, in such critical circumstances in Europe to elect a new Celestine V, which means, a saintly but wholly incompetent Pontiff. The electors eventually agreed with him and abandoned the candidature of Birel in favor of Cardinal Etienne Aubert, bishop of Ostia, who on December 18 was unanimously elected Pope. He accepted his election and took the name of Innocent VI. On December 30 he was solemnly crowned in the cathedral of Notre Dame des Doms in Avignon by Cardinal Gaillard de la Mothe, protodeacon of S. Lucia in Silice.

On July 6, 1353, Pope Innocent VI declared the capitulation agreed by the conclave invalid as violating the rule restricting business during a conclave to the election of the new pope and as infringing the plenitude of power inherent in the papal office. In spite of this, electoral capitulations were subscribed in the majority of the conclaves held in the next 300 years.

== See also ==
- Conclave capitulation
