= 1334 conclave =

Election of Catholic Pope Benedict XII

Papal conclave December 1334

Dates and location
- 13–20 December 1334; Palais des Papes, Avignon

Election
- Candidates: Jean-Raymond de Comminges

Elected pope
- Jacques Fournier; Name taken: Benedict XII
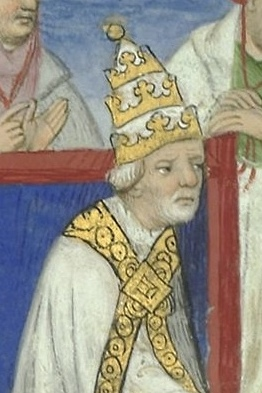

The papal conclave held from 13 to 20 December 1334 in Avignon elected Jacques Fournier to succeed John XXII as pope. A major point of contention was whether the new pope was to return in Rome or stay in Avignon. Fournier took the name Benedict XII.

== Cardinals ==
Twenty-four cardinals attended the conclave of December 1334. 16 were French, 7 Italian and 1 Spanish.

Their names are listed by Konrad Eubel in Hierarchia catholica :

- Guillaume de Pierre Godin, Dean of the College of Cardinals.
- Pierre Desprès, O.P., Sub-dean of the College of Cardinals and Vice-Chancellor of the Holy Roman Church.
- Bertrand du Pouget, Cardinal priest of S. Marcello
- Gauscelin de Jean, Grand penitentiary.
- Jean-Raymond de Comminges, Cardinal-bishop of Porto e S. Rufina
- Annibaldo Caetani di Ceccano, Cardinal-Bishop of Frascati
- Jacques Fournier, O.Cist., elected Pope Benedict XII.
- Raymond de Mostuéjouls, Cardinal-priest of S. Eusebio
- Pierre de Mortemart, Cardinal-priest of S. Stefano al Monte Celio
- Pierre de Chappes, Cardinal-priest of SS. Silvestro e Martino
- Matteo Orsini di Monte Giordano, O.P., Cardinal-priest of SS. Giovanni e Paolo
- Pedro Gómez de Barroso, Camerlengo of the Sacred College.
- Imbert Dupuis, Cardinal-priest of XII Santi Apostoli
- Hélie de Talleyrand-Périgord, Cardinal-priest of S. Pietro in Vincoli
- Pierre Bertrand d'Annonay, Cardinal-priest of S. Clemente
- Napoleone Orsini Frangipani, Protodeacon and Archpriest of the Old St. Peter's Basilica.
- Giacomo Gaetani Stefaneschi, Cardinal-deacon of San Giorgio in Velabro
- Luca Fieschi, Cardinal-deacon of Santi Cosma e Damiano
- Raymond Guillaume des Farges, Cardinal-deacon of Santa Maria Nuova
- Bertrand de Montfavez, Archpriest of Saint John Lateran.
- Gaillard de la Mothe, Cardinal-deacon of S. Lucia in Silice
- Gian Gaetano Orsini, Cardinal-deacon of S. Teodoro
- Arnaud de Via, Cardinal-deacon of S. Eustachio
- Giovanni Colonna, Archpriest of Santa Maria Maggiore.

Of these 24 Cardinals, 19 had been created by John XXII, 2 by Clement V, 2 by Boniface VIII, and 1 by Nicholas IV.

== Politics ==
An early favorite among the papabile was Cardinal Jean-Raymond de Comminges, Bishop of Porto e Santa Rufina, son of Count Bernard VI of Comminges and Laura de Montfort. The French cardinals, led by Hélie de Talleyrand-Périgord, did not want to leave their native France for the plague-infested and unfriendly city of Rome. And since the Orsini faction wanted to return to Rome, the Colonna faction chose the opposite and joined the French. A sufficient number of cardinals agreed to support him (2/3, or a minimum of 16 in number). Thus he could have been elected Pope had he been willing to swear to a condition not to return the papacy to Rome. Understandably, he refused his consent to the election on those terms.

The Cistercian cardinal, Jacques Fournier, was elected on the evening of 20 December 1334, after Vespers, on the eighth day of the conclave.

According to the Catholic Encyclopedia:

The cardinals in conclave, most of whom opposed a return to Rome, demanded of Cardinal de Comminges, whose election seemed assured, the promise to remain at Avignon. His refusal precipitated an unexpected canvass for candidates. On the first ballot, 20 December 1334, many electors, intending to sound the mind of the conclave, voted for the unlikely Cardinal Fournier, who, though he was one of the few men of real merit in the college, was but lightly regarded because of his obscure origin and lack of wealth and following. He amazed the conclave by receiving the necessary two-thirds vote. On 8 January 1335, he was enthroned as Benedict XII.

== Books and articles ==
- Ameri, Gianluca and Clario Di Fabio, Luca Fieschi: cardinale, collezionista, mecenate, 1300-1336 (Cinisello Balsamo (Milano) : Silvana, 2011).
- Baluzius, Stephanus [Étienne Baluze], Vitae Paparum Avinionensium 2 volumes (Paris: apud Franciscum Muguet 1693). (in Latin) "Secunda Vita Benedicti XII," 213–220. "Tertia Vita Benedicti XII," 219–225. "Quarta Vita Benedicti XII," 225–228. "Quinta Vita Benedicti XII," 229–244.
- Eubel, Konrad (1898). Hierarchia catholica medii aevi: sive Summorum pontificum, S.R.E. cardinalium, ecclesiarum antistitum series ab anno 1198 usque ad annum [1605] perducta e documentis tabularii praesertim Vaticani collecta, digesta (in Latin). Vol. I. Münster: sumptibus et typis librariae Regensbergianae. (second edition 1913).
- Bernardus Guidonis, "Vita Joannis Papae XXII," in Ludovicus Antonius Muratori, Rerum Italicarum Scriptores Tomus Tertius (Milan 1723), 673–684. (in Latin)
- Dragomanni, Francesco Gherardi (editor), Cronica di Giovanni Villani Tomo III (Firenze: Sansoni 1845).
- Duhamel, L. "Un neveu de Jean XXII, Le cardinal Arnaud de Via," Bulletin monumental 5 serie, Tome 11 (Paris 1883) 401–421.
- Jacob, Karl (1910). Studien uber Papst Benedikt XII. Berlin: R. Trenkel. pp. 20–24.
- Souchon, Martin. Die Papstwahlen von Bonifaz VIII bis Urban VI (Braunschweig: Benno Goeritz 1888).
- Theiner, Augustinus (Editor), Caesaris S. R. E. Cardinalis Baronii, Od. Raynaldi et Jac. Laderchii Annales Ecclesiastici Tomus Vigesimus Quartus 1313-1333 (Barri-Ducis: Ludovicus Guerin 1872); Tomus Vigesimus Quintus 1334-1355 (Barri-Ducis: Ludovicus Guerin 1872). (in Latin)
- Trollope, Thomas Adolphus. 1876. The Papal Conclaves, as they were and as they are.
