= Cardinals created by Benedict XII =

Catholic appointments in 1338

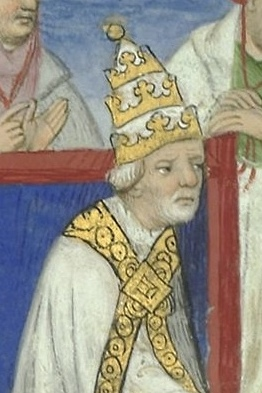
Pope Benedict XII (r. 1334–1342)

Pope Benedict XII (r. 1334–1342) created six new cardinals in one consistory celebrated on 18 December 1338:

1. Gozzio Battaglia, patriarch of Constantinople – cardinal-priest of S. Prisca (received the title on 12 May 1339), † 10 June 1348
2. Bertrand de Déaulx, archbishop of Embrun – cardinal-priest of S. Marco (received the title on 16 January 1339), then (4 November 1348) cardinal-bishop of Sabina, † 21 October 1355
3. Pierre Roger, O.S.B., archbishop of Rouen – cardinal-priest of SS. Nereo ed Achilleo (received the title on 12 May 1339), became Pope Clement VI on 7 May 1342, † 6 December 1352
4. Guillaume de Court, O.Cist., bishop of Albi – cardinal-priest of SS. IV Coronati (received the title on 16 January 1339), then (18 December 1350) cardinal-bishop of Tusculum, † 12 June 1361
5. Bernard d'Albi, bishop of Rodez – cardinal-priest of S. Ciriaco alle Terme (received the title on 2 August 1339), then (19 January 1349) cardinal-bishop of Porto e Santa Rufina, † 23 November 1350
6. Guillaume d'Aure, O.S.B., abbot of Montolieu – cardinal-priest of S. Stefano al Monte Celio (received the title on 16 January 1339), † 3 December 1353

Several later authors claimed that cardinal-priest of S. Stefano created in this consistory was Raymond de Montfort, O. de M., who died before the news of his promotion reached him, and it was only in January 1339 when Pope Benedict XII promoted Guillaume d'Aure in his place. Even Eubel (1913) still accepted this story. However, the contemporary Vitae Benedicti XII, and especially the documents from the registers of Benedict XII clearly deny this legend. Guillaume d'Aure is mentioned among the six newly created cardinals from the very beginning, and the alleged promotion of Montfort is not mentioned at all. As early as on 22 December 1338 Guillaume d'Aure is explicitly referred to as cardinal of the Holy Roman Church.

== Sources ==
- Konrad Eubel: Hierarchia Catholica, I, 1913, p. 17
- Etienne Blauze: Vitae paparum avenionensium, vols. I-II, ed. G. Mollat, Paris 1916-1927
- J. M. Vidal, Benoit XII. Lettres de communes, vol. II, Paris 1910
