= Pasteur de Sarrats =

French Franciscan friar, bishop and Cardinal

Cardinal Pasteur de Sarrats
- Cardinal-Priest
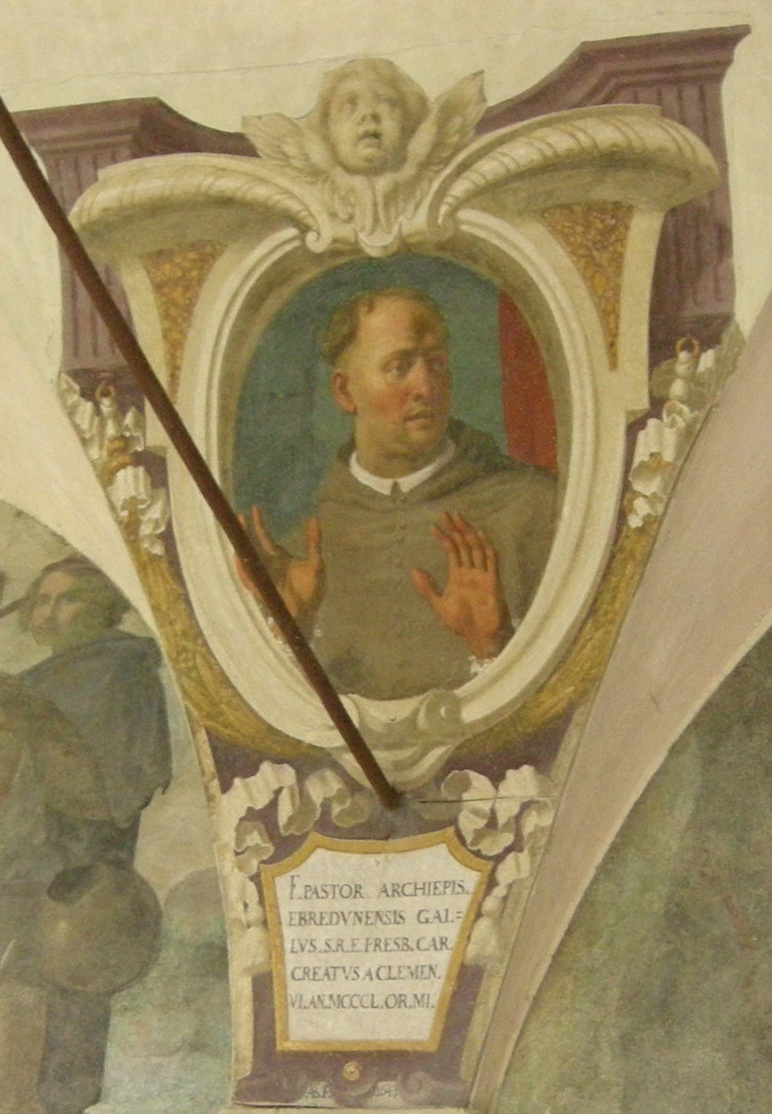
- Church: Saints Marcellinus and Peter (1350–1356)
- Diocese: Assisi (1337–1339); Embrun (1339–1350)

Orders
- Created cardinal: 17 December 1350 by Pope Innocent VI

Personal details
- Born: Vivarais FR
- Died: 11 October 1356 Avignon FR
- Buried: S. François, Avignon
- Occupation: monk, courtier, theologian
- Profession: bishop

Pasteur de Sarrats (or Sarrats d'Aubenas; Lat. Pastor de Serraescuderio, and Pastor de Vivariis) was a French Franciscan friar, bishop and Cardinal. He was born in the village of Aubenas in the Vivarais, or he took his monastic vows in the monastery of Aubenas. Pasteur may have had a brother. A bull of Benedict XII, dated 13 April 1337, grants the parish church of S. Martin de Valle Gorgia in the diocese of Viviers to Pierre de Serraescuderio, Canon of Viviers since 1333, who held a parish of S. Pierre de Melon in the diocese of Uzès. Pasteur died in Avignon in 1356.

== Student ==
He could have begun his studies at a Franciscan house in one of the University towns of the province, Avignon, Montpellier or Narbonne. With the permission of his Minister Provincial and the Provincial Chapter, he was one of those young scholars permitted to finish his study at the Franciscan convent in Paris, and to attend the University. He was already Minister Provincial of Provence (1329-1331) when the General Chapter of the Order of Friars Minor met in Paris in May and June 1329. William Courtenay speculates that, in the schism that developed in the Franciscan Order in 1329, under the leadership of Michael of Cesena and William of Ockham, Pasteur de Sarrats supported Pope John XXII. On 15 May 1329, Pope John XXII issued a decree replacing twenty of the schismatic Franciscan leaders with reliable persons recommended to him by Cardinal Bertrand de la Tour. One of these was Pasteur de Sarrats, who was appointed Minister Provincial of the Franciscan province of Provence.

== Theologian and teacher ==
He was granted permission in 1333, while still a Bachelor of Theology, to begin teaching the Sentences as soon as he completed his courses. Pasteur de Sarrats obtained the degree of Doctor of Theology from the University of Paris in the Spring of 1333. On 19 June 1333 he is referred to as Magister Pastor, Doctor in theologia. He enjoyed the title of professor in the convents of his Order where he taught theology.

On 1 August 1334 he was released from his vow of obedience to the Minister General of the Order of Friars Minor, Guiral Ot (Gerald Odonis). William Courtenay conjectures that this was because of a case that was assigned to Fr. Pasteur by the Pope in April 1334, to resolve a dispute between the Minister General, Guiral Ot, and the Minister Provincial of Austria and his Provincial Chapter. Fr. Pasteur found for the Austrians, and Courtenay writes that, perhaps because the decision offended Ot, or perhaps because of some other disagreement between them, Fr. Pasteur sought emancipation from Ot's control.

He was one of the theological experts with whom Pope Benedict XII consulted on the subject of beatific vision, as taught and subsequently recanted by Pope John XXII. In 1334 he was elected Minister Provincial of the Franciscan province of Provence (1334–1337), with the approval of Pope Benedict.

On 22 July 1336, Fr. Pasteur was paid a fee for examining the scripta dominii nostri pape ('writings of our Lord Pope') during the period June 23 to July 23. Another payment was made on 25 April 1337, for work done from December through April. On 17 August 1338, as Bishop of Assisi, he was part of a three-man committee that sat from 10 December 1337 to 11 March 1338 correcting the Pope's writings on Matthew.

== Bishop ==
On 1 October 1337 Pasteur de Sarrats was appointed Bishop of Assisi by Pope Benedict XII, a post he held for less than sixteen months. As the new bishop of Assisi, he was instructed by Pope Benedict to issue a mandate for about twenty Clarisses to be transferred to Naples, at the request of Queen Sancha, whose brother was a Franciscan, to act as examples for the younger nuns in the discipline of the Rule. The nuns belonged to the community of Corpus Christi in Naples. During this episcopacy, Bishop Pasteur's duties in Assisi were performed by a vicar, Fr. Alexander, O.Min., Bishop of Nocera. The evidence indicates that Bishop Pasteur stayed in Avignon and never went to Assisi.

On 13 February 1347, King Philip IV of France issued an edict, seizing the property in France of all clerics who lived outside of France, as well as the property of the Knights Hospitallers and members of the Papal Court. On March 29, Archbishop Pasteur de Sarrats was sent on a diplomatic mission, along with Bishop Guillaume Amici of Chartres, to the Philip VI of France, to get him to release Cardinal Petrus Bertrandi and others, who had been detained in a quarrel over money. On 10 July, the Pope ordered the two bishops to remain in Paris and work with the two cardinals resident there until the matter was sorted out. The envoys, with the assistance of the Queen, were eventually successful, at least as far as cardinals were concerned. The struggle over the immunity of the Church from taxation by the State, however, was far from over. The same issues which had stirred Philip the Fair and Boniface VIII were still active.

Pasteur de Sarrats was appointed Archbishop of Embrun on 27 January 1339, in succession to Bertrand de Déaulx, who was made a cardinal on the same day. He retained the office until he himself was promoted Cardinal in 1350. As Archbishop of Embrun, he was the recipient of a treatise written by John of Mirecourt, an Apology, in which he defended himself against questions concerning sixty-three statements made by him in his commentary on the Sentences.

== Cardinal ==
In his fourth Consistory for the creation of cardinals, held in Avignon on 17 December 1350, Pope Innocent VI named twelve new cardinals. Among them was Pastor de Serraescuderio, who was assigned the titulus of Saints Marcellinus and Peter in Rome.

He took part in the Conclave of 1352, which followed the death of Pope Clement VI on 6 December 1352. The Conclave's opening ceremonies took place on Sunday 16 December, after the official nine-day mourning period (Novendiales). There were extensive Electoral Capitulations, which were annulled by the new pope, Innocent VI on 6 July 1353 in the Bull Solicitudo pastoris. The Conclave lasted only two days, achieving a successful result on Tuesday 8 December, with the election of Cardinal Étienne Aubert of Limoges, the bishop of Ostia. He was crowned with the throne name Innocent VI on 30 December 1352. There is a myth that another person was first considered for the position, Dom Jean Birel, the twenty-second Superior General of the Carthusians, but this unlikely story has been successfully refuted.

== Death and entombment ==
Cardinal Pasteur de Sarrats died in Avignon on 11 October 1356, and was buried in the Church of the Franciscans.

== Bibliography ==
- Baluze [Baluzius], Etienne [Stephanus] (1693). Vitae paparum Avenionensium, hoc est, Historia pontificum romanorum qui in Gallia sederunt ab anno Christi MCCCV. usque ad annum MCCCXCIV (in Latin). Vol. Tomus primus. Paris: apud Franciscum Muguet.. Nouvelle edition by G. Mollat II (Paris 1927).
- Baluze, Etienne (1693). Vitae Paparum Avenionensium, Hoc est Historia Pontificum Romanorum qui in Gallia sederunt ab anno Christi MCCCV usque ad annum MCCCXCIV (in Latin). Vol. Tomus secundus. Paris: Muguet.
- Baronio, Cesare (1872). Augustinus Theiner (ed.). Annales ecclesiastici: A. D. 1-1571 denuo excusi et ad nostra usque tempora perducti ab Augustino Theiner (in Latin). Vol. Tomus vigesimus quintus (25). Barri-Ducis: Typis et sumptibus Ludovici Guerin.[1333-1356]
- Courtenay, William J. (1966). "Pastor de Serrescuderio (d. 1356) and MS Saint-Omer 239". Archives d'histoire doctrinale et litterarir du moyen age. 63: 325–356, at 330-331. ISBN 9782711612567.
- Duba, William and Christopher David Schabel, ed. (2009). Gerald Odonis, Doctor Moralis and Franciscan Minister General: Studies in Honour of L. M. de Rijk. New York/Leiden: Brill. ISBN 978-90-04-17850-2.
- Du Chesne, François (1660). Histoire De Tous Les Cardinaux François De Naissance (in French). Vol. Tome I. Paris: Aux despens de l' Autheur. pp. 523–524.
- Du Chesne, François (1660). Preuves de l' Histoire de tous les cardinaux François de naissance (in French and Latin). Paris: Aux despens de l'Autheur & se vendent chez luy. pp. 311–322.
- Ehrle, Franz [Franciscus] (1890). Historia bibliothecae romanorum pontificum: tum Bonifatianae tum Avenionensis (in Latin). Rome: Typis Vaticanis.
- Eubel, Konrad (1898). Hierarchia catholica medii aevi: sive Summorum pontificum, S.R.E. cardinalium, ecclesiarum antistitum series ab anno 1198 usque ad annum [1605] perducta e documentis tabularii praesertim Vaticani collecta, digesta (in Latin). Vol. I. Münster: sumptibus et typis librariae Regensbergianae. (second edition 1913).
- Fournier, Marcel (1892). Histoire de la science du droit en France (in French). Vol. Tome III. Paris: L. Larose & Forcel.
- Lützelschwab, Ralf (2007). Flectat cardinales ad velle suum? Clemens VI. und sein Kardinalskolleg: Ein Beitrag zur kurialen Politik in der Mitte des 14. Jahrhunderts (in German). Berlin: De Gruyter. pp. 479–481. ISBN 978-3-486-84130-5.
- Peano, Pierre (1975). "Ministres provinciaux de Provence et spirituels". Cahiers de Fanjeaux. 10: 41–65.
- Renouard, Yves (1970). The Avignon papacy, 1305-1403. Hamden CT USA: Archon Books. ISBN 978-0-208-01156-5.
- Rollo-Koster, Joëlle (2015). Avignon and Its Papacy, 1309–1417: Popes, Institutions, and Society. New York-London: Rowman & Littlefield Publishers. ISBN 978-1-4422-1534-4.
