= Pierre Bertrand =

Pierre Bertrand may refer to:

- Pierre Bertrand (cardinal) (1280–1348 or 1349), French cardinal and theologian
- Pierre Bertrand de Colombier (1299–1361), cardinal, nephew of the above
- Pierre Bertrand (politician) (1875–1948), Canadian politician
- Pierre Bertrand (singer) (born 1948), singer-songwriter and former member of Beau Dommage
- Pierre Bertrand (sound engineer) (born 1965), Canadian sound engineer, winner at 32nd Genie Awards
- Pierre Louis Bertrand, known as Pete Bertrand (racing driver) (1902–1942), Kansas racing driver, see Mr. Horsepower
