= Nicolas de Besse =

French bishop

Cardinal Nicolas de Besse
- Cardinal-Deacon
- Church: Santa Maria in Via Lata (1344-1369)
- Diocese: Limoges (1343-1344)

Orders
- Consecration: never consecrated
- Created cardinal: 19 May 1344 by Pope Clement VI

Personal details
- Born: 1322 Diocese of Limoges
- Died: 5 November 1369 (aged 46–47) Rome, IT
- Buried: Cathedral of Limoges
- Parents: Jacques de Besse; Almodie (Delphine) Roger
- Occupation: cleric

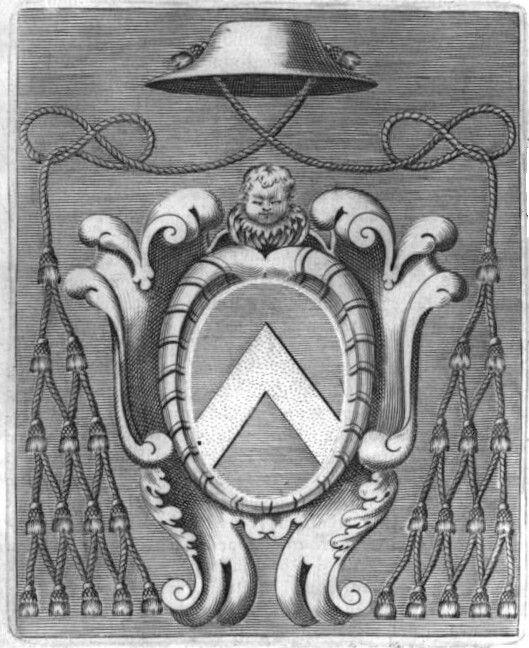
Stemma of Cardinal Nicolas de Besse

Nicolas de Besse was born in the diocese of Limoges, in 1322. He was a French bishop and Cardinal. He was the son of Jacques de Besse, Seigneur de Bellefaye and Almodie (Delphine) Roger, sister of Pope Clement VI. He had a brother Pierre de Besse, who became Seigneur de Bellefaye and who married Margueritte de Thiers. Nicolas de Besse died in Rome on 5 November 1369.

== Biography ==
In his youth he was sent by his uncle, who was Archbishop of Rouen at the time, to study in Paris, and later in Orleans. The Pope himself later recalled, "We began to bring him up, and we made him come to Paris and there we made him study. Later he studied in Orleans where he was still reading when we summoned him to the Curia."

=== Early preferment ===
He was a Canon of the Church of Paris by 1343. He was Archdeacon of Ponthieu in the diocese of Amiens, though only ordained in minor orders. He was also Chaplain and dining companion (commensualis) of his uncle, Pope Clement, in the Apostolic Palace in Avignon.

In 1343 Nicolas was also named Archdeacon of Condroz. He is also mentioned, in 1351, as being Archdeacon of Cologne. On 27 August 1343 his election to the Bishopric of Limoges was confirmed by Pope Clement VI. He was only twenty-one. He was never consecrated bishop. His successor was confirmed on 28 February 1344.

As Bishop of Limoges, Nicolas was present at the Papal Court in Avignon on 16 January 1344 when Louis IV the Bavarian swore fealty to Pope Clement VI.

=== Cardinal of Limoges ===
In his second Consistory for the creation of cardinals, held on 19 May 1344, Pope Clement VI created two cardinals, Pierre Bertrand de Colombier and Nicolas de Besse. In his speech (collatio) after the discussion and decision, Pope Clement remarked, "But what will you say about this Bishop of Limoges [Nicholas]? Truly we say what we said yesterday morning when we entered the Consistory, that we had thought so much about his promotion, and that we thought that the thing should not be. But on the petition of the whole College of Cardinals, with no dissenting vote, it seemed best to elevate him. There were cardinals who had said that they would not consent to the Bishop of Arras if we did not elevate this Nicholas. And therefore we have elevated him." Cardinal Nicolas was assigned the Deaconry of Santa Maria in Via Lata. He was, however, habitually called Lemoviciensis, the Cardinal of Limoges. On 2 December 1344, the new Cardinal was present at a Consistory at which the Pope issued a bull in favor of the Abbey of Jumièges. Fourteen cardinals subscribed, including Cardinal de Besse. The original document survives, as does his autograph signature.

=== Conclave of 1352 ===
Pope Clement died in Avignon on 6 December 1352. The Conclave to elect his successor opened on Sunday, 16 December 1352 in the Apostolic Palace in Avignon, with twenty-six cardinals in attendance, including Cardinal Nicolas de Besse. At mid-morning on 18 December they elected Cardinal Étienne Aubert, who took the name Innocent VI. He was crowned on 30 December 1352. Some months after the Conclave, in 1353, the body of the late pope was transferred to his monastery at La Chaise-Dieu (Casa Dei), where he lies in the center of the Choir of the church. He was accompanied in his last journey by five of his nephews, Cardinals Hugues Roger, Guillaume de la Jugié, Nicolas de Besse, Pierre Roger de Beaufort, and Guillaume d' Aigrefeuille.

In 1362, Cardinal Nicolas de Besse joined Cardinals Guy of Boulogne and Pierre de Belfort in an effort to arrange a settlement in a dispute between the Count of Armagnac and the Vicomte of Turenne concerning the Baronies of Pertuis, Meyrargues, Sederon, and Les Pennes. It was claimed that they were illegally occupied by the Vicomte, who claimed that he had been given them by King Louis and Queen Jeanne of Naples, the Count and Countess of Provence. The three cardinals were chosen because they were "parents et amis des deux parties." A financial settlement was arranged, but it did nothing to stop the violence and acquisitive spirit of the Vicomte.

=== Conclave of 1362 ===
In September 1362, after the death of Pope Innocent VI, the College of Cardinals was divided (according to Froissart) into two factions, one supporting Guy of Boulogne and the other Élie de Talleyrand for pope. In the end a compromise candidate was elected, Abbot Guillaume Grimoald of S. Vincent in Marseille, who was Legate of the Apostolic See in the Kingdom of Sicily, and was not present at the Conclave. He was not even a cardinal. The decision was taken perhaps on September 28, but it was not made public until the day after the arrival of Abbot Grimoald in Avignon, 31 October. Grimoald was proclaimed Pope Urban V.

Cardinal Nicolas was named Protector of the Order of Friars Minor (1366-1369), in succession to Cardinal Élie de Talleyrand de Périgord. In 1367 he was present in Assisi for the General Chapter of the Franciscans, which opened on 6 June, at which Fr. Thomas de Farignano was elected Minister General.

=== The visit to Rome ===
Pope Urban V had finally agreed to demands from every direction that he should return to Rome. On 20 May 1367, he and the Papal Court set sail from Marseille for Italy. Only five cardinals did not accompany the Pope on his journey. One who did was Nicolas de Besse. On 23 May the party was at Genoa, and on 1 June they were at Pisa. The party stopped in Viterbo while Pope Urban took the body of his late friend Cardinal Egidio Albornoz, who had died on 24 August, to Assisi, where he had wished to be buried in the Basilica of S. Francesco. On Saturday, October 16, 1367 there was again a Pope in Rome, and Urban remained there until 11 May 1368. On 31 October 1367 the Pope consecrated Cardinal Guillaume de Agrifolio Bishop of Sabina, and it was remarked that that was the first time since the reign of Boniface VIII (1295-1303) that a Pope had celebrated Mass at the high altar of St. Peter's. The Emperor Charles IV paid a visit to Italy in 1368, and, on All Saints Day, 1 November 1368, the Pope crowned the Empress Elizabeth in the Vatican Basilica. Cardinal Nicolas was likely present for all of these events.

Cardinal de Besse was in Rome along with Pope Urban in the autumn of 1369, and was assigned as one of the Cardinals who would witness the signing of the profession of faith of the Emperor John VI Kantakouzenos. The ceremonies took place in the Vatican Basilica in the presence of the Pope on 22 October.

=== Death and burial ===
It was in Rome on 5 November 1369, two weeks after the Emperor's profession, that Cardinal Nicolas de Besse died. His body was repatriated to France.

Cardinal Nicolas de Besse was interred in the Cathedral of Limoges, in the Chapel of S. Marie-Madaleine, later called the Chapel of S. Maurice.

== Bibliography ==
- Baluze [Baluzius], Etienne [Stephanus] (1693). Vitae paparum Avenionensium, hoc est, Historia pontificum romanorum qui in Gallia sederunt ab anno Christi MCCCV. usque ad annum MCCCXCIV (in Latin). Vol. Tomus primus. Paris: apud Franciscum Muguet.
- Baluze, Etienne (1693). Vitae Paparum Avenionensium, Hoc est Historia Pontificum Romanorum qui in Gallia sederunt ab anno Christi MCCCV usque ad annum MCCCXCIV (in Latin). Vol. Tomus secundus. Paris: Muguet.
- Baronio, Cesare (1872). Augustinus Theiner (ed.). Annales ecclesiastici: A. D. 1-1571 denuo excusi et ad nostra usque tempora perducti ab Augustino Theiner (in Latin). Vol. Tomus vigesimus quintus (25). Barri-Ducis: Typis et sumptibus Ludovici Guerin.
- Baronio, Cesare (1872). Augustin Theiner (ed.). Annales ecclesiastici: A. D. 1-1571 denuo excusi et ad nostra usque tempora perducti ab Augustino Theiner (in Latin). Vol. Tomus vigesimus sextus (26) (1356-1396). Barri-Ducis: Typis et sumptibus Ludovici Guerin.
- Berlier, Ursmer, ed. (1906). Suppliques de Clément VI (1342-1352): textes et analyses (in French and Latin). Rome-Bruges-Paris: Champion.
- Chaillan, Marius (Abbé) (1911). Le Bienheureux Urbain V (1310-1370) (second ed.). Paris: Victor Lecoffre. pp. 190–192.
- Eubel, Konrad (1898). Hierarchia catholica medii aevi: sive Summorum pontificum, S.R.E. cardinalium, ecclesiarum antistitum series ab anno 1198 usque ad annum [1605] perducta e documentis tabularii praesertim Vaticani collecta, digesta (in Latin). Vol. I. Münster: sumptibus et typis librariae Regensbergianae.
- Berliere, Ursmer; Philippe Van Isacker, eds. (1924). Lettres de Clément VI (1342-1352): Textes et analyses (in French and Latin). Institut historique belge.
- Pélissier, Antoine (1961). Innocent VI: le Réformateur; deuxième pape limousin (1352-1362) (in French). F. Layotte.
- Guillemain, Bernard (1962). La cour pontificale d'Avignon: (1309-1376) (in French). Paris: E. De Boccard.
- Renouard, Yves (1970). The Avignon papacy, 1305-1403. Hamden CT USA: Archon Books. ISBN 978-0-208-01156-5.
- Wood, Diana (1989). Clement VI: The Pontificate and Ideas of an Avignon Pope. Cambridge UK: Cambridge University Press. ISBN 978-0-521-89411-1.
- Rollo-Koster, Joëlle (2015). Avignon and Its Papacy, 1309–1417: Popes, Institutions, and Society. New York-London: Rowman & Littlefield Publishers. ISBN 978-1-4422-1534-4.
