= Pierre Desprès =

French cardinal

Cardinal Pierre Desprès
- Cardinal-Bishop
- Church: Santa Pudenziana (1321-1323)
- Diocese: Palestrina (1323-1361)

Orders
- Created cardinal: 20 December 1320 by Pope John XXII

Personal details
- Born: 1288 Montpezat-de-Quercy FR
- Died: 16 May 1361 (aged 72–73) Avignon FR
- Buried: Montpezat FR
- Parents: Raymond II Desprès, seigneur of Montpezat; Aspasie de Montaigut
- Occupation: lawyer, teacher
- Education: Doctorate in Civil Law
- Alma mater: Toulouse

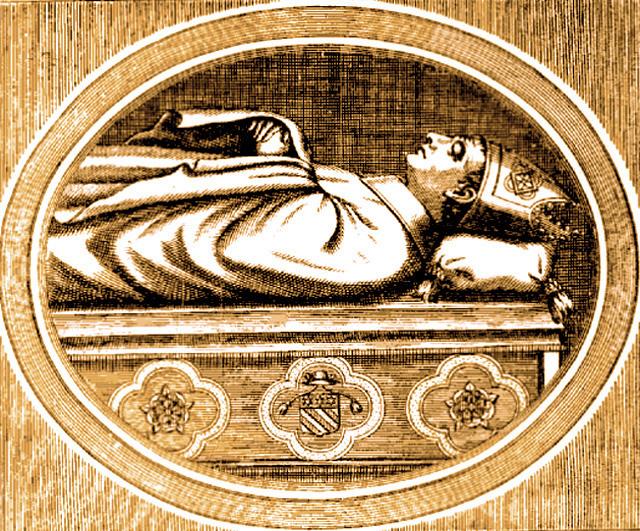
Pierre Desprès

Pierre Desprès (or Des Près, or Des Prés; Lat. de Pratis) (1288–1361) was a French Cardinal during the period of the Avignon Papacy.

== Biography ==
Pierre Desprès was born in 1288, at Montpezat-de-Quercy. He was the son of Raymond II Desprès, seigneur of Montpezat, and Aspasie de Montaigut, the heiress of Bertrand, seigneur de Montaigut. He had a brother, Raymond, who was ennobled in 1325. Pesserat points out that Montpezat was an important town, being the seat of the Archdeacon of Montpezat in the diocese of Cahors, who was also Sacristan of the Cathedral. Not at all coincidentally, Pope John XXII was a native of Cahors, and his father had been Sieur de Saint-Félix en Quercy. With his expertise in the law as a teacher and practitioner, and with his experience as a judge in the Roman Curia, Pierre Desprès was appointed Vice-Chancellor of the Church by John XXII, where he served from 1325 to 1361. He was thus head of the Papal Secretariat, in charge of the drafting of papal bulls and letters, and a principal papal advisor. The post was also one of the most lucrative in the Roman Curia, since a fee was charged for every document and the Vice-Chancellor received a share of every fee.

By 8 January 1308 Desprès was Canon of the church of Batilhaco in the diocese of Clermont. In 1314 he is named as being present as Doctor legum when the Faculty of Law at the University of Toulouse was granted its charter. On 22 September 1316 he was appointed Canon in the Church of Tournai.

On 9 April 1317, Desprès, as Canon of Saintes, was appointed along with Bishop Galhard de Saumade of Riez to collect and administer the property of the condemned and deposed Bishop of Cahors, Hugues Géraud. Hugues and others had conspired to attack and murder Pope John XXII. Magic and poison were involved. On 7 May 1317, he is addressed as Canon of Tournai, when Pope John XXII appointed him, along with Bishop Galhard de Saumade of Riez to collect evidence as to the crimes of Master Bernard de Artigia, papal Chaplain and Cantor of Poitiers, who was one of the conspirators, and draw up an indictment.

=== Bishop ===
By 1 September 1317 Desprès was a Chaplain of Pope John XXII, and Provost of the church of Clermont, as well as Auditor causarum Sacri Palatii (judge). Desprès was named Bishop of Riez on 31 March 1318 by Pope John XXII, after the incumbent Galhard Saumate was transferred to Maguelonne. Desprès was not the first choice; Galhard de Pressac, Bishop of Toulouse refused the transfer. He received the episcopal consecration from Cardinal Nicolò Albertini, Bishop of Ostia, before 7 May 1318. Pierre Desprès held the diocese until 11 September 1318. On 11 September 1318 he was appointed archbishop of Aix, a position he held for an equally brief time, until 20 December 1320.

=== Cardinal ===
In the consistory of 20 December 1320, the third of his reign for the promotion of cardinals, Pope John XXII created Pierre Desprès a Cardinal Priest. He was apparently not in Avignon at the time, since he went for some weeks without having a title assigned. On 28 January 1321 he was still without a title, when he was granted the benefice of the church of S. Laugerius in the diocese of Aix. But in due course he received the title of Santa Pudenziana.

Then he was named bishop of Palestrina (25 May 1323) and Vice-Chancellor of the Holy Roman Church (20 April 1325 – 7 May 1361). That pair of promotions was extraordinarily swift, showing the degree of confidence placed in Pierre Desprès' skills by Pope John XXII.

In February 1326, Cardinal Desprès sat as an examiner in the case of William de Cotes, who had appeared at the Papal Court attempting to obtain relief against the Bishop of Worcester, who had sequestrated the rectory of Seynesbury. The Bishop had written to the Pope, pointing out that the benefice had been obtained with forged bulls, supplied by one William de Alveston, a cleric of the diocese of Worcester; William de Cotes confessed to Cardinal Pierre, and the arrest and interrogation of William de Alveston was ordered.

In July 1327, the Cardinal consecrated Walter, Bishop of Cork in Ireland.

In 1332 Pope John XXII commissioned Cardinal Pierre Desprès and Cardinal Pierre de Mortemart of Limoges to act as arbitrators in the dispute between Ademar de la Voulte, Bishop of Valence (1331-1336), and Aymar of Poitou Count of Valence, over the ownership of the town of Crista.

=== Conclave of 1334 ===
Pope John XXII died in the Apostolic Palace in Avignon on 4 December 1334. The day before, he held a meeting at his deathbed of the cardinals who were in Avignon. At this meeting he made his retraction of his views on beatific vision. Cardinal Pierre Desprès was one of those who participated in the event. The Conclave to elect his successor began on 13 December 1334, with twenty-four cardinals, Pierre Desprès among them, in attendance. A majority of the cardinals had decided that they did not want to return the papacy to Rome, and that therefore they would not elect anyone who would not swear to keep the papacy in Avignon. There was a two-thirds majority of the cardinals who were prepared to vote for Cardinal Jean-Raymond de Comminges, the Bishop of Porto. He, however, had the strongest objections to the legality and propriety of taking such an oath. On the evening of 20 December a two-thirds majority finally settled on Cardinal Jacques Fournier, O.Cist., the cardinal protopriest. He was crowned as Pope Benedict XII on 8 January 1335.

Cardinal Pierre Desprès assisted in the revision of the Statutes of the Franciscans. The revision was published by Pope Benedict XII on 28 November 1336. This was not the Cardinal's first experience with Franciscan statutes and discipline. He was present on 1 August 1331 along with seven other cardinals (one of whom was Jacques Fournier, the future Benedict XII), when Pope John XXII issued a viva voce precept to two of the ministers of the Franciscan Order that they should observe the Rule of St. Francis, as well as the Constitutions of Nicholas III and Clement V, on the use of money. Fr. Guiral Ot, Minister General of the Franciscans was present and acted as witness.

Cardinal Desprès became Dean of the College of Cardinals following the death of Cardinal Guillaume Pierre Godin, OP, on 4 June 1336.

In March 1342, the Cardinal consecrated William, Bishop of St. Andrews, in Scotland.

=== Conclave of 1342 ===
Pope Benedict XII died on 25 April 1342. Cardinal Desprès presided over the Conclave of 1342, though it cannot be said that he was a major force. Eighteen cardinals entered Conclave on Sunday, 5 May 1342, and produced a new Pope only two days later. The successful candidate was Cardinal Jacques Fournier of Limoges, former Chancellor of King Philip VI of France. He was fifty years of age. He was crowned on Pentecost Sunday, 19 May 1342, and took the throne name Clement VI.

As early as 1324 Cardinal Desprès had the consent of Pope John XXII to establish a community of priests in Montpezat, but it was Benedict XII who authorized Saint-Martin to become a prioral church with six chaplains and two clerks. On 15 July 1343, Clement VI authorized the addition of six more chaplains and a change in name of the ruler of the church from Prior to Dean. In 1343, therefore, the Cardinal carried out the foundation and endowment of a Collegiate Church, called Saint-Martin, in his home-town of Montpezat-de-Quercy. The corporation was to consist of fifteen canons. It was to be financed by the grant of a number of parishes in the diocese of Cahors, as many as one quarter of the churches in the diocese; though, as it turned out, the greater part of the Collegiate Church's income was to come from Requiem Masses said by the various priests for the benefit of various donors.

On 30 June 1342, during the pontificate of Clement VI, he was appointed as papal legate with Annibaldo di Ceccano, Bishop of Tusculum, to establish peace between France and England in the Hundred Years' War. Their mission was only partially successful: they arranged a truce in Malestroit in January 1343. Another mission was sent in November 1345, with Annibaldo di Ceccano, but not with Pierre Desprès, who was replaced by Cardinal Étienne Aubert.

In 1345 he is on record as being Archdeacon of York, and Canon and Prebend of Wistowe in the Church of York. He was provided on 1 June 1321, and was admitted on 14 September 1321; he held the post until his death on 30 September 1361. Before his promotion to York in 1321, Pierre Desprès was Archdeacon of Rochester. He also held benefices in the Spanish churches. He was Archdeacon of Xàtiva in the Church of Valencia, he held the Decemberprovostship in the Cathedral of Valencia, and he held a prebend in the Cathedral of Mallorca.

In 1348, Cardinal Desprès acted as examiner of candidates for the office of papal notary. He performed the same service in 1352. In March 1349 the Cardinal consecrated Thomas, Bishop of Leighlin in County Carlow, Ireland. In June 1352 he consecrated John, Bishop of Cloyne, Ireland. In January 1353 he consecrated Gregory, Bishop of Down in Ireland. In the same month he consecrated Nicholas, Bishop of Meath in Ireland. In June 1355 he consecrated John, Bishop of Dunkeld in Scotland.

=== Conclave of 1352 ===
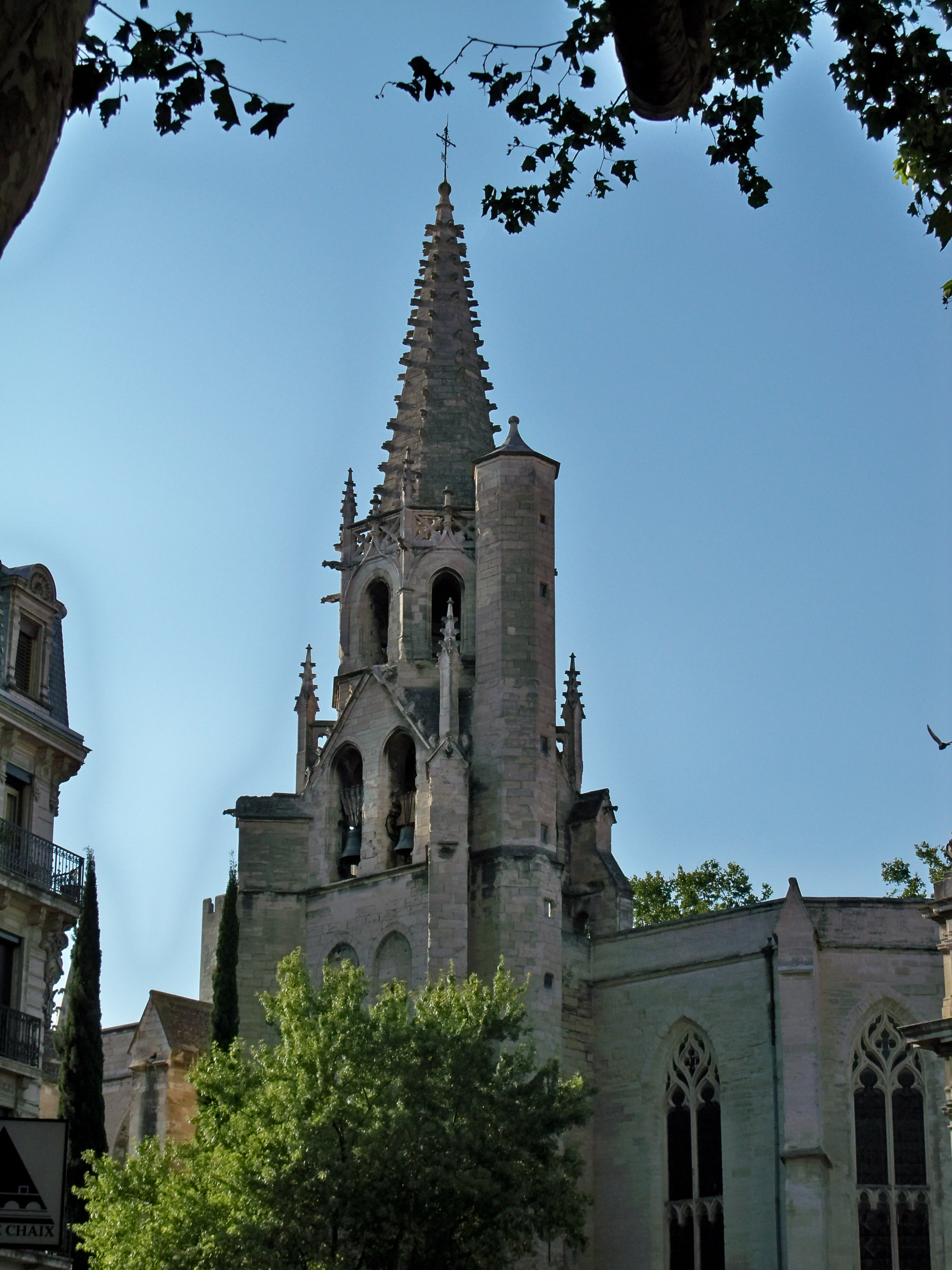
Saint-Pierre, Avignon

Pope Clement VI died in the Apostolic Palace in Avignon on 6 December 1352. Cardinal Pierre Desprès, Bishop of Palestrina and Dean of the College of Cardinals, presided over the Conclave of 1352. Despite the fact that he was Vice-Chancellor of the Church, the evidence does not indicate that he was a major force in the discussions, or that he had much time to become an influence. The leaders of the two major factions were Cardinal Guy de Boulogne and Cardinal Hélie de Talleyrand-Périgord, each of whom controlled sufficient votes to deny members of the other party the canonically necessary two-thirds of the votes for a successful election. There was plenty to fight about. The cardinals eventually drew up a set of Electoral Capitulations, which are enumerated by the new Pope, Innocent VI, in the bull by which he annulled them. The Conclave opened on Sunday, 16 December, and came to a successful conclusion on Tuesday, 18 December, with the election of Cardinal Étienne Aubert (Stephanus Alberti). The swiftness of the election is attributed to the fact that it was known by the cardinals that King John II of France was on his way to Avignon, intending to have a pope who would serve his interests. Wanting to preserve the liberty of the Church and their own, the Cardinals put aside their customary leisurely pace and produced a Pope before the King's arrival.

In 1355, Cardinal Pierre Desprès was assigned as arbitrator between Andruin, Abbot of Cluny and Philip Abbot of Sancti Sequani (Saint-Seine) in the diocese of Mâcon, in a dispute that reached back to the time of Pope Boniface VIII. On 25 September 1355 Pope Innocent VI issued a bull, confirming the decision of Cardinal Desprès, requiring the payment of 50 gold florins to Cluny every year on All Saints' Day.

In 1358, Cardinal Desprès rebuilt the Church of Saint-Pierre in Avignon, which had last been repaired in the tenth century and had fallen into ruins. He established it as a Collegiate Church with Canons.

=== Death and tomb ===
Cardinal Pierre Desprès died of plague on 16 May 1361 (or 30 September 1361), at the age of 73. He was buried in the Collegiate Church of Montpezat in the Choir. His marble effigy survives and is classed as an historical monument by the French Ministère de la Culture et de la Communication.

== Bibliography ==
- Albe, Edmond (1904). Autour de Jean XXII.: Hugues Géraud, évêque de Cahors. L'affaire des poisons et des envoûtements en 1317 (in French). Paris: Société des Études Littéraires, Scientifiques et Artistiques du Lot.
- Baluze [Baluzius], Etienne [Stephanus] (1693). Vitae paparum Avenionensium, hoc est, Historia pontificum romanorum qui in Gallia sederunt ab anno Christi MCCCV. usque ad annum MCCCXCIV (in Latin). Vol. Tomus primus. Paris: apud Franciscum Muguet. Nouvelle edition by G. Mollat II (Paris 1927).
- Baluze, Etienne (1693). Vitae Paparum Avenionensium, Hoc est Historia Pontificum Romanorum qui in Gallia sederunt ab anno Christi MCCCV usque ad annum MCCCXCIV (in Latin). Vol. Tomus secundus. Paris: Muguet.
- Baronio, Cesare (1872). Augustin Theiner (ed.). Annales ecclesiastici: A. D. 1-1571 denuo excusi et ad nostra usque tempora perducti ab Augustino Theiner (in Latin). Vol. Tomus vigesimus quartus (24). Paris: Typis et sumptibus Ludovici Guerin. [1313-1333]
- Baronio, Cesare (1872). Augustinus Theiner (ed.). Annales ecclesiastici: A. D. 1-1571 denuo excusi et ad nostra usque tempora perducti ab Augustino Theiner (in Latin). Vol. Tomus vigesimus quintus (25). Barri-Ducis: Typis et sumptibus Ludovici Guerin.[1333-1356]
- Bliss, William H., ed. (1895). Calendar of Entries in the Papal Registers Relating to Great Britain and Ireland: Papal Letters. Vol. II (1305-1342). London: H.M. Stationery Office.
- Bliss, William Henry; Johnson, C. (1897). Calendar of Entries in the Papal Registers Relating to Great Britain and Ireland: Papal Letters. Vol. III (1342-1362). London: H.M. Stationery Office.
- Du Chesne, François (1660). Histoire De Tous Les Cardinaux François De Naissance: (in French). Vol. Tome I. Paris: Aux despens de l' Autheur. pp. 465–470.
- Du Chesne, François (1660). Preuves de l' Histoire de tous les cardinaux François de naissance (in French and Latin). Paris: Aux despens de l'Autheur & se vendent chez luy. pp. 311–322.
- Eubel, Konrad (1898). Hierarchia catholica medii aevi: sive Summorum pontificum, S.R.E. cardinalium, ecclesiarum antistitum series ab anno 1198 usque ad annum [1605] perducta e documentis tabularii praesertim Vaticani collecta, digesta (in Latin). Vol. I. Münster: sumptibus et typis librariae Regensbergianae. (second edition 1913).
- Lützelschwab, Ralf (2007). Flectat cardinales ad velle suum? Clemens VI. und sein Kardinalskolleg: Ein Beitrag zur kurialen Politik in der Mitte des 14. Jahrhunderts (in German). Berlin: De Gruyter. pp. 471–472. ISBN 978-3-486-84130-5.
- Meras, Mathieu (1962). "Le Cardinal Pierre des Pres". Bulletin de la Société archéologique de Tarn-et-Garonne. 88: 27–45.
- Passerat, Georges (1993). "La collegiale et ses canons". Bulletin de la Société Archéologique de Tarn-et-Garonne. 118: 197–206.
- Renouard, Yves (1970). The Avignon papacy, 1305-1403. Hamden CT USA: Archon Books. ISBN 978-0-208-01156-5.
- Rollo-Koster, Joëlle (2015). Avignon and Its Papacy, 1309–1417: Popes, Institutions, and Society. New York-London: Rowman & Littlefield Publishers. ISBN 978-1-4422-1534-4.
