= Guillaume d'Aure =

French Catholic cardinal (d. 1353)

Cardinal Guillaume d'Aure
- Cardinal-Priest
- Church: S. Stefano in Monte Celio (1338-1353)

Orders
- Created cardinal: 18 December 1338 by Pope Benedict XII

Personal details
- Born: Toulouse
- Died: 3 December 1353 Avignon FR
- Buried: Abbey of Montolieu FR
- Parents: Dodon, Count of Comminges; Bertrande, Countess d'Aure
- Occupation: Benedictine monk
- Education: Doctorate in Canon and Civil Law

Guillaume d'Aure, OSB, was born in Toulouse, France and died on 3 December 1353 in Avignon. He was a French Benedictine monk and Cardinal. He was the son of Bernard VII Dodon, Count of Comminges, and Bertrande, Countess d'Aure, daughter of Arnaud, Vicomte de l'Arboust. He had a brother, Raymond Roger d'Aure.

== Biography ==
=== Abbot ===
Guillaume began his religious life by taking the Benedictine habit, professing his vows, and living for a number of years in the Abbey of Lézat. The Abbey lay in the ancient diocese of Toulouse, some thirty miles south of the city. Later, after an ecclesiastical reorganization in the diocese of Rieux. Lézat became a dependency of the abbey of Moissat. In 1326, Guillaume became Abbot of the monastery of Aynai (Athanacum) in Lyon (1326-1330). He took a degree as Doctor in utroque iure (Civil Law and Canon Law). He was named Abbot of the Abbey of Montolieu (Montis Olivi) in the diocese of Carcassonne in 1333, by appointment of Pope John XXII.

Benedict XII gave Abbot Guillaume and five other abbots, all Doctors in utroque iure, the task of drawing up the new statutes for the reform of the Order of St. Benedict. The revised statutes were published by Benedict XII on 20 June 1336. In 1338, Guillaume and Bertrand de Deaulx, Archbishop of Embrun, were named Assessors by Pope Benedict XII to arbitrate the case between the Bishop of Maguelone and the University of Montpellier. The University had drawn up some new statutes, which (the Bishop believed) infringed his traditional rights as bishop of the diocese in which the University was situated. The two arbitrators were unable to reach a solution at the time when both were elevated to the cardinalate. Cardinal Bertrand in 1339 imposed a settlement, in favor of the bishop. When Guillaume became a cardinal, he was succeeded as Abbot of Montolieu by his brother Raymond Roger (died 7 November 1347), who had also been a monk at Lézat.

=== Cardinal ===
Abbot Guillaume was one of six prelates who were created cardinals by Pope Benedict XII in the Consistory of 18 December 1338, the only occasion on which Pope Benedict created cardinals. Three of the new cardinals were present, including Cardinal Guillaume. He was assigned the titular church of S. Stefano in Monte Celio in January 1339.

=== Benefices ===
On 16 February 1339, Cardinal Guillaume was granted the Priory of Podioleni (a dependency of the Abbey of Cluny) in the diocese of Orange, the Priory of Cenaco (a dependency of the Abbey of Moissac) in the diocese of Sarlat, the Priory of Saint Marcel de Sauseto in the diocese of Valence, the Priory of Saint Georges de Didonia in the diocese of Saintes, and the Priory of Chadalion in the diocese of Clermont. On 16 March he was granted the Priory of Grassaco in the diocese of Le Puy. These benefices were intended to provide sufficient income for him to maintain the position of a cardinal in the Papal Court in Avignon. On 2 June 1339 the Cardinal was granted the right to make a Last Will and Testament.

In July 1340 Cardinal Guillaume was serving as Auditor (Judge) by special appointment of Benedict XII in the case of the disputed election in the monastery of Saint Bavo of Gand in the diocese of Tournay. On 16 May 1341, Cardinal Guillaume and Cardinal Bertrand de Deaulx were handed the case of an appeal against unjust sentences imposed by several church officials against persons in Lombardy.

=== Conclaves ===
Cardinal d'Aure participated in the Conclave of 1342, following the death of Benedict XII on 25 April. Eighteen cardinals participated in the Conclave, fourteen of whom were French, three Italian, and one Spanish. Four of the cardinals belonged to religious orders. The Conclave began in the Apostolic Palace in Avignon on Sunday, 5 May 1342, and ended two days later, on 7 May, with the election of Cardinal Pierre Roger, who was crowned as Pope Clement VI on Pentecost Sunday, 19 May, in the Dominican Church in Avignon. In attendance were Prince John, the heir of King Philip VI of France and Duke of Normandy; Jacques, the Duke of Bourbon; Philip, the Duke of Burgundy; and Imbert, the Dauphin of Vienne.

On 12 July 1343, Cardinal d'Aure, with a certain amount of nostalgia, presented his old monastic home, the Abbey of Lésat, a silver-gilt cross, adorned with his arms, weighing some fourteen marks; a silver chalice with a gilded paten; two gilded silver ewers, weighing some fifteen marks; and two hundred gold florins, to be converted into rental property which should bring in ten livres Tournois. He asked the Abbey to institute two anniversary commemorations on 20 December and 22 March, which were to be converted into Requiem Masses after his death.

=== Death, tomb, testament ===
Pope Clement VI died in Avignon on 6 December 1352, the Feast of St. Nicholas. Guillaume d'Aure and twenty-five other cardinals took part in the Conclave of 1352, which began on Sunday 16 December. On the morning of Tuesday 18 December, they elected the Limousin Cardinal Étienne Aubert, who was crowned on Sunday, 30 December as Innocent VI.

Cardinal Guillaume d'Aure died less than a year later, on 3 December 1353. He was buried in the Abbey of Montolieu in the middle of the choir, with an image of him on the tomb cover. The monument was destroyed by the Huguenots.

== Bibliography ==
- Baluze [Baluzius], Etienne [Stephanus] (1693). Vitae paparum Avenionensium, hoc est, Historia pontificum romanorum qui in Gallia sederunt ab anno Christi MCCCV. usque ad annum MCCCXCIV (in Latin). Vol. Tomus primus. Paris: apud Franciscum Muguet.
- Baluze, Etienne (1693). Vitae Paparum Avenionensium, Hoc est Historia Pontificum Romanorum qui in Gallia sederunt ab anno Christi MCCCV usque ad annum MCCCXCIV (in Latin). Vol. Tomus secundus. Paris: Muguet.
- Du Chesne, François (1660). Histoire De Tous Les Cardinaux François De Naissance: (in French). Vol. Tome I. Paris: Aux despens de l' Autheur. pp. 465–470.
- Du Chesne, François (1660). Preuves de l' Histoire de tous les cardinaux François de naissance (in French and Latin). Paris: Aux despens de l'Autheur & se vendent chez luy. pp. 311–322.
- Eubel, Konrad (1898). Hierarchia catholica medii aevi: sive Summorum pontificum, S.R.E. cardinalium, ecclesiarum antistitum series ab anno 1198 usque ad annum [1605] perducta e documentis tabularii praesertim Vaticani collecta, digesta (in Latin). Vol. I. Münster: sumptibus et typis librariae Regensbergianae. (second edition 1913).
- Renouard, Yves (1970). The Avignon papacy, 1305-1403. Hamden CT USA: Archon Books. ISBN 978-0-208-01156-5.
- Rollo-Koster, Joëlle (2015). Avignon and Its Papacy, 1309–1417: Popes, Institutions, and Society. New York-London: Rowman & Littlefield Publishers. ISBN 978-1-4422-1534-4.
