= Imbert du Puy =

French Cardinal of the fourteenth century

Cardinal Imbert du Puy
- Cardinal-Priest
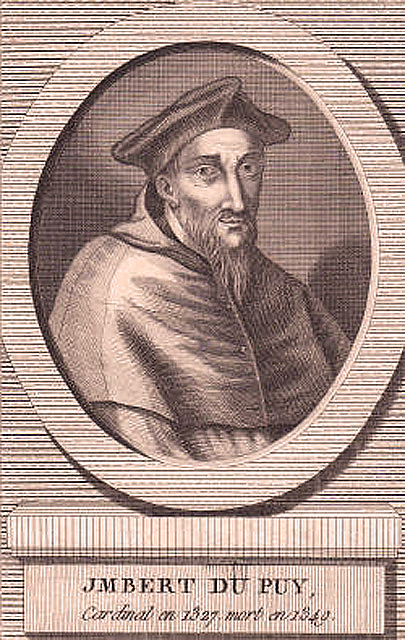
- Church: Basilica XII Apostolorum (1327-1348)

Orders
- Created cardinal: 18 December 1327 by Pope John XXII

Personal details
- Born: Montpellier
- Died: 26 May 1348 Avignon FR
- Occupation: courtier
- Coat of arms

Imbert du Puy (DuPuy, Dupuis; Lat. Imbertus de Podio, Ital. Umberto del Pozzo) (born at Montpellier in Languedoc, died in Avignon on 26 May 1348) was a French cardinal. He was a nephew of Pope John XXII.

Imbert du Puy was a Protonotary Apostolic. At the time of his elevation to the cardinalate Imbert Du Puy was Archdeacon of Langres.

In his fourth Consistory for the creation of cardinals, held on 18 December 1327, Pope John XXII created ten new cardinals, among them Imbert Du Puy. He was named Cardinal Priest of the Basilica of the Twelve Apostles (XII Apostolorum), which had been unassigned since 1281. He was given a Prebend in the Cathedral of St. Paul's in the diocese of London in January 1328, but such a conflict arose at the time of the installation that the cathedral needed to be reconsecrated.

Cardinal du Puy participated in the Conclave of 1334, which elected Pope Benedict XII.

He was granted the Priory of Saintville in the diocese of Aix; the Priory of Vaugines in the diocese of Aix; and the Priory of Saint-Baudile in the diocese of Nîmes.

Early in 1340, Cardinal Imbert was a member of a committee of cardinals, with Pierre Després of Palestrina and Napoleone Orsini of S. Adriano, to examine the election and suitability of Jean de Tréal, Abbot of Rothonensis in the diocese of Vannes. The election was approved by Pope Benedict on 17 March 1340.

He was elected Chamberlain of the College of Cardinals on 11 July 1340, in succession to Cardinal Pedro Gomez Barroso. He held the post until his death.

In 1341 he was appointed by Pope Benedict XII to a committee of three cardinals to investigate the election and suitability of Giovanni Zaulini to be Archbishop of Antivari in Epirus. The Pope's final approval was given on 17 December 1341.

In 1342, Cardinal du Puy resigned the Provostship of the church of Poson in the diocese of Esztergom (Strigonia), so that he could take up the parochial church of Saint-Paul de Frontiniano (Frontignan) in the diocese of Maguelonne. Both appointments involved the care of souls, and therefore two could not be held at the same time.

Imbert du Puy participated in the Conclave of 1342, which elected Pope Clement VI.

In the Spring of 1344 the Cardinal bought some fields with two farmhouses from King James of Majorca, who was also Lord of Montpellier, and the transaction was certified by King Philip VI of France on 19 June. The purchase was no doubt intended as an investment, finally becoming part of a foundation project. The Cardinal also purchased the Hospital of the Teutonic Knights in Montpellier. There is a record of an amortization of one hundred librae of land to found and endow two chapels, one of them dedicated to the Holy Savior (Saint Sauveur). In fact, the chapel was erected as a Collegiate Church, with twelve chaplains and twelve deacons. The transaction was registered with the King of France and approved in a bull by Pope Innocent VI. The Prior and Sacristan of the Collegiate Church were charged with the duty of maintaining hospitality in the Hospital of the Teutonic Knights, which was deeded to them as part of the foundation project.

Cardinal Imbert du Puy died on 26 May 1348 in Avignon. The Bishop of Maguelonne, Arnaud de Verdale (1339-1352), was present at his deathbed. He left a Testament, the executor of which was Cardinal (Pierre) Bertrand du Pouget, which is referred to in the documents concerning the Church of the Holy Savior.

Concerning Cardinal Imbert, the author of the lives of the Avignon popes, Étienne Baluze, remarks: "Neither then [when he was made a cardinal] nor afterward was he distinguished in the Curia, nor was he ever entrusted with a legation to any princes, however long a time he spent as a cardinal."

== Bibliography ==
- Baluze [Baluzius], Etienne [Stephanus] (1693). Vitae paparum Avenionensium, hoc est, Historia pontificum romanorum qui in Gallia sederunt ab anno Christi MCCCV. usque ad annum MCCCXCIV (in Latin). Vol. Tomus primus. Paris: apud Franciscum Muguet.
- Baluze, Etienne (1693). Vitae Paparum Avenionensium, Hoc est Historia Pontificum Romanorum qui in Gallia sederunt ab anno Christi MCCCV usque ad annum MCCCXCIV (in Latin). Vol. Tomus secundus. Paris: Muguet.
- Du Chesne, François (1660). Histoire De Tous Les Cardinaux François De Naissance: (in French). Vol. Tome I. Paris: Aux despens de l' Autheur. pp. 465–470.
- Du Chesne, François (1660). Preuves de l' Histoire de tous les cardinaux François de naissance (in French and Latin). Paris: Aux despens de l'Autheur & se vendent chez luy. pp. 311–322.
- Eubel, Konrad (1898). Hierarchia catholica medii aevi: sive Summorum pontificum, S.R.E. cardinalium, ecclesiarum antistitum series ab anno 1198 usque ad annum [1605] perducta e documentis tabularii praesertim Vaticani collecta, digesta (in Latin). Vol. I. Münster: sumptibus et typis librariae Regensbergianae. (second edition 1913).
- Lützelschwab, Ralf (2007). Flectat cardinales ad velle suum? Clemens VI. und sein Kardinalskolleg: Ein Beitrag zur kurialen Politik in der Mitte des 14. Jahrhunderts (in German). Berlin: De Gruyter. pp. 471–472. ISBN 978-3-486-84130-5.
- Renouard, Yves (1970). The Avignon papacy, 1305-1403. Hamden CT USA: Archon Books. ISBN 978-0-208-01156-5.
- Rollo-Koster, Joëlle (2015). Avignon and Its Papacy, 1309–1417: Popes, Institutions, and Society. New York-London: Rowman & Littlefield Publishers. ISBN 978-1-4422-1534-4.
