= Gilles Aycelin de Montaigu =

French religious leader and diplomat

Gilles Aycelin de Montaigut
- Cardinal-Bishop of Frascati
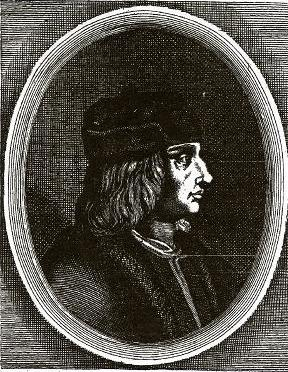
- Church: Catholic Church
- Diocese: Suburbicarian Diocese of Frascati
- In office: 26 July 1368 – 5 December 1378
- Predecessor: Niccolò Capocci
- Successor: Thomas of Frignano
- Previous post: Cardinal-Priest of Santi Silvestro e Martino ai Monti (1361-1368)

Orders
- Created cardinal: 17 September 1361 by Pope Innocent VI

Personal details
- Born: County of Auvergne, Duchy of Aquitaine, Kingdom of France
- Died: 5 December 1378 Avignon, Comtat Venaissin, Papal States

Gilles II Aycelin de Montaigu or Montaigut, Montagu, was a French religious and diplomat who became Lord Chancellor of France, Cardinal from 1361 and bishop of Frascati from 1368. He was the chief negotiator for Jean II of France with the English, in the aftermath of the battle of Poitiers. Towards the end of his life he lived in Avignon on a livery from Cambrai. He died in there on 5 December 1378.

== Biography ==
Born in the early years of the 14th century, Gilles Aycelin came from an Auvergnat family with several prominent members in his period. Brother of Pierre Aycelin de Montaigut, and nephew of Gilles I Aycelin de Montaigu, "the Elder", he was bishop of Lavaur (1357-1360) and then bishop of Thérouanne (1356–1361), bishop of Frascati (Tusculum) (1368-1378) and cardinal-priest with the title of SS. Silvestro e Martino (1361-1368).

He attended in 1356 the disastrous Battle of Poitiers and followed King John II of France, "the Good", in England with the title of chancellor. In May 1358 he was sent to London by King John II to lead the council of his son, John, Duke of Berry, "the Magnificent", Count of Poitiers. On 24 June 1360 he went Carcassonne to the marriage of Count of Poitiers with Jeanne, daughter of John I, Count of Armagnac, dead in 1388. John II, "the Good", obtained for him the cardinalate from Pope Innocent VI in 1361.

He was then appointed by Pope Urban V as being one of the Commissioners to reform of the University of Paris. Pope Gregory XI commissioned him as an arbitrator in the dispute between Peter IV of Aragon and the Duke Louis I, Duke of Anjou to the Kingdom of Majorca.

== See also ==
- San Martino ai Monti
