= Niccolò Capocci =

Italian cardinal

- Cardinal-Bishop of Frascati
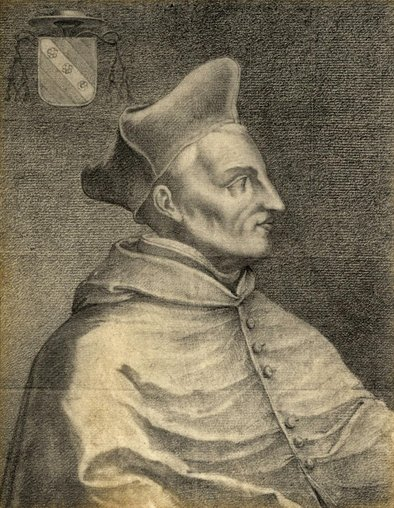
- Church: Catholic Church
- Diocese: Suburbicarian Diocese of Frascati
- In office: 1361 – 26 July 1368
- Predecessor: Guillaume Court
- Successor: Gilles Aycelin de Montaigu
- Previous posts: Cardinal-Priest of San Vitale (1350-1361); Bishop of Urgell (1348-1350); Bishop of Utrecht (1341-1342)

Orders
- Created cardinal: December 17, 1350 by Pope Clement VI

Personal details
- Born: Rome, Papal States
- Died: July 26, 1368 Montefiascone, Papal States

Niccolò Capocci (died 1368) was an Italian Cardinal.

He studied law at the University of Perugia; later, in 1362, he founded there the Collegium Gregorianum (later called the Sapienza vecchia).

He was proposed as bishop of Utrecht in 1341, but the appointment in a situation of conflict lasted only a year. He was in Catalonia as bishop of Urgell, 1348–1351.

He acted as papal legate in France, attempting to broker a peace with the English. In 1356 he was there with Hélie de Talleyrand-Périgord, just ahead of the battle of Poitiers. He quarreled with Talleyrand, later that year, and operated independently from Paris. He was in England in June 1357, back again with Talleyrand. By mid-1358 the legates and Pope Innocent VI had despaired of an effective treaty: the complete failure of the longest papal peacemaking mission of the fourteenth century.
