= Guillaume de Farges =

French cleric

Raymond Guillaume de Farges (or Fargues or Fargis) (Fargues, Gironde, unknown date - Toulouse, 5 October 1346) was a 14th-century French priest and Cardinal. A nephew of Pope Clement V, he was Archdeacon of Leicester from 1310 until his death in 1346.

== Biography ==
Raymond Guilhem de Fargues was the son of Bérenger Guillaume de Fargues (Fargis) and Assalide (alias Jeanne, Marquèze) de Got, a sister of Pope Clement V. He was also a cousin of Cardinal Raymond de Got.

In 1308, he became canon and treasurer of the Beauvais Cathedral. From 29 August 1308, he was a canon in Lincoln at the prebend of Ketton, succeeding his brother Bernard de Fargues, who had become Bishop of Agen On 13 October 1310, he was invested with the Archdeaconry of Leicester in the church of Lincoln. He was also Dean of Salisbury (1311–1346), Archdeacon of Sarum from 1312, and Canon of Bayeux (around 1313) and Mende in the Gévaudan.

He was created a cardinal by Pope Clement V in the consistory of 19 December 1310, although he had only minor orders, and received the titular church of Santa Francesca Romana as Cardinal deacon. Cardinal de Fargues participated in the conclaves of 1314–1316 (election of John XXII), 1334 (election of Benedict XII), and 1342 (election of Clement VI), the latter of whom he crowned as Cardinal Protodeacon.

In Avignon, the Cardinal resided in the Livrée de Florence on the northern part of today's Place Pie.

== See also ==
- Diocese of Lincoln
- Diocese of Peterborough
- Diocese of Leicester
- Archdeacon of Leicester
