= Conclave capitulation =

Historical contracts attaching conditions to the election of a pope

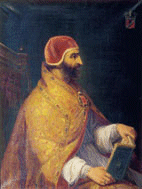
Innocent VI, the first Pope to agree to a capitulation, and the first to disregard one

A conclave capitulation was a compact or unilateral contract drawn up by the College of Cardinals during a papal conclave to constrain the actions of the pope elected by the conclave. The legal term capitulation more frequently refers to the commitment of a sovereign state to relinquish jurisdiction within its borders over the subjects of a foreign state. Before balloting began, all cardinals present at the conclave would swear to be bound by its provisions if elected pope. Capitulations were used by the College of Cardinals to assert its collective authority and limit papal supremacy, to "make the Church an oligarchy instead of a monarchy." Similar electoral capitulations were used on occasion from the 14th to the 17th centuries in Northern and Central Europe to constrain an elected king, emperor, prince, or bishop.

== History ==
The College had made informal attempts to influence the actions of popes before drafting formal capitulations. The first capitulation was drafted in the conclave of 1352, which elected Pope Innocent VI, and most conclaves for the next 300 years produced similar documents.

In 1353, Innocent VI declared these first Capitulations invalid with his Apostolic Constitution, Sollicitudo, citing a Constitution of Pope Gregory X, Contingit, which prohibited papal conclaves from dealing with issues other than the election of a Pope. This papal response would be repeated for most future Capitulations, which were generally disregarded. For this reason, papal historian Frederic Baumgartner calls capitulations "an exercise in futility." Another papal historian, Van Dyke, surmises that by the election of Pope Sixtus IV (1471), "all the Popes for forty years had signed and promptly broken" the "Capitulation of the Conclave." Jugie considers the "regular recourse to capitulation" to be "above all, an admission of weakness." Despite their ineffectiveness, Capitulations still give an insight into the thinking of the Cardinals as they prepared to vote for a pope.

Although not the last Capitulations, that of the conclave of 1513 (which elected Pope Leo X) was a turning point for papal supremacy and attempts to control it through formal treaties; never again did the College attempt to limit its size through capitulations; although individual cardinals remained powerful, the College as a whole never regained its power as the "senate" of the Church.

In 1676, Pope-elect Innocent XI made the College swear to the capitulation that had been drafted by the previous conclave before accepting his election.

Though the practice was defunct, Pope John Paul II's 1996 Constitution Universi Dominici Gregis banned conclave capitulations as well as the papal veto, which had already been eliminated by Pius X. He wrote: "I likewise forbid the Cardinals before the election to enter into any stipulations, committing themselves of common accord to a certain course of action should one of them be elevated to the Pontificate. These promises too, should any in fact be made, even under oath, I also declare null and void."

== List of conclave capitulations ==
Conclave year	Pope elected	Terms	Notes
1352	Innocent VI	College of Cardinals limited to 20; no new cardinals until only 16 remained Two-thirds of College needed to approve creating, excommunicating, depriving of suffrage, or reducing the property or revenue of cardinals, or to request subsidies from sovereigns or national clergies College granted veto power of papal decisions and policies All papal revenue shared with College	First conclave capitulation Declared invalid by Innocent VI in 1353
1431	Eugene IV	Half of papal revenue was to be shared with the College of Cardinals; No major issues were to be decided without the consent of the College	Eugene IV issues a bull to put the capitulation into effect, but later withdrew it Attempted to undo the reforms of Pope Martin V, which had deprived the College of control of church revenues
1458	Pius II	Welfare for the poorer cardinals; and a crusade against the Ottoman Turks	
1464	Paul II	Continue the crusading war against the Turks; Leave Rome only with the consent of the majority of cardinals; Italy with the consent of all College of Cardinals limited to 24; New Pope limited to one cardinal-nephew Creation of cardinals or advancement of benefices required the consent of the College	Similar to 1431 and 1454 capitulations Most of the three-day conclave was spent drafting the capitulation Cardinal Trevisan did not subscribe Paul II created three cardinal-nephews
1471	Sixtus IV	Continue the crusading war against the Turks	Fewer limitations on papal power Frontrunner Cardinal Basilios Bessarion fell out of favor by rejecting the capitulation
1484	Innocent VIII	Cardinals protected from retaliation by secular rulers in connection with the conclave New Pope limited to one cardinal-nephew College of Cardinals limited to 24	
1492	Alexander VI	Limits on the creation of new cardinals	No other terms known
August–September 1503	Pius III	Papal stipend of 2,400 ducats a year for cardinals with annual income less than 6,000 ducats General council was to be held within two years, and every five years thereafter	College of Cardinals not limited to 24
October 1503	Julius II	General council to be held within two years Cardinals to be consulted on creation of new cardinals and other matters Agreement of a supermajority of cardinals for the pope to declare war	Shortest conclave
1513	Leo X	College of Cardinals limited to 24; Continue the crusading war against the Turks without taxing cardinals Reformation of the Roman Curia along the unfinished terms of Julius II; Roman Curia was not to leave Rome; Two-thirds of College required to close the Lateran Council, to impeach or nominate a cardinal, nominate a legate a latere, to confer certain ecclesiastical offices (Julius II had excommunicated four cardinals); Laity mostly excluded from governing of Papal States; Secret articles conferred benefits on cardinals: 200 ducat monthly allowance to a cardinal with annual income less than 6000; Cardinals could not be appointed legate without their consent Benefices of St. Peter and St. John the Lateran could only be conferred on Roman citizens	Imperial Ambassador considered the capitulation unlikely to be followed as it would make the cardinal elected only "half a Pope"; Slightly unreliable copy found in diary of Paris de Grassis; Leo X's violation of the capitulation marked the end of attempts to limit the size of the College or authority of Popes through capitulations; College was transformed from a "senate" to a group of advisers
1522	Adrian VI	Unknown	Called "an exercise in futility as always" by Baumgartner
1549-1550	Julius III	Similar to that of 1513	Ippolito II d'Este delayed negotiations on the capitulation for three days in an attempt to buy time for more French cardinals to reach the conclave Drafted by six cardinals elected from the College
1559	Pius IV	Pope prohibited from waging war on a Catholic prince (as Pope Paul IV had done with Spain); Lateran Council was to be reconvened	
1585	Sixtus V	Continue the crusading war against the Turks, make peace with Catholic monarchs, complete the construction of St. Peters (which had been ongoing for seven decades)	Little mention of privileges or number of cardinals
September 1590	Urban VII	None known	
1669-1670	Clement X	Reform of the clergy, independence from secular rulers, restoration of advisory role of cardinals	
1676	Innocent XI	Same as that of 1670	Unique in that Pope-elect made cardinals swear to the previous capitulation before accepting his election
