= Collège d'Autun =

College of the University of Paris

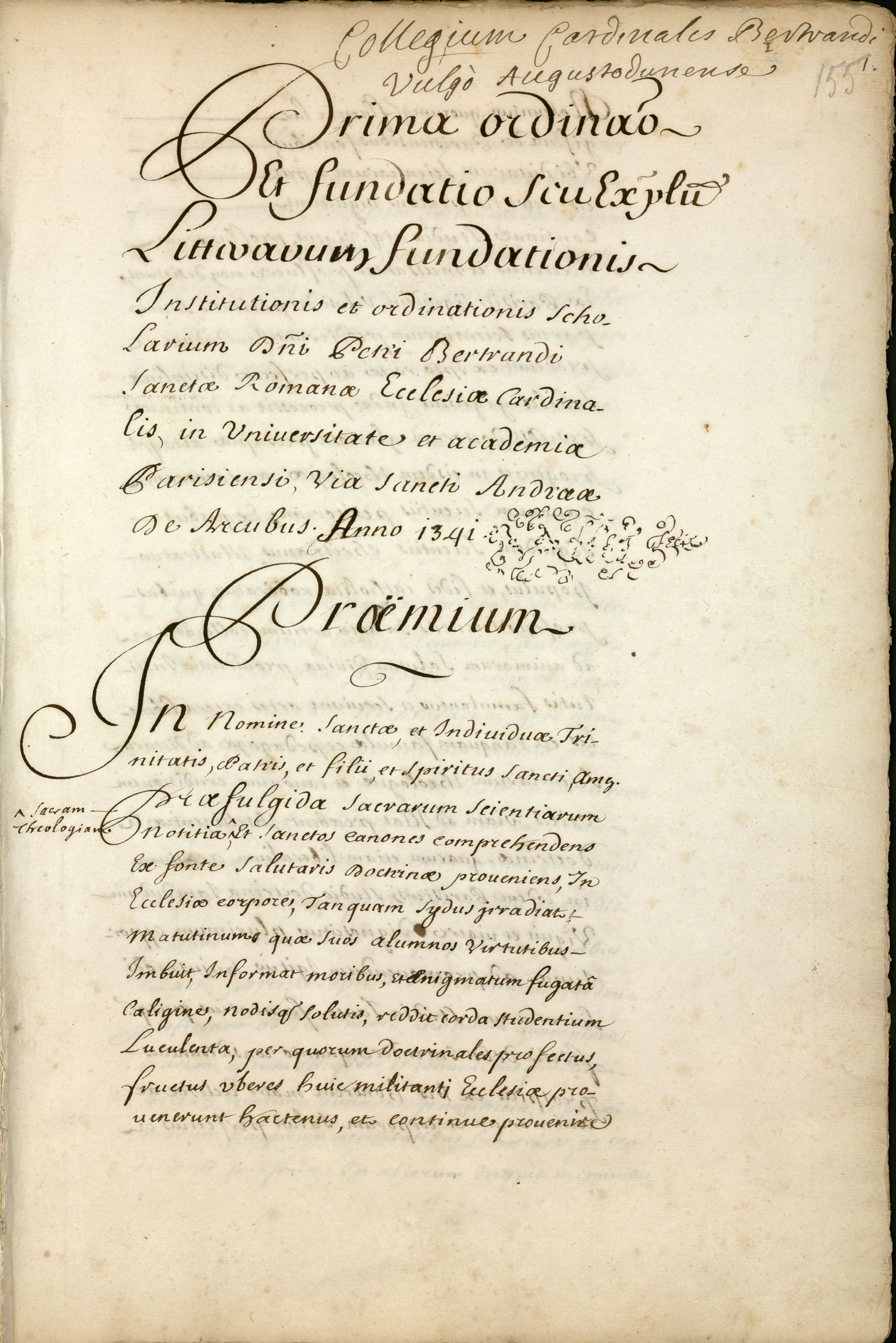
Collège d'Autun or Cardinal Bertrand: foundation and statutes. Latin manuscript, 17th century (Bibliothèque de la Sorbonne, NuBIS)

Collège d'Autun (or d'Annonay or du Cardinal Bertrand) was a college of the former University of Paris. It was founded by Pierre Bertrand in 1337.

Its premises were located in rue Saint-André-des-Arts in the 6th arrondissement of Paris. The collège was home to 15 students, who studied theology, law or philosophy.

Along with other Parisian colleges, the collège d'Autun merged with the collège Louis-le-Grand in 1764. It then formally disappeared, and its premises were later on demolished.

== Famous alumni ==
- Louis Renault - Nobel Peace Prize 1907
