= Bernard d'Albi =

French cardinal

Cardinal Bernard d'Albi
- Cardinal-Bishop
- Church: S. Cyriaco in Thermis (1338-1349)
- Diocese: Rodez (1336-1338); Porto (1349-1350)

Orders
- Created cardinal: 18 December 1338 by Pope Benedict XII

Personal details
- Born: Saverdun, Pamiers, France
- Died: 26 May 1350 Avignon, France
- Occupation: Courtier, diplomat
- Profession: Catholic prelate

Bernard d'Albi was a French cardinal of the 14th century. He was born at Saverdun in the diocese of Pamiers in the foothills of the Pyrenees, south of Toulouse and died on 23 November 1350 at Avignon.

== Biography ==
Bernard d'Albi held a licenciate in Canon Law, and was a papal Chaplain. He was Dean of the Cathedral of Beauvais when he was appointed Bishop of Rodez on 31 January 1336 by Pope Benedict XII.

Benedict (Jacques Fournier) had been Bishop of Pamiers (1317–1327) before his appointment as a cardinal. He made his formal entry into Rodez on 15 August 1336. Bernard held the episcopal seat until he was promoted to the cardinalate in 1338. By a statute which he issued on 26 October 1336, Bishop Bernard reserved half of the fruits of the vacant benefices in the diocese which were in his gift, "...because of the extreme necessity and poverty of the fabric of the Church of Rodez."

In other words, the cathedral was in serious need of repair, and the only source of funds was the Bishop's treasury, where he collected the income from vacant benefices. Bishop Bernard's successor was appointed on 27 January 1339. While Bishop of Rodez, Bernard received the dedication of Raimundus Acgerii's Commentary on Aristotle's Politics. Pierre de Corveheda also dedicated a work to the Bishop of Rodez, his commentary on Aristotle's Nicomachean Ethics.

In 1337, Pope Benedict appointed him Apostolic Nuncio to Aragon, Castile and Portugal, with the mission of ending the hostility between King Alfonso XI of Castile and King Afonso IV of Portugal. His written instructions are dated 16 June 1337.

On 18 December 1338, Pope Benedict XII held a Consistory for the creation of cardinals. Bernard d'Albi was one of the seven prelates created cardinals. He was not present in Avignon, and therefore the Pope wrote him a letter on 19 December, informing him of his promotion. He was still in Spain, and did not return to Avignon until 2 August 1339. He was appointed Cardinal-Priest of S. Cyriaco in Thermis (1338–1349).

On 16 February 1339, the new Cardinal Bernard was granted as a benefice the Priory of Sorzac in Poitiers. On the same day he was also granted the Benedictine Priory of Donchereio (Donchery, in the Ardennes) in the diocese of Reims, a dependency of S. Medard in Soissons. He was also named Provost of the Benedictine abbey of Faveriis in the diocese of Soissons. He was appointed Archdeacon Major of the church of Tarragona, governed by the Rule of S. Augustine. Finally, he was appointed Canon, Prebendary, and Archdeacon of the church of Saintes. In each case he was granted a dispensation because he was being granted multiple benefices in Saintes, Reims, Soissons, and Tarragona. The income from these benefices was intended to support the lifestyle of a cardinal at the Papal Court; the work of the various offices was performed by delegates and agents.

Cardinal Bernard d'Albi, often called the Cardinal of Rodez, participated in the Conclave of 1342. The Conclave began on Sunday, 5 May 1342, and concluded on Tuesday 7 May, with the election of Pierre Roger, who was crowned on Pentecost Sunday, 19 May 1342. under the name Pope Clement VI.

In 1343, Cardinal Bernard d'Albi was sent to Spain again, to deal with the war that had broken out between James III of Majorca and his cousin Peter IV of Aragon.

In 1346, Pope Clement VI was involved in a dispute with Archbishop Heinrich von Virneburg, Archbishop of Mainz and Imperial Elector, the real reason being Heinrich's support for the candidacy of Ludwig the Bavarian as Emperor, which the Pope opposed. Clement, however, chose to believe that Heinrich was schismatic, and summoned him to appear at the Court of Rome in Avignon. Heinrich, of course, refused, or, in Clement's view 'was contumacious', and therefore Clement handed his case over to Cardinal Bernard d'Albi as Assessor litterarum contradictarum (judge) to conduct the inquiry and determine the facts, though the papal language leaves no doubt that the expected outcome would be 'guilty as charged'. Heinrich was convicted and deposed on 7 April 1346. On 22 April Bernard d'Albi was present, along with eleven other cardinals, at the oath-taking of Charles of Moravia as Emperor.

Cardinal Bernard was a friend of Petrarch, and believed himself to be a poet. Petrarch was only mildly enthusiastic. They exchanged letters. On one occasion Petrarch sent Bernard a manuscript containing Servius' "Commentary on Vergil's Aeneid.

He was promoted to the Order of Cardinal-Bishops on 19 January 1349, succeeding Cardinal Jean-Raymond de Comminges as Bishop of Porto.

He died on 13 November 1350 in Avignon. He was buried in the Chapel of Benedict XII in the Cathedral of S. Marie de Domps.

== Bibliography ==
- Baluze [Baluzius], Etienne [Stephanus] (1693). Vitae paparum Avenionensium, hoc est, Historia pontificum romanorum qui in Gallia sederunt ab anno Christi MCCCV. usque ad annum MCCCXCIV (in Latin). Vol. Tomus primus. Paris: apud Franciscum Muguet. Nouvelle edition by G. Mollat II (Paris 1927).
- Baluze, Etienne (1693). Vitae Paparum Avenionensium, Hoc est Historia Pontificum Romanorum qui in Gallia sederunt ab anno Christi MCCCV usque ad annum MCCCXCIV (in Latin). Vol. Tomus secundus. Paris: Muguet.
- Du Chesne, François (1660). Histoire De Tous Les Cardinaux François De Naissance (in French). Vol. Tome I. Paris: Aux despens de l' Autheur. pp. 465–470.
- Du Chesne, François (1660). Preuves de l' Histoire de tous les cardinaux François de naissance (in French and Latin). Paris: Aux despens de l'Autheur & se vendent chez luy. pp. 311–322.
- Eubel, Konrad (1898). Hierarchia catholica medii aevi: sive Summorum pontificum, S.R.E. cardinalium, ecclesiarum antistitum series ab anno 1198 usque ad annum [1605] perducta e documentis tabularii praesertim Vaticani collecta, digesta (in Latin). Vol. I. Münster: sumptibus et typis librariae Regensbergianae. (second edition 1913).
- Lützelschwab, Ralf (2007). Flectat cardinales ad velle suum? Clemens VI. und sein Kardinalskolleg: Ein Beitrag zur kurialen Politik in der Mitte des 14. Jahrhunderts (in German). Berlin: De Gruyter. pp. 471–472. ISBN 978-3-486-84130-5.
- Renouard, Yves (1970). The Avignon papacy, 1305-1403. Hamden CT USA: Archon Books. ISBN 978-0-208-01156-5.
- Rollo-Koster, Joëlle (2015). Avignon and Its Papacy, 1309–1417: Popes, Institutions, and Society. New York-London: Rowman & Littlefield Publishers. ISBN 978-1-4422-1534-4.
- Vaquette d' Hermilly (1777). Histoire du royaume de Majorque avec ses annexes,: pour servir à l'Histoire de France, & à celle d'Espagne de Dom Jean de Ferreras (in French). Maestricht: chez Jean-Edme Dufour & Philippe Roux.
