= Montpezat-de-Quercy =

- Commune
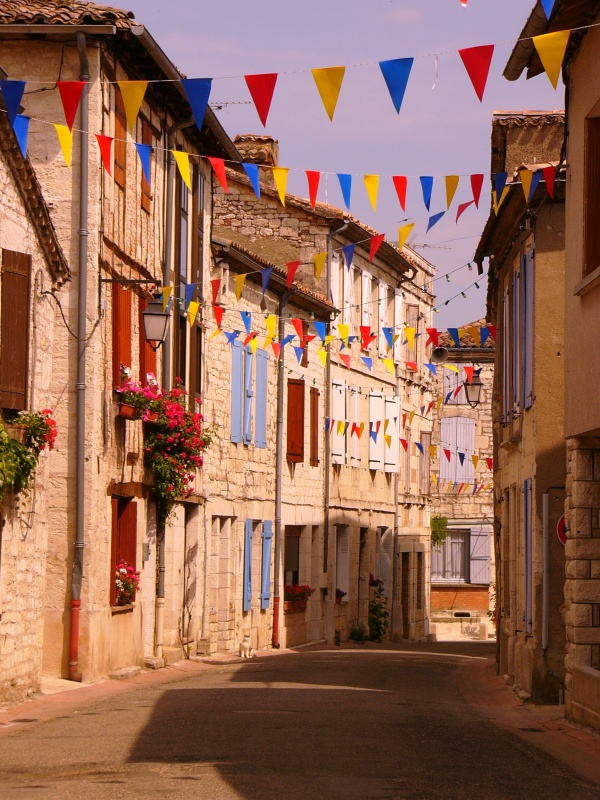
- The street behind the town gate, in Montpezat-de-Quercy

- Coat of arms
- Location of Montpezat-de-Quercy
- Location within France Location within Occitanie
- Coordinates: 44°14′21″N 1°28′38″E
- Country: France
- Region: Occitania
- Department: Tarn-et-Garonne
- Arrondissement: Montauban
- Canton: Quercy-Aveyron
- Intercommunality: Quercy caussadais

Government
  - Mayor (2020–2026): Gérard Mounie
- Area^{1}: 44.02 km^{2} (17.00 sq mi)
- Elevation: 275 m (902 ft)
- Highest elevation: 309 m (1,014 ft)
- Lowest elevation: 126 m (413 ft)
- Population (2023): 1,590
  - Density: 36.1/km^{2} (93.6/sq mi)
- Time zone: UTC+01:00 (CET)
  - Summer (DST): UTC+02:00 (CEST)
- INSEE/Postal code: 82131 /82270
- ^{1} French Land Register data, which excludes lakes, ponds, glaciers > 1 km^{2} (0.386 sq mi or 247 acres) and river estuaries.

Montpezat-de-Quercy (French pronunciation: [mɔ̃pəza də kɛʁsi], literally Montpezat of Quercy; Occitan: Montpesat de Carcin) is a commune in the Tarn-et-Garonne département in the Occitanie région in southern France.

Montpezat-de-Quercy is situated 35 km (22 mi) north of Montauban. The commune has been listed as a protected town, mainly thanks to its 14th-century church, which contains tapestries from the sixteenth century relating the life of St Martin.

== Demographics ==
Historical population
Year	Pop.	±% p.a.
1968	1,448	—
1975	1,419	−0.29%
1982	1,407	−0.12%
1990	1,411	+0.04%
1999	1,378	−0.26%
2007	1,424	+0.41%
2012	1,494	+0.96%
2017	1,567	+0.96%
2023	1,590	+0.24%
Source: INSEE

== See also ==
- Communes of the Tarn-et-Garonne department
