= Gaillard de la Mothe =

Cardinal Gaillard de La Mothe
- Cardinal-Deacon
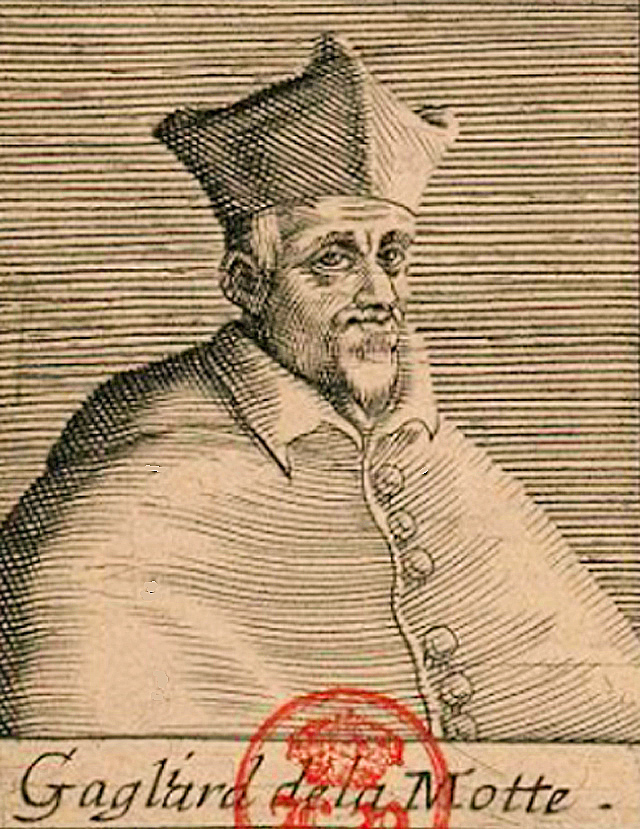
- Church: Santa Lucia in Silice (1316-1356)

Orders
- Created cardinal: 18 December 1316 by Pope John XXII

Personal details
- Died: 20 December 1356 Avignon, FR
- Buried: Bazas, Church of S. Jean
- Parents: Amanieu de La Motte; Elips (Alix) de Got
- Occupation: cleric
- Coat of arms

Gaillard de La Mothe (also spelled de La Motte, de LaMotte, della Motta) was a fourteenth-century prelate and Cardinal, of Gascon extraction. Gaillard was born towards the end of the 13th century, either in Toulouse or Bordeaux, and died in Avignon on 20 December 1356. He was the son of Amanieu Levieux de La Motte, seigneur of Roquetaillade. His mother was Elips (Alix) de Got, daughter of Arnaud-Garsale de Got, brother of Bertrand de Got. He was therefore a nephew of Pope Clement V (Bertrand de Got). Gaillard had a brother, Bertrand. Another uncle, his father's brother, Guillaume de la Mothe, was Bishop of Bazas from 1303-1313, when he was transferred to Saintes, and again from 1318 to 1319.

== Early career ==
Pope Clement V (1305-1314) had secularized the monastery of S. Emilion, and converted it into a Collegiate Church with canons. The first Dean of the Canons of S. Emilion was Gaillard de La Mothe.

By 1313 he was Protonotary Apostolic and Archdeacon of Narbonne, thanks to his uncle's patronage. On 20 May 1313 Pope Clement reserved for his nephew a prebend in the Church of Compostella in Spain. On 23 June he made him Canon and Prebend of the Church of Rouen. On 17 August 1313 the Pope granted Gaillard the privilege of visiting his Archdeaconry of Oxford in the Church of Lincoln by proxy, for a period of three years. On 23 October he was granted the same privilege with respect to his Archdeaconry of Grand-Caux in the Church of Rouen. These positions were granted for the sake of the income. There was no expectation that the recipient would ever appear personally, and in the case of the English benefices, Gaillard did not. He appointed procurators in England to act as his legal agents.

== Cardinal ==
He was named a cardinal by Pope John XXII in his first Consistory for the creation of cardinals on 18 December 1316. He was named Deacon of Santa Lucia in Silice.

Cardinal de la Mothe took part in the Conclave of 13–20 December 1334, following the death of Pope John. Twenty-four cardinals participated, two-thirds of them French, five from Cahors. The cardinals chose the Cistercian Cardinal Jacques Fournier, from the town of Savardun near Toulouse, in the Diocese of Pamiers. He took the throne name of Benedict XII.

In 1336, Gaillard de La Mothe was one of five cardinals, and numerous other prelates and lay persons, who were appointed to revise the Statutes of the Order of Friars Minor (Franciscans).

Cardinal Gaillard de La Mothe also took part in the Conclave of 5–7 May 1342, following the death of Pope Benedict XII (Jacques Fournier). Eighteen of the nineteen cardinals took part in the election, which took place in the Apostolic Palace in Avignon. The Cardinals elected Cardinal Pierre Roger of Limoges. Pope Clement VI was crowned at the Church of the Convent of the Dominicans in Avignon, on Pentecost Sunday, 19 May 1342, by Cardinal Raymond Guillaume de Fargues, the Protodeacon. Among the witnesses were John Duke of Normandy, the eldest son of the King, Jacques Duke of Bourbon, Philip Duke of Burgundy, and Imbert Dauphin of Vienne.

== English benefices and French hostility ==
On 21 June 1339, Pope Benedict XII wrote to the Archbishop of Canterbury, the Bishop of Winchester, and the Bishop of Paris, issuing a mandate for them to protect Cardinal Gaillard de La Mothe against those who molest him, touching his benefices and possessions in their dioceses. This indicates that, in addition to the benefices already noted, Gaillard also had benefices in Canterbury, Winchester and Paris.

On 20 February 1345, Cardinal de La Mothe still held in England the benefices of: Archdeacon of Oxford, Archdeacon of Ely, Precentor of Chichester (by 1321), and Prebend of Milton in the Church of Lincoln. The possession of such a number of English benefices should cause no surprise. Gascony and Guyenne belonged to the English crown, and both the de Gots and the de la Mothes owed allegiance to the King of England.

In the summer of 1346 Cardinal de La Mothe found himself in serious trouble. Two of his familiares hid themselves near the Cardinal's presence, and claimed to have overheard the Cardinal make remarks which were injurious to the King and Queen of France. They caused the alleged remarks to be circulated among the subjects of the French King. King Philip VI wrote to the Pope, who ordered an investigation in which subjects of the King were examined. The solemn investigation found that the remarks had been invented, and Cardinal de La Mothe was cleared. When they were released, the familiars headed immediately for the French Court. The Pope, therefore, had to write a letter to the King, fully explaining what he had done to seek the truth, explaining that the whole set of remarks had been invented, and that Cardinal de La Mothe had been exonerated. In that same summer, Prince John of France was campaigning against the English in Languedoc and Gascony, and he happened to attack a castle belonging to the nephew of Cardinal de La Mothe.

In 1348, Cardinal de La Mothe and two other cardinals were assigned to be Relatores (discussion leaders) when the portion of the process for the Canonization of St. Yvo Helori which included his claimed miracles was discussed and voted on. Their efforts were successful.

De La Mothe took part in the Conclave of 1352, following the death of Clement VI on 6 December 1352. The Conclave opened on Sunday 16 December, in the Apostolic Palace in Avignon, with twenty-six cardinals in attendance. It ended on the morning of Tuesday 18 December, with the election of Innocent VI (Étienne Aubert, the Bishop of Ostia). He was crowned in the Apostolic Palace at Avignon on Sunday 30 December by Cardinal Gaillard de la Mothe, the Protodeacon.

On 5 February 1355 Cardinal de La Mothe was present in Consistory along with Pope Innocent VI and twenty other cardinals to discuss the petition submitted by Pierre Bertrand de Colombiers, Bishop of Ostia, to be granted the pallium before he set off for Rome to preside at the Coronation of the Emperor Charles IV. Next day, the Pope, having consulted the cardinals as a group and individually, issued his decree granting the pallium and assigning Cardinal Gaillard and Cardinal Bernard de Torre of S. Eustachio to present it according to the accepted ritual.

Cardinal Gaillard de La Mothe died on 20 December 1356, and was buried at Bazas in the Church of Saint Jean, where he was building a magnificent monument for his uncle Pope Clement V. The church was devastated by the Huguenots in 1577.

Of Cardinal de La Mothe Jean Roy remarked, "... it is true that this prelate did not have all the talents necessary to administer advantageously the affairs of the Church and of the Holy See...."

== See also ==
- Gaillard de Preyssac, his mother's first cousin.

== Bibliography ==
- Baluze [Baluzius], Etienne [Stephanus] (1693). Vitae paparum Avenionensium, hoc est, Historia pontificum romanorum qui in Gallia sederunt ab anno Christi MCCCV. usque ad annum MCCCXCIV (in Latin). Vol. Tomus primus. Paris: apud Franciscum Muguet.
- Baluze, Etienne (1693). Vitae Paparum Avenionensium, Hoc est Historia Pontificum Romanorum qui in Gallia sederunt ab anno Christi MCCCV usque ad annum MCCCXCIV (in Latin). Vol. Tomus secundus. Paris: Muguet.
- Baronio, Cesare (1872). Augustinus Theiner (ed.). Annales ecclesiastici: A. D. 1-1571 denuo excusi et ad nostra usque tempora perducti ab Augustino Theiner (in Latin). Vol. Tomus vigesimus quintus (25). Barri-Ducis: Typis et sumptibus Ludovici Guerin.
- Eubel, Konrad (1898). Hierarchia catholica medii aevi: sive Summorum pontificum, S.R.E. cardinalium, ecclesiarum antistitum series ab anno 1198 usque ad annum [1605] perducta e documentis tabularii praesertim Vaticani collecta, digesta (in Latin). Vol. I. Münster: sumptibus et typis librariae Regensbergianae.
- Le Neve (1854). Hardy, Thomas Duffus (ed.). Fasti Ecclesiae Anglicanae: or a calendar of the principal ecclesiast. dignitaries in England and Wales, and of the chief officers in the univ. of Oxford and Cambridge, from the earliest time to the year 1760 : in 3 vol. Vol. II. Oxford: University Press.
- Martin, Jean-Baptiste (1905). Conciles et bullaire du diocèse de Lyon: des origines à la réunion du Lyonnais à la France en 1312 (in French and Latin). Lyon: Emmanuel Vitte. p. 687.
- Roy, Jean (1788). Nouvelle histoire des cardinaux françois (in French). Vol. Tome huitieme. Paris: Poincot. [containing a biography of Cardinal de La Motte]
