= Annibaldo Caetani =

Italian Cardinal

Annibaldo Caetani di Ceccano
- Cardinal-Bishop of Frascati
- Church: Catholic Church
- Diocese: Suburbicarian Diocese of Frascati
- In office: 1333 – 17 July 1350
- Predecessor: Bertrand de La Tour
- Successor: Guillaume Court
- Other post: Archpriest of St. Peter's Basilica (1342-1350)
- Previous posts: Cardinal-Priest of San Lorenzo in Damaso (1327-1333); Archbishop of Naples (1326-1327)

Orders
- Created cardinal: 18 December 1327 by Pope John XXII

Personal details
- Born: 1282 Ceccano, Campagna e Marittima Province, Papal States
- Died: 17 July 1350 (aged 67–68) San Germano, Terra di Lavoro, Kingdom of Naples

Annibaldo Caetani di Ceccano (c. 1282 – 1350) was an Italian Cardinal. His palace, the Livrée Ceccano at Avignon, begun in about 1335/1340, still survives; it is now a public library.

He was Archbishop of Naples from 1326 to 1328 and undertook diplomatic missions, for example setting up the 1343 truce between England and France. He was Bishop of Frascati from 1332 to 1350. He was archpriest of Saint Peter's Basilica (1342-1350), as well as Archdeacon of Cornwall from 1342 to 1344, and Archdeacon of Nottingham from 1331 to 1348.

He is celebrated for the luxury of a feast he gave in 1343 for Pope Clement VI, an eye-witness account of which has survived.
