= Guillaume Court =

French Cistercian theologian and Cardinal

Guillaume Court OCist
- Cardinal-Bishop of Frascati
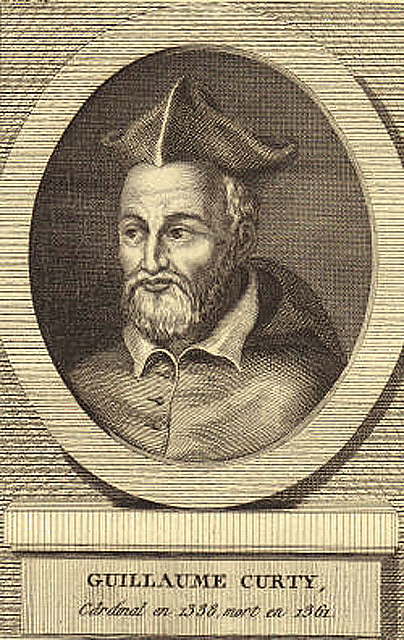
- Native name: Guillaume de Court Novel
- Church: Catholic Church
- Diocese: Suburbicarian Diocese of Frascati
- In office: 18 December 1350 – 12 June 1361
- Predecessor: Annibaldo Caetani
- Successor: Niccolò Capocci
- Previous posts: Cardinal-Priest of Santi Quattro Coronati (1338-1350); Bishop of Albi (1337-1338); Bishop of Nîmes (1337)

Orders
- Created cardinal: 18 December 1338 by Pope Benedict XII

Personal details
- Born: Belpech, Languedoc, Kingdom of France
- Died: 12 June 1361 Avignon, Comtat Venaissin, Papal States

Guillaume Court (died 1361) was a French Cistercian theologian and Cardinal.

He was briefly bishop of Nîmes, and then bishop of Albi, in 1337, but only for a year, as Pope Benedict XII shortly elevated him to the cardinalate. He was the nephew of Benedict, who as Jacques Fournier had been a bishop of Mirepoix active in hunting heresy in south-west France; and in any case was a countryman and supporter in these activities.

Subsequently he investigated several cases of Franciscan spirituals under suspicion. The major work Liber secretorum eventuum of Joannes de Rupescissa was written to his order. In decisions of an Avignon theological tribune he headed in 1354, Joannes de Rupescissa was cleared; John of Castillon and Francis of Arquata were condemned and burned.
