= Pierre Bertrand de Colombier =

French cardinal

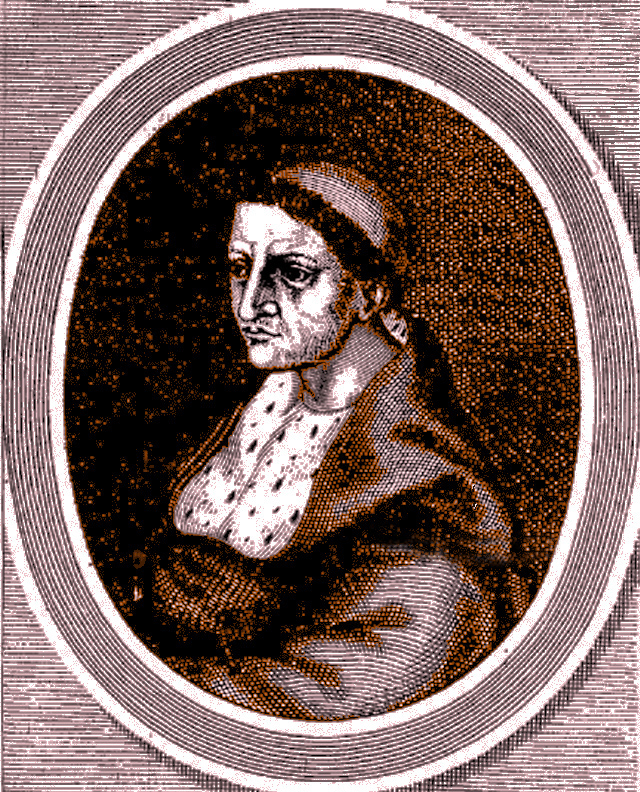
Pierre Bertrand de Colombier

Pierre Bertrand de Colombier (1299–1361), French cardinal and diplomat, was born at Colombier in Ardèche.

He was nephew and namesake of Cardinal Pierre Bertrand of Annonay. After a careful juristic education he was successively advocate at the parlement of Paris, intendant of the council of the count of Nevers (1321), and counsellor-clerk to the parlement (1329).

Having taken holy orders, he became dean of St Quentin in 1330, and was employed to negotiate the marriage of the duke of Normandy, the future king John the Good of France, with the daughter of the king of Bohemia. In 1335 he became bishop of Nevers, in 1339 bishop of Arras, and contributed to bring the county of Flanders into the kingdom of France.

Created cardinal priest of St Susanna in 1344, he was employed by the pope on important missions, notably to negotiate peace or an armistice between France and England. Having become bishop of Ostia in 1353, he was sent next year to Charles IV of Germany, and induced him to come to Italy to be crowned emperor at Rome, 1355. In 1356 he went to France to try to arrange a peace with England, and died in 1361 at the priory of Montaud near Avignon.

== Sources ==
- Mazon, A., Essai historique sur l'état du Vivarais pendant la guerre de cent ans (Paris, 1889)
- Catholic Encyclopedia article on Pierre Bertrand and his uncle
- Miranda, Salvador. "BERTRAND, iuniore, Pierre (1299-1361)". The Cardinals of the Holy Roman Church. Florida International University. OCLC 53276621.

Catholic Church titles
Preceded by Étienne Aubert	Cardinal-bishop of Ostia; 1353–1361	Succeeded by Andouin Aubert
