= Pierre Bertrand (cardinal) =

French cardinal

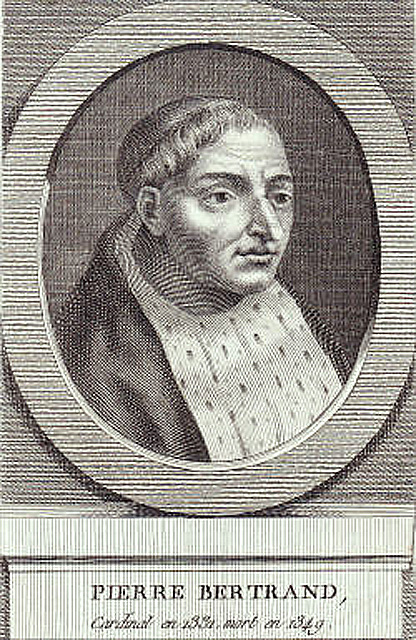
Pierre Bertrand

Pierre Bertrand (1280 – 1348 or 1349) was a French Cardinal, theologian, and canonist.

== Life ==
Pierre Bertrand was born at Annonay in Vivarais. His noble parentage is known to us through the manuscript memoir of Grasset, a Celestine monk of the seventeenth century (Discours généalogique de la noble maison de Bertrand et de leur alliance avec celle de Colombier). The legal profession seems to have been the first aim of his education. He successively studied and taught law in the Universities of Avignon, Montpellier, Orléans, and Paris.

A highly competent lawyer, he soon reached high positions in the Parlement of Paris, the King's Council, and the Queen's Chancery. His interests lay, however, in another direction, and he became a priest.

His priestly career was as successful as his legal success. In rapid succession he was Dean of Puy-en-Valais, Bishop of Nevers, and Bishop of Autun. In 1331 Pope John XXII made him a cardinal. Among his services were several charitable institutions founded at Annonay, and the Collège d'Autun, or Collège Cardinal, established in Paris on behalf of fifteen poor students, five for theology, five for law, and five for the fine arts.

Bertrand defended the rights of the Church both by word of mouth and with his pen. Fournier, in his "Officialitiés du moyen-âge" (Paris, 1880), points out, at the beginning of the Valois dynasty, a strong tendency of the State towards curtailing the Church's traditional rights. In 1329 took place the famous Conférence de Vincennes, where Pierre de Cugnieres, speaking for Philippe de Valois, bitterly complained of undue extension of ecclesiastical privileges (e.g., ordaining clerics for the sole purpose of enjoying the privilegium fori; causes des veuves, or widow's causes drawn to ecclesiastical courts; the free use of censures to enforce the Church's privileges; appeals to the Church from the decision of civil courts, etc.).

Pierre Bertrand, then Bishop of Autun, was the principal spokesman of the clergy. He replied in a spirit of conciliation to all charges bearing on minor points, but strongly upheld what he considered the essential rights of the Church. Following on the lines of the Bull Unam Sanctam of Boniface VIII, he summed up his plea in four statements:

1. the secular power is from God;
2. yet, it is not by itself enough for the government of the people, for which spiritual jurisdiction is also required;
3. although nothing prevents the two powers from being in the same hands;
4. still, whether in the same or different hands, they stand in a certain relation of subordination, the spiritual power being the higher of the two.

Bertrand died in 1348 or 1349 at the Priory of Montaud, near Avignon.

== Works ==
His views are to be found in Libellus adversus Petrum de Cugneriis and De origine et usu jurisdictionum published in Paris in 1495 and 1584 respectively, and later inserted in volume XIV of the Magna Bibliotheca Veterum Patrum (Cologne, 1618).

Other writings of Cardinal Bertrand (apologetical, canonical, pastoral) have not been published, and are reported to be in the Vatican Library.
