= Joëlle Rollo-Koster =

Historian

- Awards: Adèle Mellen Prize (2008); Chevalier des Palmes académiques (2016); URI Foundation Scholarly Excellence Award (2018)

Academic background
- Education: University of Nice; SUNY Binghamton

Academic work
- Discipline: History
- Sub-discipline: Medieval History
- Institutions: University of Rhode Island; Swedish Collegium for Advanced Study

Joëlle Rollo-Koster is a French medievalist working as a professor of medieval history at the University of Rhode Island.

== Life ==
Joëlle Rollo-Koster received her undergraduate degree and master's degree in history from the University of Nice, France. She earned a Ph.D. in history at SUNY Binghamton in 1992 where she was a student of Richard Trexler.

On December 6, 2016, she was knighted by the French government with the medal of Chevalier des Palmes académiques. In 2017-2018 she was a EURIAS Fellow at the Swedish Collegium for Advanced Study. In 2024, she was elected a fellow of the Medieval Academy of America.

== Selected publications ==
=== As author ===
- Raiding Saint Peter: Empty Sees, Violence, and the Initiation of the Great Western Schism (1378), 2008, Brill, ISBN 9789047433118
- The People of Curial Avignon: A Critical Edition of the Liber Divisionis and the Matriculae of Notre Dame la Majour, 2009, Edwin Mellen Press, ISBN 077344680X
- Avignon and Its Papacy, 1309–1417: Popes, Institutions, and Society, 2015, Rowman and Littlefield, ISBN 9781442215320
- The Great Western Schism, 1378–1417: Performing Legitimacy, Performing Unity, 2022, CUP, ISBN 9781107168947

=== As editor ===
- Medieval and Early Modern Ritual: Formalized Behavior in Europe, China and Japan, 2002, Brill, ISBN 9789004117495
- (Co-edited, with Thomas M. Izbicki) A Companion to the Great Western Schism (1378-1417), 2009, Brill, ISBN 9789004162778
- (Co-edited, with Kathryn Reyerson) For the Salvation of my Soul: Women and Wills in Medieval and Early Modern France, 2012, Centre for French History and Culture of the University of St Andrews, ISBN 9781907548086
- Death in Medieval Europe: Death Scripted and Death Choreographed, Routledge, 2016, ISBN 9781138802131
- (Co-edited, with Robert A. Ventresca, Melodie H. Eichbauer, and Miles Pattenden) The Cambridge History of the Papacy, volume 1: The Two Swords, 2025, Cambridge UP, ISBN 9781108485234
- (Co-edited, with Robert A. Ventresca, Melodie H. Eichbauer, and Miles Pattenden) The Cambridge History of the Papacy, volume 2: The Governance of the Church, 2025, Cambridge UP, ISBN 9781108493826
- (Co-edited, with Robert A. Ventresca, Melodie H. Eichbauer, and Miles Pattenden) The Cambridge History of the Papacy III: volume 3: Civil Society, 2025, Cambridge UP ISBN 9781108493772

== Recognition ==
- 2008 Adèle Mellen Prize for Distinguished Contribution to Scholarship
- 2016 The medal of Chevalier des Palmes académiques
- 2018 URI: Recipient URI Foundation, Scholarly Excellence Award
