= Pope Innocent VI =

Head of the Catholic Church from 1352 to 1362

- Bishop of Rome
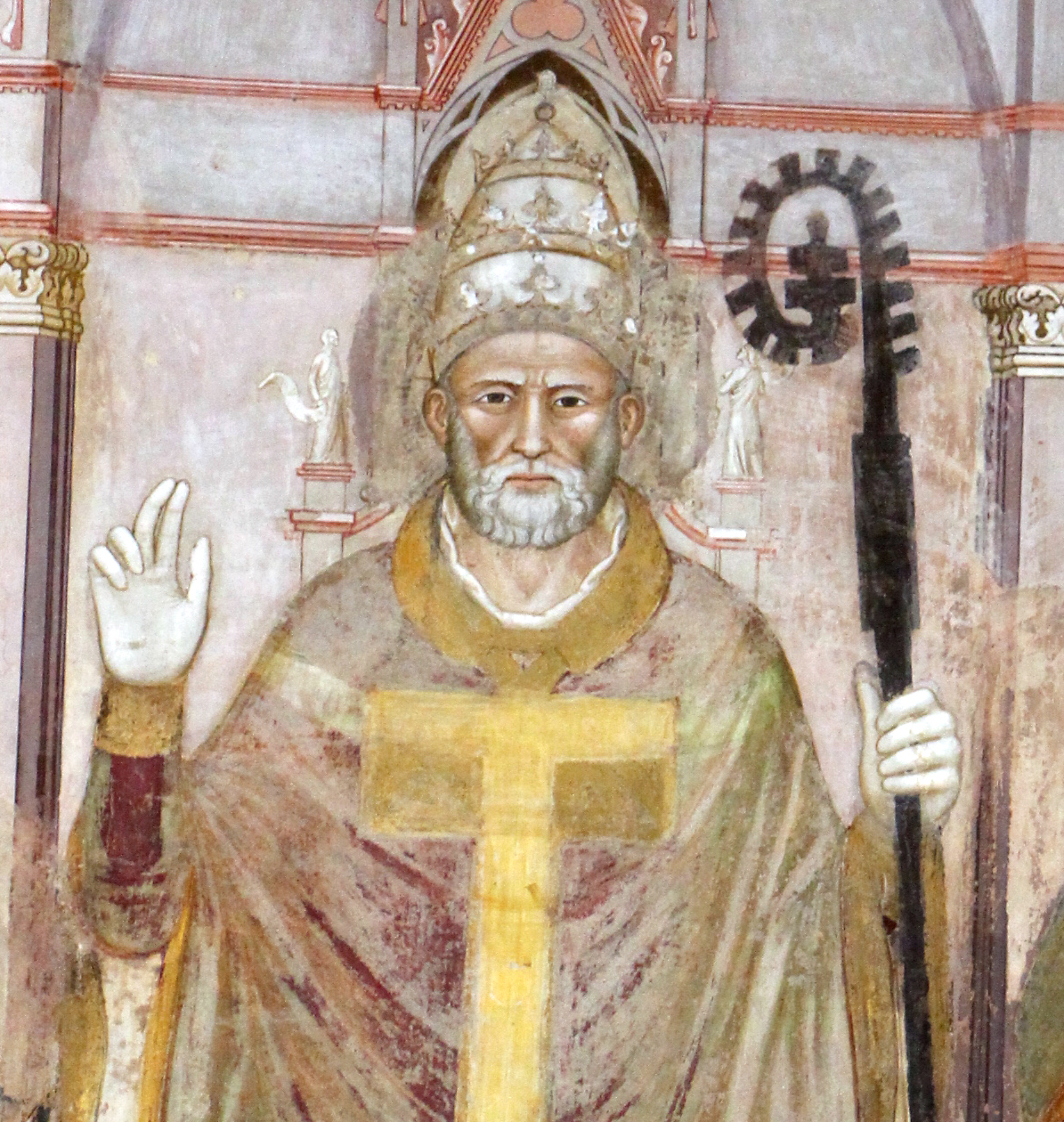
- Fresco portrait by Andrea di Bonaiuto, 1365
- Church: Catholic Church
- Papacy began: 18 December 1352
- Papacy ended: 12 September 1362
- Predecessor: Clement VI
- Successor: Urban V

Orders
- Created cardinal: 20 September 1342 by Clement VI

Personal details
- Born: Étienne Aubert; 1282 Les Monts, Kingdom of France
- Died: 12 September 1362 (aged 79–80) Avignon, Papal States
- Coat of arms

Papal styles of Pope Innocent VI
- Reference style: His Holiness
- Spoken style: Your Holiness
- Religious style: Holy Father
- Posthumous style: None

Pope Innocent VI (Latin: Innocentius VI; 1282 – 12 September 1362), born Étienne Aubert, was head of the Catholic Church and ruler of the Papal States from 18 December 1352 to his death, in September 1362. He was the fifth Avignon pope and the only one with the pontifical name of "Innocent".

Étienne Aubert, born in the Diocese of Limoges, was a civil law professor and held various positions in the church before being appointed as Cardinal-Bishop of Ostia and Velletri by Pope Clement VI. He became Pope Innocent VI on 30 December 1352. As pope, he revoked an agreement asserting the college of cardinals' superiority over the pope and introduced important reforms in church administration. Through his legate, Cardinal Albornoz, he aimed to restore order in Rome.

Innocent VI played a significant role in the 1360 Treaty of Brétigny between France and England. Though he declined an offer to unite the Greek Orthodox Church with the Roman See in exchange for support, his papacy was marked by financial challenges due to wars in Italy and the aftermath of a plague. To address these challenges, he reduced the chapel staff and sold works of art.

Innocent VI was a patron of letters and is generally considered just and merciful, although criticized by some, such as St. Bridget of Sweden, for his actions against the Fraticelli. He died on 12 September 1362 and was succeeded by Urban V. His tomb is located in the Chartreuse du Val de Bénédiction in Villeneuve-lès-Avignon.

== Early life ==
Étienne, born during the late 1280s, was the son of Adhemar Aubert, seigneur de Montel-de-Gelat in Limousin province. He was a native of the hamlet of Les Monts, Diocese of Limoges, and, after having taught civil law at Toulouse, he became successively Bishop of Noyon in 1338 and Bishop of Clermont in 1340. On 20 September 1342, he was raised to the position of Cardinal Priest of SS. John and Paul. In September 1347, Etienne, assigned by Pope Clement VI, accompanied Cardinal Annibaldo as part of a peace envoy which resulted in the Truce of Calais.

Etienne was made cardinal-bishop of Ostia and Velletri on 13 February 1352, by Pope Clement VI, whom he succeeded.

== His papacy ==
Etienne was crowned pope on 30 December 1352 by Cardinal Gaillard de la Mothe after the papal conclave of 1352. Upon his election, he revoked a signed agreement stating the college of cardinals was superior to the pope. His subsequent policy compares favourably with that of the other Avignon Popes. He introduced many needed reforms in the administration of church affairs, and through his legate, Cardinal Albornoz, who was accompanied by Rienzi, he sought to restore order in Rome. In 1355, Charles IV, Holy Roman Emperor, was crowned in Rome with Innocent's permission, after having made an oath that he would quit the city on the day of the ceremony. It was largely through the exertions of Innocent VI that the Treaty of Brétigny (1360) between France and England was brought about. During his pontificate, the Byzantine emperor John V Palaeologus offered to submit the Greek Orthodox Church to the Roman See in return for assistance against John VI Cantacuzenus. The resources at the disposal of the Pope, however, were all required for exigencies nearer home, and the offer was declined.

Most of the wealth accumulated by John XXII and Benedict XII had been lost during the extravagant pontificate of Clement VI. Innocent VI economised by cutting the chapel staff (capellani capelle) from twelve to eight. Works of art were sold rather than commissioned. His pontificate was dominated by the war in Italy and by Avignon's recovery from the plague, both of which made draining demands on his treasury. By 1357, he was complaining of poverty.

Innocent VI was a liberal patron of letters. If the extreme severity of his measures against the Fraticelli is ignored, he retains a high reputation for justice and mercy. However, St. Bridget of Sweden denounced him as a persecutor of Christians. He died on 12 September 1362 and was succeeded by Urban V. Today, his tomb can be found in the Chartreuse du Val de Bénédiction, the Carthusian monastery in Villeneuve-lès-Avignon.

== See also ==
- Cardinals created by Innocent VI
- List of popes

== Sources ==
- Coulombe, Charles A. (2003). Vicars of Christ: A History of the Popes. Citadel Press. ISBN 9780806523705.
- Rollo-Koster, Joëlle (2015). Avignon and Its Papacy, 1309-1417: Popes, Institutions, and Society. Rowman & Littlefield Publishers.
- Tomasello, Music and Ritual at Papal Avignon 1309–1403. Ann Arbor, Michigan: UMI Research Press, 1983.
- Louis XI (king of France), Josepf Frederic, Louis Vaesen, Etienne Charavay, Bernard Edouard de Mandrot-1905.(Googles livres)
- Societe' d'etudes de la province de Cambrai, Lille-1907
- Antoine Pellisier (1961). Innocent VI :le reformateur, deuxième pape Limousin (1352–1362)

Catholic Church titles
| Preceded by Bertrand du Pouget | Cardinal-bishop of Ostia; 1353–1361 | Succeeded by Pierre Bertrand de Colombier |
| Preceded by Clement VI | Pope; 1352 – 1362 | Succeeded by Urban V |
