= Raymonde =

Raymonde is a given name. Notable people with the name include:

== Given name ==
- Raymonde Allain (1912–2008), French model and actress
- Raymonde April (born 1953), Canadian artist, photographer and academic
- Raymonde Arsen née Vital, servant in the Comté de Foix in the early 14th century
- Raymonde Berthoud (1919–2007), the fourth of Henri Berthoud and Marianne Perrier's five children
- Raymonde Delaunois (1885–1984), Belgian mezzo-soprano opera singer
- Raymonde Folco, Canadian politician
- Raymonde Gagné (born 1957), Canadian politician and academic
- Raymonde Guyot (1935–2021), French film editor
- Raymonde Veber Jones (1917–2016), French tennis player
- Raymonde Jore (1917–1995), New Caledonian member of the French resistance
- Raymonde Kacou (born 1987), Ivorian footballer
- Raymonde de Kervern (1899–1973), Mauritian poet
- Raymonde de Laroche (1882–1919), French pilot, first woman to receive an aeroplane pilot's licence
- Raymonde Naigre (born 1960), French sprinter
- Raymonde Rolly (1917–1988), New Caledonian member of the French resistance
- Raymonde Saint-Germain (born 1951), Canadian public servant and politician
- Raymonde of Sebonde (1385–1436), Catalan scholar, teacher of medicine and philosophy, theologist
- Raymonde Testanière, known as Vuissane, servant in the Comté de Foix in the late 13th and early 14th centuries
- Raymonde Le Texier (born 1939), French politician from Val-d'Oise
- Raymonde Tillon (1915–2016), French politician
- Henri Marie Raymonde Toulouse-Lautrec (1864–1901), French painter, printmaker, draughtsman, caricaturist, and illustrator
- Raymonde Vergauwen (1928–2018), Dutch swimmer
- Raymonde Vincent (1908–1985), French woman of letters
- Raymonde Vital, lived in the Comté de Foix in the fourteenth century, made notable when Emmanuel Le Roy Ladurie wrote about her in his 1975 book Montaillou

== Surname ==
- Ivor Raymonde (1926–1990), British musician, songwriter, arranger and actor
- Roy Raymonde (1929–2009), British editorial cartoonist e.g. in Playboy, Punch and The Sunday Telegraph
- Simon Raymonde (born 1962), English musician and record producer
- Tania Raymonde (born 1988), American actress

== See also ==
- Aymond
- Ramond
- Ramone (disambiguation)
- Raymon
- Raymond
- Raymonden
