= Pierre Maury =

Pierre Maury (1282 or 1283 – after 1324) was a shepherd in the Comté de Foix. His life is known through his deposition, and the depositions of his friends and associates, to Bishop Jacques Fournier who was hunting for Cathar heretics. He plays a prominent role in Emmanuel Le Roy Ladurie's study Montaillou, village occitan de 1294 à 1324 and in some ways is that book's protagonist.

== Early life ==
Maury was born in the small town of Montaillou one of eight known children of Raymond Maury, a weaver. While most in the town of Montaillou did some weaving, Raymond Maury was the only one to sell his wool rather than use it in the home, and was one of only two artisans in the town at the time, the other being Arnaud Vital, a cobbler. Needing humidity for the weaving, his house had a special cave-like area where he worked. Raymond Maury's weaving could not sustain the family and like most villagers he kept some sheep. Pierre Maury became a shepherd caring for the sheep of a number of the villagers. During his youth he was converted from Catholicism to Albigensianism by his brother Guillaume, and neighbour Guillaume Belot.

== Cathar links ==
At age 18 Maury left home for the Val d'Arques where he worked as a shepherd for his cousin Raymond Maulen. While living with and working for his cousin, Maury fell in love with Bernadette d'Esquinath, a girl from the village. This passionate relationship persisted for two years, but his fellow Cathars disapproved as she was a Catholic. Pierre abandoned Bernadette when he was hired as a shepherd by Raymond Pierre, and became involved with his employer's daughter, another Bernadette. The Pierres were dedicated Cathars and since Raymond was without sons, he hoped to make Maury his heir. Pierre became closely involved in the Cathar community, helping guide Perfects from village to village. Through this duty he developed a much envied collection: pieces of bread, each blessed by a different Cathar parfait.

In 1305 however, Jacques Authié, a local Cathar leader was captured, and the villagers of Arques, fearing punishment, abandoned the open practice of Albigensianism and traveled en masse to Avignon to seek absolution from the Pope. Maury refused to renounce his Albigensianism and did not participate. He stayed in the village to look after the flocks of those who were away. When the now Catholic villagers returned, Maury went home to Montaillou. Since the villagers had revealed all to the authorities, Maury was now a known but unabsolved heretic; and he became a fugitive from the Inquisition.

He spent Christmas of 1305 with his family in Montaillou before going into the employ of Barthélemy Borrel who sent him to Catalonia to look after sheep he owned there. Living amongst the nomadic groups of shepherds Maury no longer had many dealings with Cathars and was unknown to the local Inquisition. After two years of working for Borrel, Maury visited the fair in Laroques d'Olmes. There he stayed with his 18-year-old sister, Guillemette, and brother-in-law Bertrand Piquier. That night Piquier severely beat his wife. While a husband's power was considered absolute, Maury was greatly concerned about this brutality to his sister. A few days later he returned to the town and stole away with his sister, entrusting her to a pair of parfaits.

For his absenteeism during this incident Borrel fired Maury, but he soon found another job working as a shepherd for Guillaume André. He spent three years working for André, travelling through Catalonia and Foix with the flocks of sheep and other shepherds. At some point in this period he was accused of fraternizing with a known heretic, but escaped the charge by pretending to having been miles away from the incident, a story backed up by his friends. He also successfully avoided the round-up of the heretics of Montaillou in 1308, being warned by Bernard Fort, who supplied flour to the shepherds. In 1309 Maury left the employ of André and worked for Pierre Constant of Rasiguières for a year before joining with his brother Arnaud in working for Raymond Boursier. In 1311 Pierre and Arnaud left this group, Arnaud going home to Montaillou and Pierre to Catalonia where he joined a team of shepherds working for Barthélemy Companho.

=== Bélibaste affair ===
In Catalonia he came in contact with the small group of Cathar exiles led by the parfait Guillaume Bélibaste. Over the next several years Maury traveled through Catalonia and the eastern Pyrenees. As a skilled shepherd his services were in demand and he could find work throughout the region. Maury became comparatively wealthy for a peasant due to his skill, hard work, and ability to find the best paying employers. Despite his many travels he frequently met up with Bélibaste, who pressured the nomadic shepherd to settle down. At one point, Belibaste prevailed on him to marry Raymonde Piquier, a blacksmith's daughter, who was Belibaste's lover and pregnant with his child. Pierre agreed and the pair were married. But the marriage lasted only a few days. Bélibaste then told Maury to have it annulled. Months later Raymonde gave birth to a child. Most of Maury's friends were convinced that the parfait had used Pierre to cover the breaking of his own vow of chastity. Maury however, continued to trust the parfait.

== Capture ==
Bélibaste's Cathar community was demolished when the Inquisition sent Arnaud Sicre to infiltrate and inform on the group. Soon afterwards, Bélibaste, then Maury, were captured. In 1324 Maury was imprisoned and there is no record of him past this date.
