= Guillaume Bélibaste =

14th-century Cathar preacher

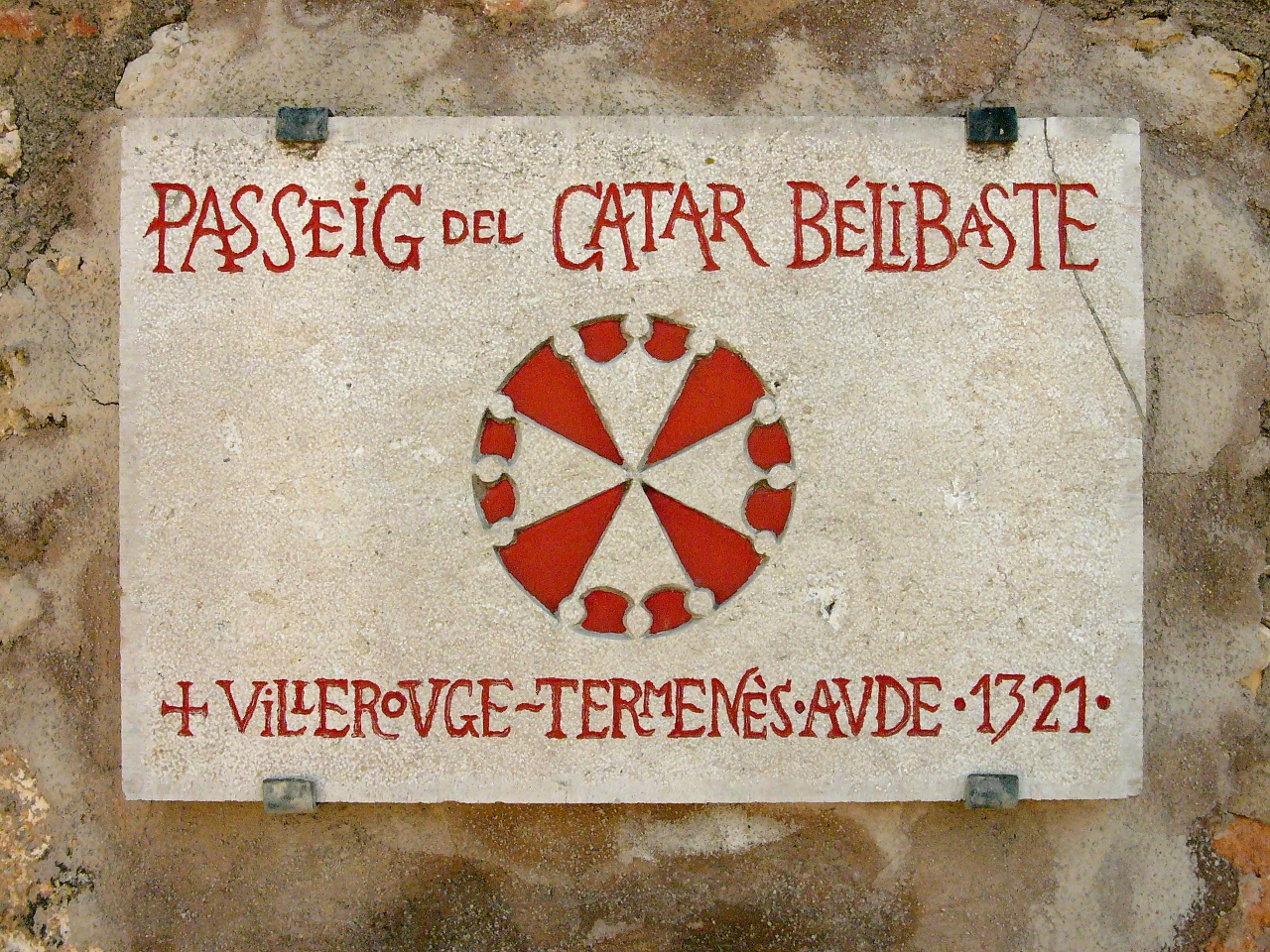
Stone plaque dedicated to Bélibaste in Sant Mateu

Guillaume Bélibaste (occitan: Guilhèm Belibasta) is said to have been the last Cathar parfait in Languedoc. He was burned at the stake in 1321, as a result of the Inquisition at Pamiers led by Jacques Fournier (afterwards Pope Benedict XII). Much of Bélibaste's biography can be found in the pages of Emmanuel Le Roy Ladurie's Montaillou; although Bélibaste never lived at Montaillou, he is frequently mentioned in the interrogations of suspected heretics from Montaillou.

He was the son and namesake of Guillaume Bélibaste, a rich farmer at Cubières. After killing a shepherd, he had to leave Cubières and became a shepherd himself, and, in due course, a parfait. As a Cathar preacher, he was the pupil of Pierre and Jacques Authié.

He eventually settled in the Kingdom of Valencia at Sant Mateu and then Morella in the Maestrazgo, where he made baskets and carding combs and became a mentor to a community of Cathars, some of whom had fled persecution in the Languedoc. Others migrated regularly between the two regions. One of the latter was Pierre Maury, a native of Montaillou.

When, in 1320, his lover, Raymonde Piquier, became pregnant, Bélibaste persuaded Pierre Maury to marry her. Then, a few days later, he dissolved the marriage and salvaged his own reputation by making it appear the child was Maury's. Eventually he was betrayed by the spy Arnaud Sicre in the service of the Inquisition. Bélibaste was taken to Villerouge Termenes, interrogated and burnt at the stake there.

== Bibliography ==
- (in French) Gauthier Langlois, « Bélibaste, le dernier parfait cathare occitan », Paratge, 2012.
- Emmanuel Le Roy Ladurie, Montaillou: The Promised Land of Error. translated by Barbara Bray. New York: G. Braziller, c1978.
- Emmanuel Le Roy Ladurie, ed., Autour de Montaillou - un village occitan; histoire et religiosité d'une communauté villageoise au Moyen Âge. Actes du colloque de Montaillou (25-26-27 août 2000). Castelnaud la Chapelle, 2001.
