= Grazide Lizier =

Grazide Lizier née Fauré (fl. 1321) was a peasant in the Comté de Foix in the late thirteenth and early fourteenth century. Her home region was known for being Cathar, and, during an anti-Cathar inquisition carried out by Catholic authorities, she was interrogated. A number of facts about her are recorded in the Fournier Register, and her life, along with those of her fellow villagers, was analyzed in Emmanuel Le Roy Ladurie's Montaillou.

Grazide was the daughter of Pons and Frabrisse Rives. Her mother was the town wine seller. At the age of fifteen or sixteen she became mistress to Pierre Clergue, the local priest, who, though Grazide insisted she hadn't known at the time, was allegedly her mother's illegitimate cousin. Clergue was known as a local rake, and had many sexual relationships with many women.

A year later, at Clergue's behest, Grazide married an elderly local, Pierre Lizier of Montaillou. The affair between her and Clergue continued, however, with the consent of her husband. The marriage lasted only four years with Pierre Lizier dying when Grazide was twenty. Soon after, Grazide also ended the relationship with Pierre Clergue.

During her testimony, Grazide stated that she had not believed that having sex with Clergue was a sin. For one thing, Clergue, being a priest, had told her it was not a sin. But, more than that, she simply stated that because she had liked it, and Pierre had liked it, it could not have offended God, so it could not have been a sin.

It is not known what happened to Grazide after her testimony.
