= Pierre Clergue =

Pierre Clergue was a priest in the village of Montaillou, France in the late thirteenth and early fourteenth century. He is the central figure in Emmanuel Le Roy Ladurie's 1975 book Montaillou, a pioneering work of microhistory. Since then he has appeared in a number of other histories, and as the villain in the fictional work The Good Men by Charmaine Craig.

== Family ==
Pierre was the son of Pons and Mengarde Clergue. The Clergues were a family of wealthy peasants, by far the wealthiest in Montaillou and their power extended throughout the region. Pierre, the head of the family after the death of his father, became the priest of the village. His brother Bernard Clergue became the local bayle, the enforcer of laws and collector of taxes. The Clergue brothers thus had a central role in being the representatives of both religious and secular power in the town. As one of the few educated men in town Pierre Clergue also served as a notary and performed other such tasks.

== Catharism ==
Despite being a priest in a Roman Catholic church Pierre Clergue was a staunch Albigensian having been converted by the parfait Guillaume Authié. For many years he played an important role by convincing the inquisition to ignore Montaillou, despite its being filled with heretics. This changed in about 1300, when Pierre Clergue began to inform on some members of his parish. In 1308 he played a central role in the inquisition's move to arrest the entire adult population of the town. Pierre decided which villagers would be freed and which punished. He used this power to satisfy personal grievances. During this time he and his brother continued to provide shelter and aid to certain Cathars.

== Affairs with women ==
Pierre Clergue is notable for his sexual appetite—celibacy among priests was not strictly enforced in the Pyrenees at this time—having many mistresses over his long career as priest and virtual ruler of the town. The most important of these was Béatrice de Planisoles who as châtelaine was the nominal ruler of the village. Le Roy Ladurie lists nine women of Montaillou with whom he conducted affairs: Alazaïs Fauré, Raymonde Fauré, Béatrice de Planisoles, Grazide Lizier, Alazaïs Azéma, Gaillarde Benet, Alissende Roussel, Mengarde Buscailh, Na Maragda, Jacotte den Tort, Raymonde Guilhou, and Esclarmonde Clergue, his sister in law.

Pierre Clergue justified his philandering in several ways. Cathar doctrine taught that all sex was sinful, though more so within the confines of marriage, as the couple did not believe that they were erring. Since he expected to be absolved from all his sins upon his deathbed in the consolamentum he also felt he could sin without having to suffer for it.

In 1320 Pierre Clergue was arrested by the inquisition under the orders of Bishop Jacques Fournier. Despite a concerted campaign of bribery and calling in favours by his brother Bernard, Pierre remained in prison and eventually died there. There is no record of his testifying before the Inquisition.

== Literature ==
- Le Roy Ladurie, Emmanuel. Montaillou: The Promised Land of Error. Translated by Barbara Bray. New York: Braziller, 1978.
