= Arnaud Vital =

Arnaud Vital was a cobbler in the Comté de Foix in the early fourteenth century. He is notable for appearing in Emmanuel Le Roy Ladurie's Montaillou. Originally from a peasant family in Prades d'Aillon, he moved to Montaillou living as a boarder in the house of the Belot family. He was later joined by his sister Raymonde who came to work as a servant in the Belot home.

Arnaud was a committed Albigensian and spent much time guiding parfaits through the mountains. He was also a great womanizer, the lover of Alazaïs Fauré whom he converted to Catharism. At one point he tried to force himself upon Raymonde Testanière, mistress to Bernard Belot, but she resisted him. Arnaud later married another servant in the Belot household named Raymonde. The couple lived with the Belots another two months before leaving and setting up their own home.

Vital was one of only two artisans in town the other being Raymond Maury the weaver. While his business was somewhat limited by the lack of money in the village he was successful enough to become only the third villager to add a solier to his home. He also became assistant bayle in the town to Bernard Clergue. His marriage was unhappy, however, he ignored his wife and continued to philander with women such as Raymonde Rives and Alazaïs Gavela.
