= Clergue =

Clergue (French: [klɛʁg]) is a surname. Notable people with this surname include:

- Bernard Clergue, French bayle
- Francis Clergue (1856–1939), American businessman
- François-Léon Clergue (1825–1907), French priest
- Lucien Clergue (1934–2014), French photographer
- Pierre Clergue, French priest

== See also ==
- Clergue (river), Canada
- Ermatinger Clergue National Historic Site, Canada
