= Caussou =

Commune in Occitanie, France

- Commune
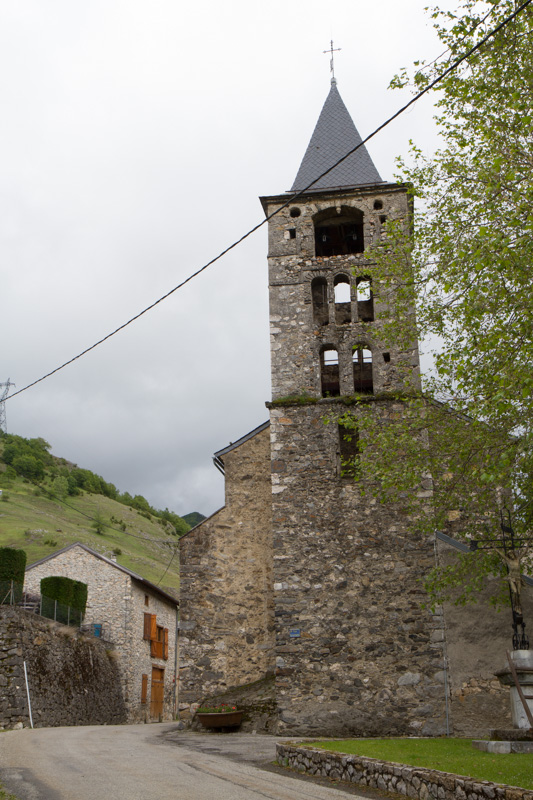
- The church in Caussou
- Location of Caussou
- Location within France Location within Occitanie
- Coordinates: 42°46′11″N 1°48′23″E
- Country: France
- Region: Occitania
- Department: Ariège
- Arrondissement: Foix
- Canton: Haute-Ariège

Government
  - Mayor (2020–2026): Anne Laplume
- Area^{1}: 15.83 km^{2} (6.11 sq mi)
- Elevation: 840 m (2,760 ft)
- Highest elevation: 1,920 m (6,300 ft)
- Lowest elevation: 760 m (2,490 ft)
- Population (2023): 51
  - Density: 3.2/km^{2} (8.3/sq mi)
- Time zone: UTC+01:00 (CET)
  - Summer (DST): UTC+02:00 (CEST)
- INSEE/Postal code: 09087 /09250
- ^{1} French Land Register data, which excludes lakes, ponds, glaciers > 1 km^{2} (0.386 sq mi or 247 acres) and river estuaries.

Caussou (French pronunciation: [kosu]; Occitan: Causson) is a commune in the Ariège department in the Occitanie region in southwestern France.

Its church is dedicated to St Jean Baptist.

== Geography ==
The village gives its name to the Val de Caussou, which is a 6-mile-long cut connecting the Ariège valley to the Col de Marmare; the village overlooks the confluence of two streams:

- Rusisseau de la Coume d'Amont - (known in the 13th century as the brook of Caussou) and
- Marmare

The Rusisseau de la Coume d'Amont bisects the village on a north–south basis, whilst the Marmare rises some three miles north east of the village from near the top of the Col de Marmare. Behind the Marmare are located the Cathar stronghold villages of Prades d'Aillon and Montaillou.

== Cathar associations ==
This part of France is famous for its Cathar associations and the village gave birth to the famous Cathar Béatrice de Planisoles - the one-time châtelaine of Montaillou. Her family were minor nobility in the area.

In the 13th and early 14th centuries, the route over the Col de Marmare was an important route for the Cathars and provided them with a lifeline. From Caussou to either Prades d'Aillon or Montaillou involves and arduous 7 mile journey - beginning with a gentle slope up and past the Marmare and then rises steeply for approximately 2 miles to the col itself.

From the early thirteenth century for the next 7 or 8 decades, Caussou was greatly affected by the Inquisitions and saw many of its inhabitants forced to wear the Yellow cross - the punishment sign of the heretics.

Béatrice's father was an ardent Cathar and frequently accommodated the Cathar Perfects in his Caussou house.

It was in 1322 in the Caussou garden of Béatrice's uncle Pons de Planisoles, that her cousin Raymond and an accomplice by the name of Bourret buried the body of a shepherd that he had murdered. The aristocratic Raymond was never charged with the murder, but the hapless Bourret was hanged for the offence at Foix. At his trial in an attempt to reek revenge, Bourret had implicated one of Béatrice's brothers Bernard as a Cathar heretic; as a result, on 4 July 1322, Bernard, who still lived at Caussou, was sentenced to wear the Yellow cross by the Inquisition.

== Population ==
The inhabitants are called Caussounais in French.

Historical population
Year	Pop.	±% p.a.
1968	145	—
1975	119	−2.78%
1982	95	−3.17%
1990	72	−3.41%
1999	84	+1.73%
2007	68	−2.61%
2012	62	−1.83%
2017	54	−2.73%
2023	51	−0.95%
Source: INSEE

== See also ==
- Communes of the Ariège department
