= Raymonde Testanière =

Raymonde Testanière, known as Vuissane, was a servant in the Comté de Foix in the late thirteenth and early fourteenth centuries. She is known to us through her testimony recorded on the Fournier Register and examined in Emmanuel Le Roy Ladurie's Montaillou. Vuissane was a servant in the Belot household from 1304 to 1307. She was also a mistress to Bernard Belot and had two children with him. Vuissane reported to have hoped to marry Bernard, but he was only interested in a wife from a wealthier family and eventually married Guillemette Benet. He also rejected Vuissane as she did not believe in Albigensianism.

Unlike most of the household, Vuissane was not a believer in Albigensianism. Her mother, Alazaïs Testanière, was a staunch Catholic and kept her daughter away from Catharism. The Belots were Cathars and for a time Vuissane looked favourably upon the heresies but this ended when a leading heretic Arnaud Vital, who was living as a boarder in the Belot household, tried to rape her.

After leaving the employ of the Belot household she married Bernard Testanière.
