= Béatrice de Planisoles =

French heretic (c. 1274–after 1322)

Béatrice de Planissoles (circa 1274 – after 1322), was a Cathar minor noble in the Comté de Foix in the late thirteenth and early fourteenth century. She was born circa 1274, probably in the mountain village of Caussou.

A great deal of information about her life was recorded in the Fournier Register. She has a central role in Emmanuel Le Roy Ladurie's Montaillou.

Béatrice was the daughter of Philippe de Planissoles, a noble who was later convicted of supporting the Cathar heresy. Béatrice herself was sympathetic towards Catharism, but remained attached to the Catholic Church in some respects.

At around the age of twenty, Béatrice was married to Bérenger de Roquefort, the châtelain of the small and largely Cathar community of Montaillou. Despite living in the fortress above the town, Béatrice's life was closely linked with that of the local peasants and there was much intermixing. Béatrice was not in love with her husband, an entirely normal state of affairs as noble women usually married for economic reasons. Raymond Roussel, the steward of the châtelain's estate, attempted to begin an affair with her. When Roussel tried to sleep with her, however, she had him fired.

In 1302, de Roquefort died and left Béatrice a widow. At this point, the villager Pathau Clergue raped her. She declined an affair with Pathau when he pressed her to begin one. Soon, however, a relationship began with Pathau's cousin, Pierre Clergue, the priest and the most powerful man in the village. This relationship lasted two years before Béatrice decided to leave the mountain village and marry another minor noble, Otho de Lagleize. He, too, died after only a few years of marriage.

In her older years, Béatrice took up with a young priest, Barthélemy Amilhac. She was past menopause, but fell in love with the priest. They ran away together, were united in a form of marriage and remained away for a year. After a number of years, this relationship ended as Barthélemy worried he would be placed in danger by Béatrice's Cathar past. He was correct in his concerns and they were both arrested by the inquisition and held for a year.

Béatrice first appeared before the Inquisition on Saturday, 26 July 1320, at the Episcopal Palace in Pamiers. She had been summoned to the hearing by Jacques Fournier, the Bishop of Pamiers, to answer charges of blasphemy, witchcraft and heresy. The charge of witchcraft was supported by the contents of her purse, which included a variety of "objects, strongly suggestive of having been used by her to cast evil spells": two umbilical cords of her grandsons, which ensured victory in any lawsuit; linens soaked with her daughter's first menstrual blood, meant to be drunk by the daughter's husband to ensure his love; frankincense to cure bad headaches; some of the herb rocket, Eruca sativa, thought to enhance sperm quality and sexual vigor, which Beatrice refrained from telling Fournier was meant for her husband, the priest; a mirror and a small knife wrapped in a piece of linen; the seed of the herb ive, wrapped in muslin, as a remedy for epilepsy for her grandson; a dry piece of bread called "tinhol" (possibly millet bread); written formulas; and numerous morsels of linen. None of the items, explained Beatrice, was to be used in black magic, that is, divination and the making of mischief. Indeed, Rene Weis comments that Fournier would have recognized the contents as innocuous charms and love potions, except for the bread, which indicated Cathar interests. Beatrice had failed to mention the bread at all; Fournier knew that it must be consecrated bread carried as a talisman.

Barthélemy and Beatrice spent a year in prison and were both released on July 4, 1322, but Béatrice was sentenced to wear the yellow cross forever as punishment, while the priest escaped further sentence.

With her husbands, she had two sons, Guillaume and Bernard, and five daughters: Condors, Esclarmonde, Philippa, Ava and Gentille.
