= Arnaud Baille/Sicre =

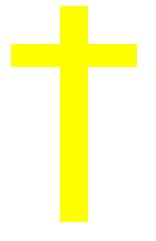

Arnaud Baille/Sicre was a cobbler in the Comté de Foix in the late thirteenth and early fourteenth century. A number of details about his life are known to us through the Fournier Register, and Emmanuel Le Roy Ladurie's analysis of those records.

Raised in Ax-les-Thermes he was the son of Arnaud Sicre, a notary, and Sybille Baille. His father was a Catholic and worked as a writer for the Church. His mother, however, was a firm Cathar. The marriage did not last, and Sybille forced her husband out of the house. Sybille readopted her maiden name, while Arnaud Jr. and his brother Bernard, would alternate between surnames, sometimes using both. At the age of seven Arnaud was sent to live with his father in Tarascon-sur-Ariège so that he could be educated.

His mother's heresy was uncovered by the Inquisition. Sybille was arrested, and was eventually burned at the stake after relapsing into Catharism. The family's property was confiscated. This left Arnaud embittered, as his mother's heresy had cost him his inheritance. He became an itinerant cobbler.

In an attempt to win back the family home, Arnaud decided on becoming an informer for the Inquisition. He was sent to Catalonia where a number of Cathar exiles were in hiding. Arnaud joined this group and eventually convinced a number of them to return to the Comté to attend his sister's wedding. Forces of the Inquisition were waiting and a number of the heretics were captured, including their leader Guillaume Bélibaste and the shepherd Pierre Maury.
