= Raymonde Arsen =

Raymonde Arsen née Vital was a servant in the Comté de Foix in the early fourteenth century. She was made notable by appearing in Emmanuel Le Roy Ladurie's Montaillou. Born in Prades d'Aillon to a poor peasant family in 1306 she left to work in the home of Bonet de la Coste in town Pamiers.

Whilst in the city she had an illegitimate child who she named Alazaïs. As a servant she could not care for the girl and she lived with a series of nurses. Later she was approached by her cousin Raymond Belot of Montaillou who needed a servant to replace his sister, Raymonde, who was soon to be wed to Bernard Clergue. She agreed and worked for the Belots. She lived in a small barn and her primary duties were baking bread and washing clothes. Also in the home was her brother Arnaud Vital a cobbler who was boarding with the Belots. She worked for the Belots for one year, later marrying Prades den Arsen and settling in Prades d'Aillon. Later in life she was arrested for heresy and she told the inquisition much about her associates. In 1324 she was sentenced by the Inquisition to wear the yellow cross forever as a punishment.
