= Raymon =

Given name

Raymon is a given name. Notable people with the name include:

- Raymon Anning, former Commissioner of Police of Hong Kong
- Raymon Ayala (born 1977), known as Daddy Yankee, Latin Grammy Award-winning Puerto Rican Reggaeton recording artist
- Raymon van der Biezen (born 1987), Dutch BMX racer
- Raymon van Emmerik (born 1980), Dutch footballer
- Raymon Gaddis or Ray Gaddis (born 1990), American soccer player
- Raymon W. Herndon (1918–1942), United States Marine in World War II
- Raymon de Penaforte (1175–1275), Catalan Dominican friar in the 13th-century, who compiled the Decretals of Gregory IX
- Raymon Reifer (born 1991), Barbadian cricketer
- Raymon Youmaran, member of Dlasthr (The Last Hour), an Assyrian criminal gang active in Sydney, Australia

== See also ==
- USS Raymon W. Herndon (APD-121), United States Navy high-speed transport in commission from 1944 to 1946
- Ramona
- Ramone (disambiguation)
- Ramón (disambiguation)
- Raemon Sluiter (born 1978), Dutch former tennis player
- Raemon, North Carolina, United States, a census-designated place
- Rayman
- Raymond
- Reamonn
- Ryman
