= Credentes =

Householders among Cathars and Waldenses

Credentes or Believers, were the ordinary followers of what became known as the Cathar or Albigensian movement, a heretical sect which flourished in western Europe during the 11th, 12th and 13th centuries. Credentes constituted the main part of the Cathar community in the region. Although Catharism sprang up in Spain, the Rhineland, Flanders and Italy its main focus was in the southern region of France, particularly the area known as the Languedoc. Although pacifist in nature, Catharism drew the condemnation of the Catholic Church which, when persuasion failed, launched successive Crusades and instigated the Inquisition to destroy it.

== Catharism ==
Catharism was a self-described Christian movement which incorporated Gnostic and dualistic ideas into its interpretation of Scripture. The terms Cathar, Catharism and even Perfecti and Credentes were ones used by their persecutors, the religious and temporal authorities of the time. The Cathars themselves never referred to themselves as such, calling themselves only "Bons Hommes", "Bonnes Femmes" or "Bons Chrétiens" (i.e. "Good Men", "Good Women" and "Good Christians"). They believed that all human beings contained within them an element of the Divine Light trapped in bodies of Matter by "the Prince of this world", Satan (cf Gospel of John) who had created the material universe as a consequence of his rebellion against God. Christ was an emissary of God, sent into this world to help us return to the Father.

Catharism held to a doctrine of reincarnation, the individual soul being born into this world of suffering again and again until it had reached the state of inner purification which meant it could return. It was in this way that the Cathars interpreted the idea of Eternal Life in Jesus Christ. They argued for a return to the essence of Christ's teaching, an embracing of the Apostolic ideal of human behaviour and rejected the established Church as "the Synagogue of Satan" for having turned its back on Christ's message with its vast material power, wealth and corruption.

== Credentes and Perfecti ==
The Cathar community was layered between the spiritual elite and the ordinary believers, much as other Christian communities were. The elite were referred to by the Catholic Church as Perfecti (Parfaits in French, Perfects in English). The Perfecti consisted of both men and women and traveled around the Languedoc in same-sex pairs administering to the community spiritually and as healers. The rest of the Cathar followers were referred to as Credentes, or Believers. These constituted the majority of the movement and were not expected to adopt the austere lifestyle of the Perfecti, who, as carriers of the Holy Spirit, lived lives of extreme poverty as well as abstinence from sexual contact and eating meat.

Credentes vied for the honour of housing Perfecti on their travels in the tradition described in the Gospel of Luke of how the Apostles were to move among the wider community. As the Cathars built no churches or places of worship, preferring to hold their ceremonies in peoples' homes or natural places such as fields, caves or forests it was a particular honour to have the sacraments performed in one's own place of dwelling.

Credentes had the option of becoming Perfecti after a long and arduous process of training, after which they were inducted into the Perfecti community. They were then expected to follow the rigid vows of the elite for the rest of their lives. At death, Credentes could also ask for the Consolamentum, the equivalent of the Last Rites of the Cathar community. This was a ceremony of purification of sins which was intended to enable the soul to pass into death in a higher spiritual state, thus enabling it to achieve a better incarnation in its next existence in this world or return to God.

An interesting feature of the structure of Cathar faith was its correspondence with that of the early Christian Gnostic movement of Bishop Valentinus. As the Cathars divided themselves among Perfecti and Credentes, with everyone else as non-Believers, the Valentinians divided the world into three categories: Pneumatics whose souls were wholly united with God (i.e. Perfecti), Psychics, who had a connection with God through their spirits but still lived in this world (i.e. Credentes) and Hylics, people who lived only in the world of Matter and had no spiritual dimension to their existence at all. In practice this did not mean discrimination among the Cathars either between Perfecti and Credentes or between Cathars and non-Cathars. Indeed, evidence suggests that the non-Cathar (i.e. Catholic) population of the Languedoc viewed the Cathars among them with tolerance and in many cases, admiration. The sacking of Béziers by the Crusaders, for instance, came about because the population of the city (some 18-20 thousand people) refused to hand over 2000 Cathars who lived among them. This suggests that however stratified the Cathar community may have been it did not view humanity hierarchically, otherwise its followers would not have received such support from the non-Cathar community.

== Persecution ==
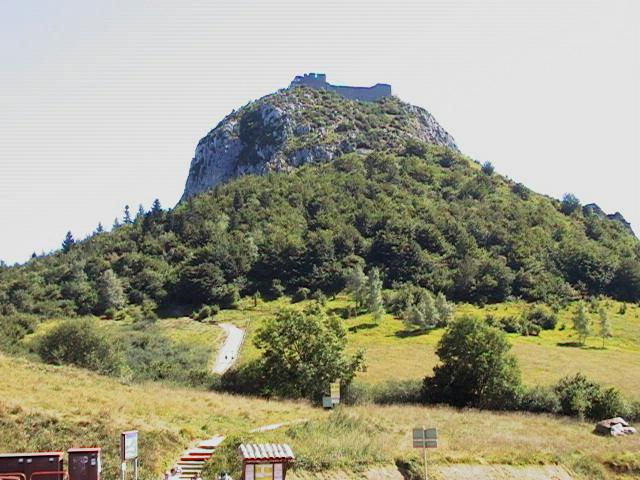
Montségur, where the Cathars made their last stand

As with their Perfecti leaders, the Credentes underwent immense persecution at the hands of the Catholic Church and the temporal authorities of the day who invaded their regions through a crusade launched by the Pope at the time. Although largely wiped out by the mid 13th century, some isolated Cathar communities survived in the Languedoc until the 14th century, most famously at the small village of Montaillou in the Ariege region of the French Pyrenees.

It is said that on the last night of the Siege of Montségur, the last major Cathar stronghold to resist the Crusaders before the movement was finally destroyed, the Perfecti present gave the Credentes the option to become Perfecti, thus condemning them to the stake, or to go free as part of the conditions of surrender agreed with the besieging forces. Twenty six Credentes came forward to do so, thus facing certain death rather than recant their faith.

== See also ==
- Antonin Gadal
- Cathar yellow cross
- Gnosticism
