= Brune Pourcel =

Brune Pourcel née Tavernier was a woman who lived in the Comté de Foix in the early fourteenth century, she was made notable by appearing in Emmanuel Le Roy Ladurie's Montaillou. A bastard daughter of Prades Tavernier she became a servant in the house of the wealthy Clergue family of Montaillou. She left their employ upon being married but her husband soon died leaving her a poor widow. She could not even afford her own oven, being forced to use that of her aunt Alazaïs Rives.
