= Prades Tavernier =

French weaver

Prades Tavernier was a weaver and then Cathar parfait in the Comté de Foix in the late thirteenth and early fourteenth century. Tavernier was originally from Prades d'Aillon, and he was named after the town. There he became a successful and prosperous weaver. Though unmarried, he had a bastard daughter named Brune Pourcel.

Tired of weaving Tavernier decided to become a Cathar Perfect and traveled the region preaching and performing Cathar rites. In his travels he spent much of his time in the town of Montaillou, which was a centre of Catharism. Unlike most parfait Tavernier did not come from the bourgeoisie and he was not well grounded in Cathar theology. He thus broke a number of rules, such as performing the consolamentum on an infant.
