= Ramones (disambiguation) =

The Ramones were an American punk rock band.

Ramones may also refer to:

- Adal Ramones (born 1961), Mexican television show host and comedian
- Ramones (album), the Ramones first album
- Ramones (Screeching Weasel album)
- Ramones (Operation Ivy EP), an EP by the ska punk band Operation Ivy

== See also ==
- "R.A.M.O.N.E.S.", a song by Motörhead
- Ramone (disambiguation)
