= Raymonde Vital =

Raymonde Vital was a woman who lived in the Comté de Foix in the early fourteenth century, she was made notable when Emmanuel Le Roy Ladurie wrote about her in his 1975 book Montaillou. Working as a servant in the home of the Belots, one of the wealthier families of the village of Montaillou, she met Arnaud Vital, a cobbler who was boarding there. She married him and the two set up house together, but the marriage was unhappy as Arnaud ignored her in favour of a series of mistresses. After Arnaud died, Raymonde married Bernard Guilhou. For a time she was also the mistress to priest Pierre Clergue.
