= Van Emmerik =

van Emmerik is a surname. Notable people with the surname include:

- Ivo van Emmerik (born 1961), Dutch composer
- Raymon van Emmerik (born 1980), Dutch footballer
