= Château de Montaillou =

Ruined castle in the French village of Montaillou

Coordinates: 42°47′12″N 1°53′39″E

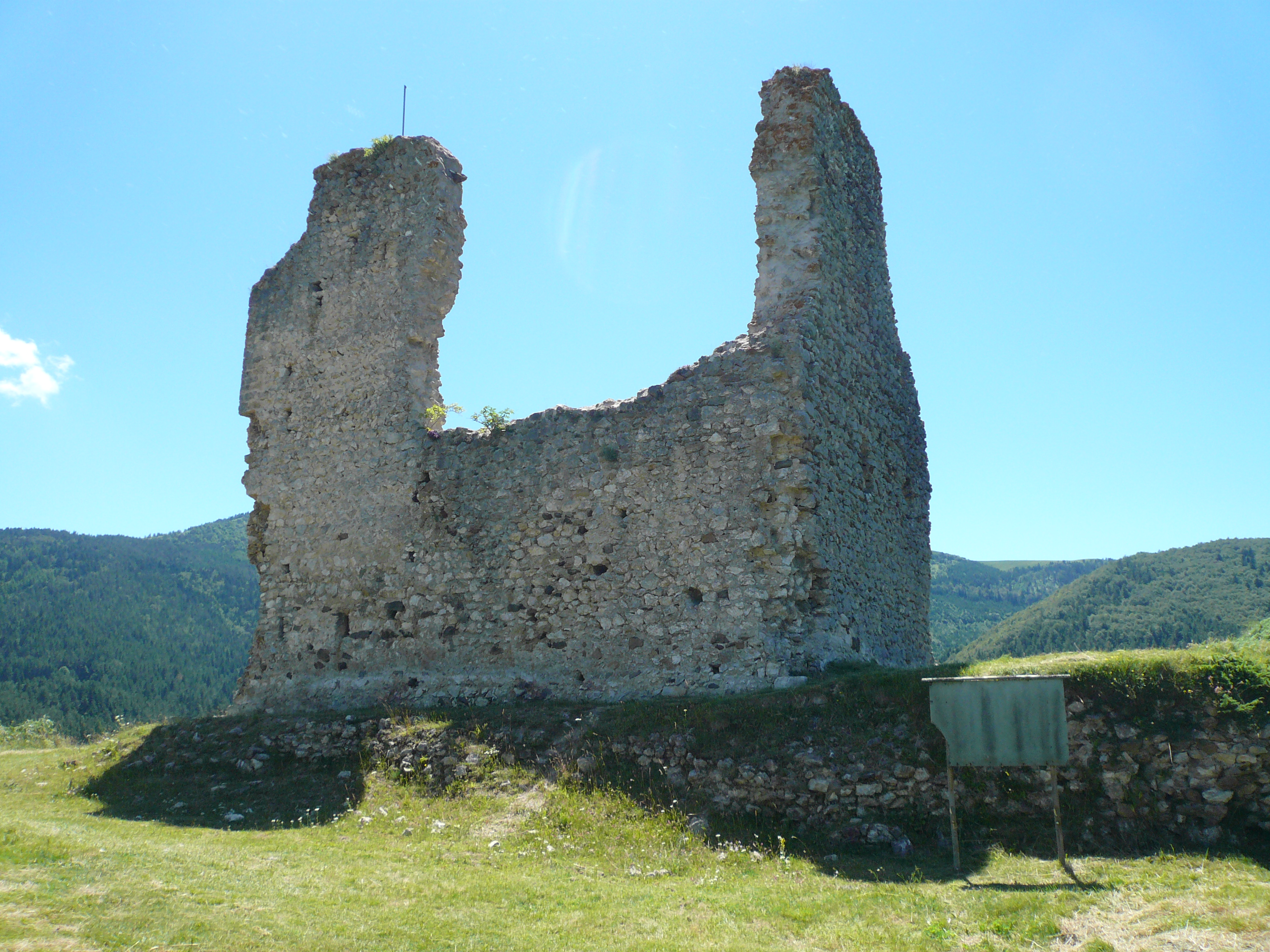
Ruins of the keep

The Château de Montaillou is a ruined castle in the French village of Montaillou, in the Ariège département. The village of Montaillou, standing on the slope of Mount Allion, was made famous in Emmanuel Le Roy Ladurie's history, Montaillou, village occitan.

== Description ==
At the top of the village is all that remains of the rectangular castle: three walls of a ruined keep and evidence of other walls and earthworks. The castle probably had three storeys. The castle was built by the lords of Alion around the end of the 12th century, occupying a platform roughly 100m long by 30 to 40 m wide. Access was controlled by a dry moat cut into bare rock. The courtyard was surrounded by a curtain wall, the base of which is partially conserved. Further dry moats provided defence to the north and east, while to the south the steep slope of the site was sufficient. The plan of the castle was simple: a wall linked to a tower followed the contours of the hill.

== History ==
At the start of the 12th century the fiefdom belonged to the Count of Foix.

In 1226, Bernard d'Alion paid nominal homage to the King of France, but his sympathies still lay with the Cathars. He married Esclarmonde, daughter of Roger IV, Count of Foix in 1236. The witnesses were Cathar parfaits or at least believers.

In 1244, after the Siege of Montségur, the castle was partly razed but must have been rebuilt because it is recorded in a document of 1272 in a list of the Count of Foix's fortresses.

In 1258, Bernard was condemned by the inquisition as a Cathar heretic and burned at the stake in Perpignan. The castle was taken by his father-in-law and became a frontier fortress, between the County of Foix, the French King's lands and Aragon.

At the end of the 13th century, the Count doubled the thickness of the walls. The castle survived the Albigensian Crusade but fell into disrepair later.

In 1638, the castle was demolished by order of Louis XIII

The castle is the property of the commun. It was added to the list of monuments historiques in 1984.

== See also ==
- Montaillou
- List of castles in France
