= Roger Fauroux =

French politician (1926–2021)

Minister of Industry and Regional Planning
- In office 12 May 1988 – 15 May 1991
- President: François Mitterrand
- Prime Minister: Michel Rocard
- Preceded by: Alain Madelin
- Succeeded by: Dominique Strauss-Kahn

Mayor of Saint-Girons
- In office 1989–1995

Personal details
- Born: 21 November 1926 Montpellier, France
- Died: 16 July 2021 (aged 94) 15th arrondissement of Paris, France
- Resting place: Les Moutiers-en-Cinglais
- Spouse: Marie Le Roy Ladurie
- Education: Lycée Henri-IV
- Alma mater: École normale supérieure École nationale d'administration

Roger Fauroux (21 November 1926 – 16 July 2021) was a French politician and civil servant who served as Minister of Industry and Regional Planning from 1988 to 1991.

Fauroux was born in Montpellier, France.
