= Les Moutiers-en-Cinglais =

- Commune
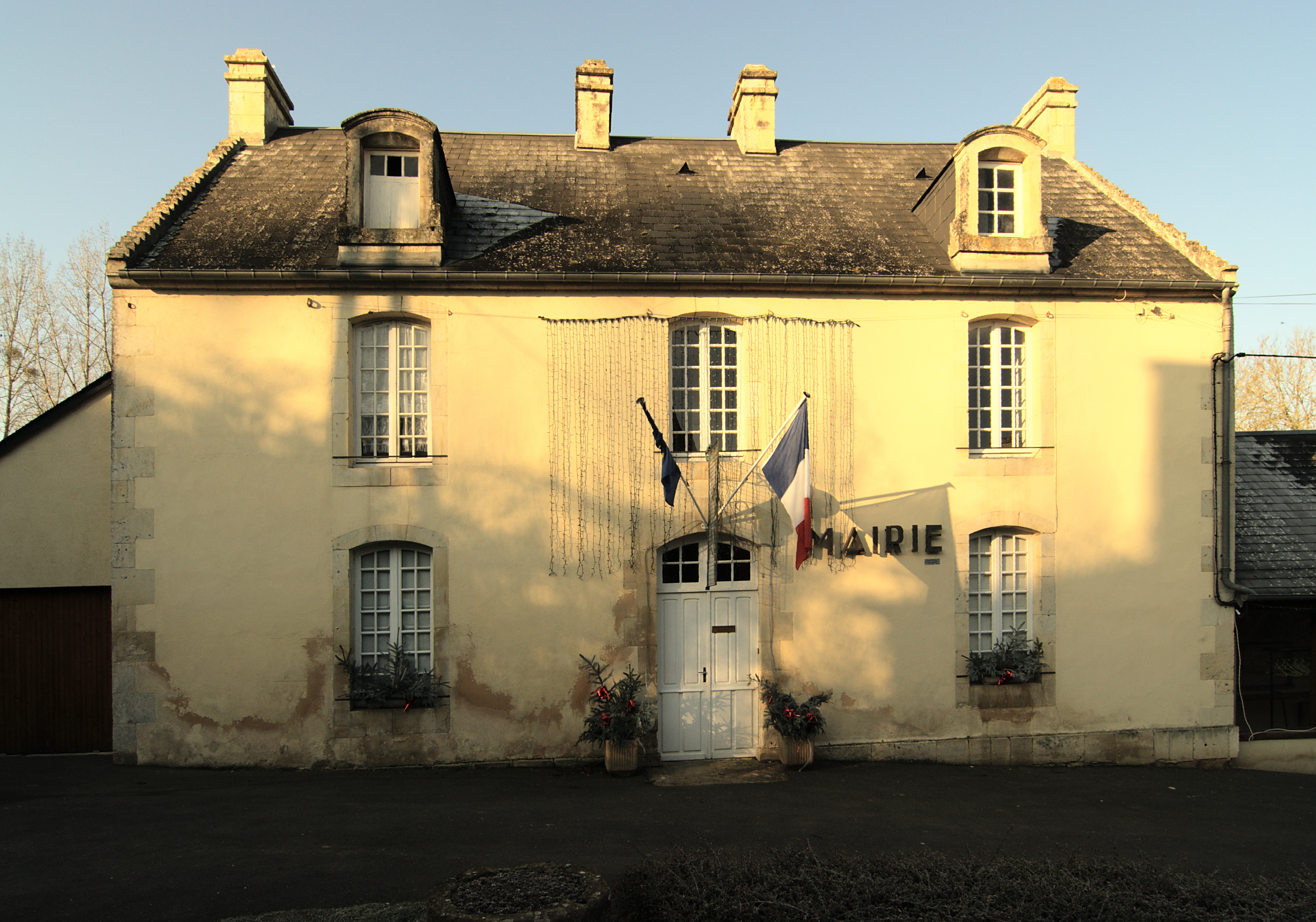
- Town hall
- Location of Les Moutiers-en-Cinglais
- Location within France Location within Normandy
- Coordinates: 49°01′47″N 0°25′39″W
- Country: France
- Region: Normandy
- Department: Calvados
- Arrondissement: Caen
- Canton: Le Hom
- Intercommunality: Cingal-Suisse Normande

Government
  - Mayor (2020–2026): Gérard Allain
- Area^{1}: 6.75 km^{2} (2.61 sq mi)
- Elevation: 114 m (374 ft)
- Highest elevation: 186 m (610 ft)
- Lowest elevation: 15 m (49 ft)
- Population (2023): 528
  - Density: 78.2/km^{2} (203/sq mi)
- Time zone: UTC+01:00 (CET)
  - Summer (DST): UTC+02:00 (CEST)
- INSEE/Postal code: 14458 /14220
- ^{1} French Land Register data, which excludes lakes, ponds, glaciers > 1 km^{2} (0.386 sq mi or 247 acres) and river estuaries.

Les Moutiers-en-Cinglais (French pronunciation: [le mutje ɑ̃ sɛ̃ɡlɛ]) is a commune in the department of Calvados in the Normandy region in northwestern France.

== Geography ==
The commune is part of the area known as Suisse Normande.

The commune is made up of the following collection of villages and hamlets, La Bagotière, L'Église, La Couture and Les Moutiers-en-Cinglais.

The river Orne plus three streams The Neumer, The Trois Cours, and La Grande Vallee are the four watercourses running through the commune.

== Population ==
Historical population
Year	Pop.	±% p.a.
1968	232	—
1975	252	+1.19%
1982	315	+3.24%
1990	350	+1.33%
1999	350	+0.00%
2007	419	+2.27%
2012	420	+0.05%
2017	517	+4.24%
2023	528	+0.35%
Source: INSEE

== Points of interest ==
=== National heritage sites ===
- Château de Villeray is an eighteenth century chateau which was listed as a monument in 2005.

== Notable people ==
- Emmanuel Le Roy Ladurie - (1929 – 2023) French historian, was born here.
- Roger Fauroux - (1926 - 2021) French politician and civil servant who served as Minister of Industry and Regional Planning from 1988 to 1991 is buried here.

== See also ==
- Communes of the Calvados department
