= The Peasants of Languedoc =

Les paysans de Languedoc, translated as The Peasants of Languedoc, is an internationally influential history book by the French Annales school historian Emmanuel Le Roy Ladurie.

== Publication ==
In 1955 Le Roy Ladurie was teaching in the University of Montpellier and his colleague the geographer Raymond Dugrand suggested that he undertake a study of the compoix of Languedoc. In 1956 he published an article on the compoix and how they illustrated the activities of capitalist land engrossers, reflecting the Marxist notion of primitive capitalism. This was written just before his disillusion with Communism after the suppression of the Hungarian Revolution.

This became his doctoral thesis. It attracted attention when it was published as a book in 1966. It was translated into English by John Day as The Peasants of Languedoc in 1974.

== Methods ==
In this study of the peasantry of Languedoc over several centuries, Le Roy Ladurie employed a huge range of quantitative information such as tithe records, wage books, tax receipts, rent receipts and profit records, together with the theories of a number of historians and non historian thinkers to contend that the history of Languedoc was "l'histoire immobile" (history that stands still).

== Influences ==
Influenced by the work of his mentor Fernand Braudel Le Roy Ladurie set out to write a histoire totale (total history) of Languedoc from the 15th to the 18th centuries that would integrate political, cultural, economic, social history and environmental history. He acknowledged his debt to Braudel's argument that climate and geography that shaped the course of history, but felt Braudel had gone too far and felt culture and economics were just as important as the nature of the land and the weather.

As well as Braudel he cites other theorists such as Ernest Labrousse, Michel Foucault, David Ricardo, Claude Lévi-Strauss, Thomas Malthus, François Simiand, Sigmund Freud and Max Weber.

== Themes ==
Le Roy Ladurie argued that the history of Languedoc was marked by waves of growth and decline that in essence changed very little over the passage of time.

He proposed that the determining feature of life in Languedoc was the culture of the people who lived there, arguing that the people of Languedoc could not break the cycles of advance and decline not so much because of technological factors, but because of the culture that prevented them from developing more progressive technology and farming practices.

He went against the prevailing Marxist view that dominated French historiography at the time that the history of early modern France from the 15th century to the 18th century was the ever-accelerating accumulation of property and wealthy by capitalists. Instead, Le Roy Ladurie contended that in Languedoc there had been cycles of economic advance and decline from the 15th to the 18th centuries.

== Economic Cycle ==
According to Le Roy Ladurie, there were four stages to the long economic cycle, namely:

=== The low water mark ===
Starting in the 15th century when French society was still recovering from the massive death toll caused by the Black Death of the 14th century which had wiped out much of the population of France. As a consequence, there was social pressure on the survivors to have as many children as possible to repopulate France. With a growing population in the late 14th and 15th centuries, forests were cut down to make room for farms, while poorer land that had been neglected was reclaimed for the growing number of Languedoc peasants. The growing also meant that property was constantly being subdivided while wages declined.

=== Growing Prosperity ===
The first phase in turn led to the second phase, the "advance" of growing prosperity that lasted until 1530. After 1530, Le Roy Ladurie maintained that the "stubborn inelasticity" of farming practices in Languedoc combined with a growing population led to a period of economic decline that lasted for the rest of the 16th century. Le Roy Ladurie wrote that by the end of the 16th century, the "Malthusian curse" had fallen on Languedoc as the substantial population growth was not matched by increased productivity of the land to provide enough food for all the extra mouths.

Peasants planted more grain, but owing to a combination of cultural conservatism, a shortage of capital and a refusal to innovate, could not increase the productivity of the land to match the increasing population. The growing numbers of mouths to feed together with the "stubborn inelasticity" of Languedoc farming methods led a period of social misery with more and more struggling to survive on less and less. Many peasants moved to other provinces in a search of a better life while those that remained in Languedoc tended to get married at a later age in order to limit family size.

=== Maturity ===
Starting in 1600, a third phase that Le Roy Ladurie called "maturity" began. In the 17th century, the productivity of the land in Languedoc finally caught up with the growth in the population. Contrary to the claims of Marxist historians, Le Roy Ladurie argued that there was little accumulation of wealth, as continuing agrarian conservatism and a major increase in what Le Roy Ladurie called "parasitic phenomena" both retarded efforts to build up capital. The "parasitic phenomena" were the increasing taxes levied by the French Crown combined with increased tithes demanded by the Catholic Church and increased rents by landlords. Many Languedoc peasants went deeply into debt in an effort to pay all of these. The adverse climate of the 17th century, in which the Little Ice Age was at its height, together with the fact that France was constantly at war in the 17th century further contributed to the increasing misery of the peasantry of Languedoc.

=== Long period of recession ===
In the second half of the 17th century was what Le Roy Ladurie called the fourth phase of "the long period of recession". As the peasants struggled to pay their loans, taxes, tithes and rents, the economy of Languedoc went into a period of steep decline. This period of rising unemployment and poverty together with poor hygiene, unsanitary living conditions, emigration to other provinces of France, late marriages and a rise in birth control – as many men started to use primitive condoms – all led to a dramatic decline in the population of Languedoc. During this period, many wealthier families were able to embark upon land consolidation as they were able to buy the land of less successful families on the cheap.

== Centrality of Culture ==
At the beginning of the 18th century, Languedoc society was, in Le Roy Ladurie's opinion, not far from where it had been two centuries earlier, thus making this entire period one of "l'historie immobile". Le Roy Ladurie saw this as the result of the inability of the farmers of Languedoc to increase the productivity of the land, writing:

"Some have spoken of a natural ceiling on productive resources. But 'nature' in this case is actually culture; it is the customs, the way of life, the mentality of the people; it is a whole formed by technical knowledge and a system of values, by the means employed and the ends pursued".

Le Roy Ladurie argued that, as a result, the unwillingness of the peasants of Languedoc to engage in technologically innovative farming techniques to increase the productivity of the land (as was happening during the same period in England) was the result of the "lack of the conscience, the culture, the morals, the politics, the education, the reformist spirit, and the unfettered longing for success" that characterized the entire culture of Languedoc during these centuries. However, Le Roy Ladurie pointed out that what he had traced was not a cycle in the proper sense as Languedoc did not return in the 18th century to where it had been in the 15th. Even though this was overall a period of economic stagnation, Le Roy Ladurie noted that were "islands" of growth and change in Languedoc. Some of the more enterprising farmers started to grow silk and vines, the latter laying the foundations of the Languedoc wine industry. Others switched over to cloth manufacture. In conclusion, Le Roy Ladurie argued that these economic changes together with the beginning of elementary schools in which the sons of farmers acquired some literacy, the decline of religious fanaticism and a "a general improvement in behavior" all come together to bring about the "economic takeoff" of the 18th century, when the cycles of decline and advance were finally broken.

In Le Roy Ladurie's view, there were "structures" comprising long-term and slowly changing material and mental patterns which underlined the more dramatic and, in his opinion, less important "conjoncture" of trends and events, upon which historians have traditionally focused. Le Roy Ladurie wrote that what he was exploring in Les paysans de Languedoc was the relationship between the vie culturelle that was the "superstructure" of beliefs, politics and thought as it was changed slowly by the vie matérielle of the environment and geography that was the "base" on which the superstructure rested. Like Braudel, Le Roy Ladurie believes that it is the history of the "structures" that really mattered, but unlike Braudel, Le Roy Ladurie has expressed an interest in biography and the histoire événementielle (history of events), which Braudel dismissed as irrelevant. However, Le Roy Ladurie stated that while studying histoire événementielle is interesting, it is the "structures" of French society that explain the course of French history.

In studying the cultural and religious history of Languedoc, Le Roy Ladurie was very different from many other Annales historians who usually ignored these aspects of history.

=== Religion ===
In the 16th century, ordinary people in Languedoc were all too aware that they were living in very tough times, but Le Roy Ladurie wrote that they were "preoccupied to the point of self-immolation" with religious issues. The Reformation had badly divided ordinary people, and during the French Wars of Religion, Protestants and Catholics fought one another over the social domination of Languedoc society. Between 1562 and 1598, a series of civil wars took place in France between Catholics and Huguenots to determine whether France would be a Catholic or Calvinist nation: Frenchmen went about killing each other with much passion and fury, both sides being convinced that their faith was the one true faith and that France's salvation was literally in the balance. The Reformed Church had made great gains in the south of France, and as a result Languedoc, like many provinces in the south was the scene of especially vicious fighting during the Wars of Religion.

Le Roy Ladurie wrote that the appeal of witchcraft with its glorification of the sensuous pleasures of the human body held out the promise of a "social inversion", which it failed to deliver upon.
