= André Zysberg =

French historian and academic (1947–2024)

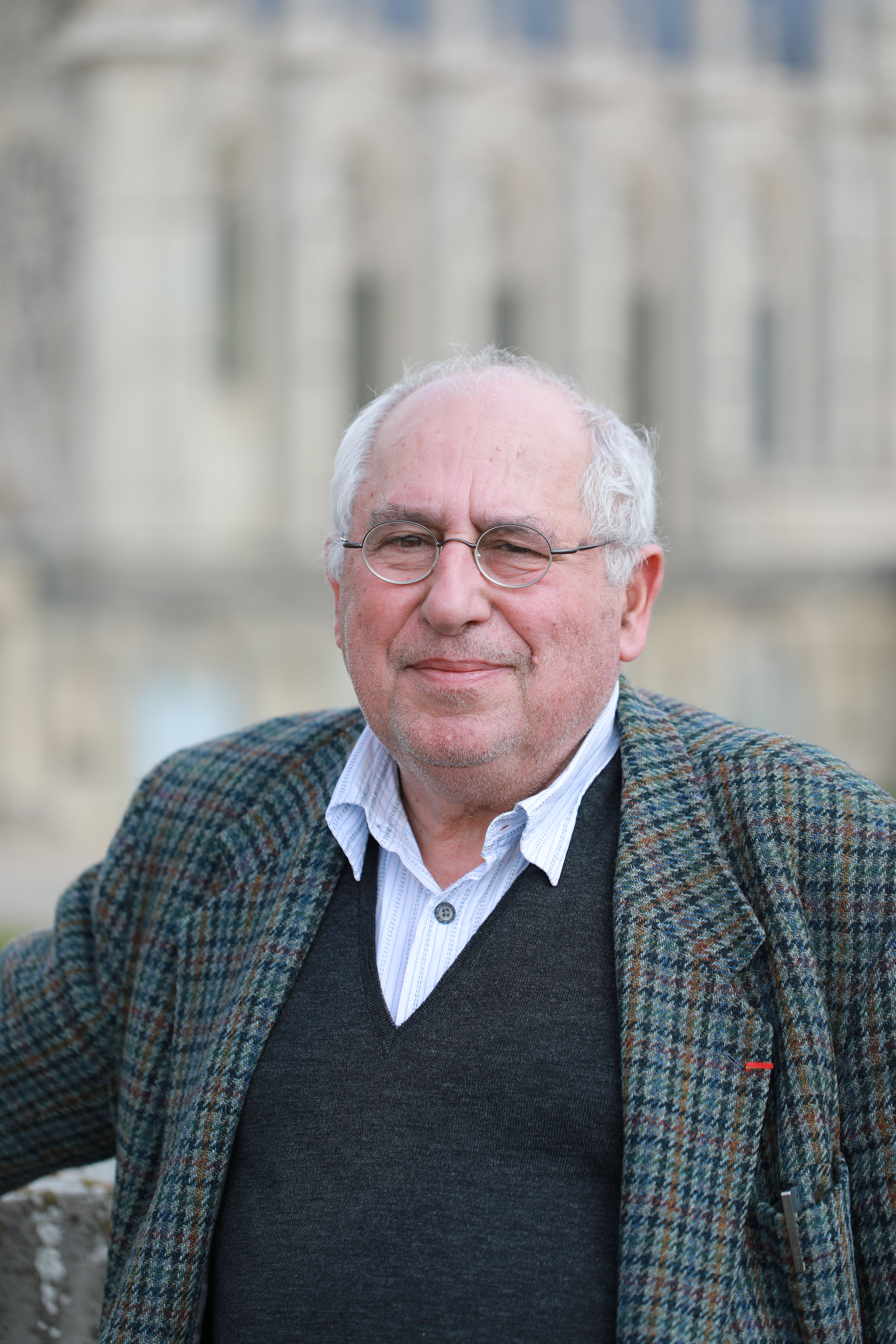
- Zysberg in 2018
- Born: 6 August 1947; Paris, France
- Died: 8 December 2024 (aged 77); Cherbourg-en-Cotentin, France
- Occupation: Historian

Academic background
- Education: Paris-Sorbonne University; School for Advanced Studies in the Social Sciences
- Doctoral advisor: Emmanuel Le Roy Ladurie

André Zysberg (6 August 1947 – 8 December 2024) was a French historian and academic. He specialised in the maritime history of the early modern period.

In 1987, he was invited to the Antenne 2 talk show Apostrophes to discuss his book on galley slaves. In 2017, he appeared in an episode of the France 2 series Secrets d'Histoire covering Ismail Ibn Sharif titled Moulay Ismaïl : le Roi-Soleil des mille et une nuits.

Zysberg died on 8 December 2024, at the age of 77.

== Publications ==
- Les galériens : vies et destins de 60 000 forçats sur les galères de France 1680-1748 (1987)
- Gloire et misère des galères (1988)
- Les Forçats - 1841 (1992)
- L'Essor des marines de guerres européennes - vers 1680-vers 1790 (1996)
- Le bagne de Brest 1749-1800 : naissance d'une institution carcérale au siècle des Lumières (2000)
- Venise La Sérénissime et la mer (2000)
- Marseille au temps des galères (2001)
- Nouvelle histoire de la France moderne. 5. La monarchie des Lumières 1715-1786 (2002)
- Bagnards (2002)
- Histoire des galères, bagnes et prisons en France - XIIIe – XIXe siècle : l'enfermement d'Ancien Régime (2002)
- Depuis l'enfance, matelot : pêqueus et gens de la mé à la Hougue 1820-1870 (2005)
- Salé et ses corsaires, 1666-1727 : un port de course marocain au XVIIe siècle (2007)
- Marseille au temps du Roi-Soleil : la ville, les galères, l'arsenal (2007)
- Kourou-1763 : le dernier rêve de l'Amérique française (2011)
- Les Marins du Roi-Soleil (2023)

== Decorations ==
- Knight of the Legion of Honour
