= Bernard Clergue =

Bernard Clergue was the town bayle of the village of Montaillou in the south of France in the late thirteenth and early fourteenth centuries. A great deal about his life is recorded in the Fournier Register and has been studied by historians, most notably Emmanuel Le Roy Ladurie in his book Montaillou.

== Biography ==
Bernard was a member of the powerful Clergue family, the wealthiest in the village. He was the son of Pons and Mengarde Clergue and the brother of Pierre Clergue. While Pierre became the village priest, and thus the local representative of the church, Bernard became the bayle, the representative of the government. The bayle was the tax collector and the main enforcer of law and order in the town, reporting to the châtelain who ruled to town for the Comté de Foix.

While Bernard was one of the few educated and literate people in the town he was still a peasant and most of his work was farming. As bayle he farmed not only his own land, but also that of the Comté. This included the land seized from Cathar heretics. As with the rest of the family Bernard himself was a staunch Cathar, but was for a long time protected by his wealth and connections.

While not as great a womanizer as his brother Pierre, Bernard did father a child out of wedlock: Mengarde Clergue, who later married Raymond Aymeric of Prades d'Aillon. Bernard later fell deeply in love with Raymonde Belot, whom he married.

== Arrest and death ==
Pierre was the unquestioned leader of the family and Bernard was devastated when he was arrested by the inquisition. Bernard reported that he had lost his "god" and his "ruler". He thus went to great ends to try to free Pierre, including dispensing some 14,000 sous in bribes, a great deal of money at the time.

Bernard himself was arrested by the inquisition in 1324, after a month in prison he died in the summer of that year.
