= François-Léon Clergue =

Venerable François-Léon Clergue O.F.M. Cap.
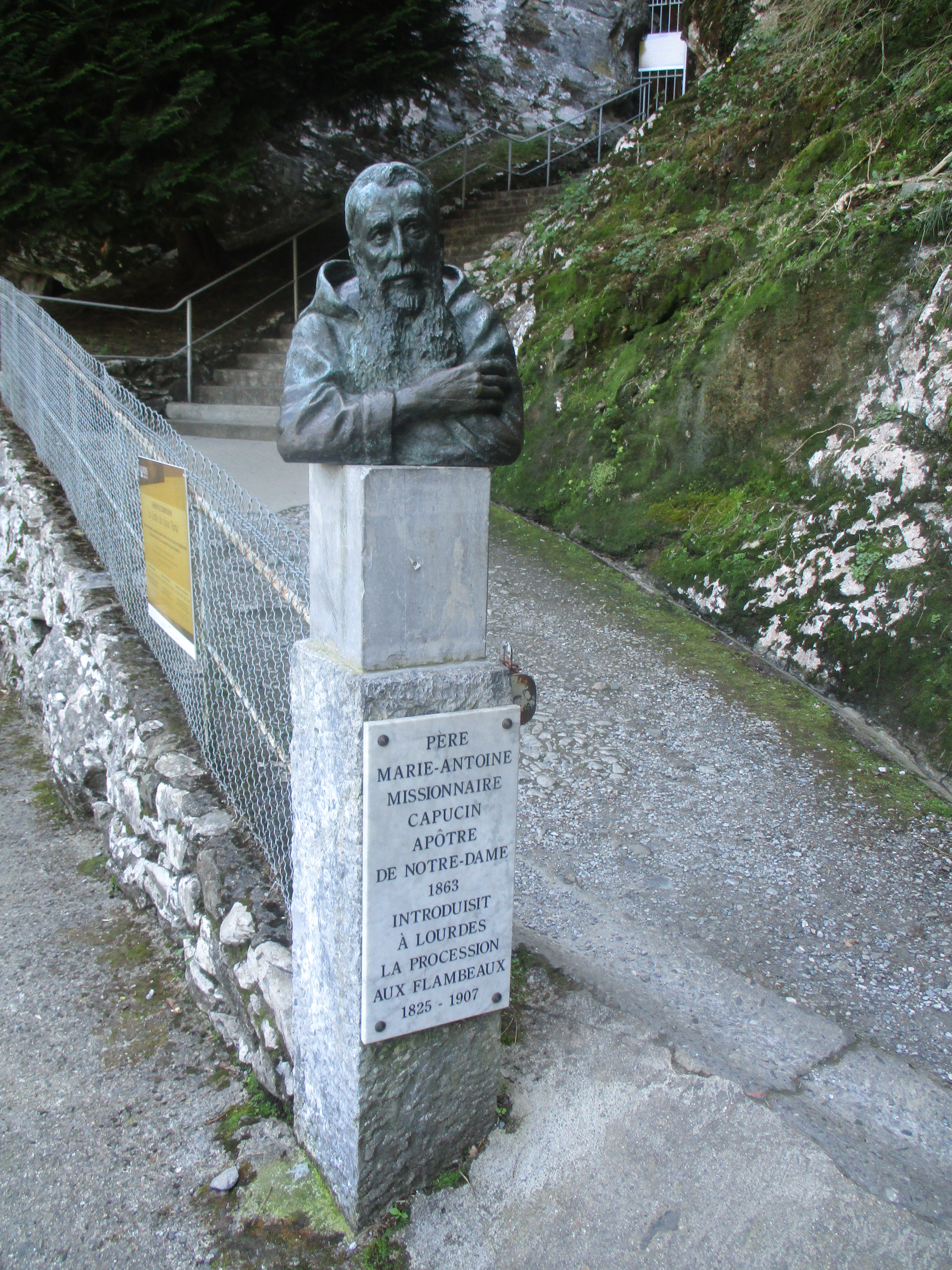
- Bust in Lourdes.

Priest
- Born: 23 December 1825; Lavaur, Tarn, French Kingdom
- Died: 8 February 1907 (aged 81); Toulouse, Tarn, French Third Republic
- Venerated in: Roman Catholic Church
- Attributes: Franciscan habit

François-Léon Clergue (23 December 1825 – 8 February 1907) – in religion Marie-Antoine de Lavaur – was a French Roman Catholic priest and professed member from the Order of Friars Minor Capuchin. He became a popular priest who attracted large crowds when he would preach; he preached around 700 itinerant missions in southern France which would earn him a nickname as the "Apostle of the South". He is also credited with the development of pilgrimages to the shrine in Lourdes where he often visited to preach and to tend to the visiting pilgrims. He was against secularist influences and remained in France in 1880 when religious orders (including his own) were expelled to other European nations; he remained in his deserted convent earning him respect from the authorities who refused to expel him due to his popular rapport with the locals.

His death saw around 50,000 people attend his funeral and his remains were deemed to be incorrupt in late 1935 upon their exhumation. The beatification process launched in Toulouse in the late 1920s and he became titled as a Servant of God. The cause later was stalled in the late 1960s and remained as such until 2005 when an organization was founded to relaunch the cause. The official relaunch came in 2008 and culminated in 2020 when Pope Francis signed a decree that named him as Venerable upon confirmation that he led a life of heroic virtue.

== Life ==
François-Léon Clergue was born in Lavaur on 23 December 1825 as the first of three children to Jean-Louis-François-Frédéric Clergue (1798–1872) and Rose Amilhau (1797–1867); his baptism was celebrated moments after his birth in the names "François-Auguste-Léon. His father – a devout law clerk – consecrated him to the Blessed Mother following his birth. His mother later earned the nickname "La Vendéenne" in 1830 after the riots when she grabbed the revolution's flag from some adolescents parading it around the streets. His brother was Ciprien-Célestin and his sister was Marie Jeanne Mélanie (1833–1872) who both predeceased him. His brother died in Istanbul while in the armed service following the amputation of his right leg.

In his childhood since he was six he desired to enter the priesthood and his piousness was noted to the point where he was sometimes called "the little pope". His mother often considered him to be "hard-headed" but he was otherwise known for being reflective and jovial. He commenced his ecclesial studies in Toulouse with approval from his parents in 1836 and during his time as a seminarian was known to go out in the evenings to evangelize to the homeless out on the streets. Clergue also founded the Brotherhood of the Blessed Sacrament and the Brotherhood of Prisons and later the Brotherhood of Hospitals as forms of an apostolate to minister to all corners of civilian life. In 1838 he made his First Communion before Clergue received the clerical tonsure on 22 May 1840. He received his ordination to the priesthood from the Coadjutor Archbishop of Toulouse Jean-Marie Mioland on 21 September 1850 and Clergue celebrated his first Mass not long after in his hometown's parish church. He was made an assistant priest in the Saint-Gaudens parish not long following his ordination and during that time attempted to look for and preach to farmers who reverted to paganism. Clergue also founded a small group that was dedicated to aiding the poorest people in Saint-Gaudens and he rebuilt the parish's chapel and had the Stations of the Cross (of which he held a high veneration for) built there. He tended to the poor and would provide them with firewood as well as his own mattress since he took to sleeping on the floor as a penitential practice. He tended to the victims of a cholera outbreak in January 1854.

There was an occasion in Saint-Gaudens when he heard the voice of God who told him: "You will be a Capuchin!" It was this push that led Clergue to enter the Order of Friars Minor Capuchin on 27 May 1855 and his novitiate period commenced in Marseille on 1 June 1855; he was vested in the habit and received his new name (which he took in honor of Anthony of Padua) on 13 June (which was his namesake's annual liturgical feast). His parents and his friends opposed this decision but he was set on entering regardless of approval. He made his solemn religious profession on 13 June 1856.

He first met Bernadette Soubirous in Lourdes during his visit there in July 1858 and Clergue would later be associated as the one who contributed the most to the development of pilgrimages to the shrine there. Clergue preached around 97 pilgrimages in Lourdes and also assumed care for them while spending entire nights in the confessional booth. It was due to these things that he became known as the "Stretcher Bearer of Souls" in Lourdes. He became known as the "Apostle of the South" due to his numerous itinerant missions which numbered at around 700. His preaching and his example – in both Lourdes and cities where he preached – saw countless people convert to the faith or from their sins. He was known for walking on foot from town to town with a small backpack and refused newer habits since he preferred his own and wanted to remain as poor as possible. He slept for two or three hours per night on the floor as a penitential practice. These missions that he led would last around three weeks and each time would culminate in the Stations of the Cross; these missions were for the most part conducted in open air settings since his sermons attracted large crowds.

In 1867 he was tasked with establishing the order in Toulouse and he founded a convent there where he would remain for the remainder of his life. He helped to establish the Franciscan Third Order while in Toulouse and he also rendered spiritual support to those soldiers that would fight in the Franco-Prussian War from 1870 to 1871. It was also a highlight for him to prepare children for their First Communion and provided them with the spiritual formation needed for the occasion. He was also a staunch traditionalist and opposed all secularist influences on the Church; he also condemned onanism and defended traditional marriage. Clergue was also a prolific author who wrote over 80 books as well as countless letters and pamphlets to explain the faith better to people; he also is credited with having revived popular devotion to his namesake Anthony of Padua in France.

In mid-1862 he traveled to Rome for the canonization of the 26 Japanese Martyrs and in 1867 again for the canonization of Saint Germaine Cousin. In 1882 he participated in a pilgrimage to the Holy Land and in 1893 paid a visit to Padua to visit the tomb of his namesake Saint Anthony of Padua. In 1900 he participated in the International Congress of the Franciscan Third Order in Rome.

In 1880 the French Government led an anti-clerical campaign that led to the expulsion of religious orders from French borders. These orders were forced to seek shelter in other European nations with Clergue's own order seeking refuge in Spain. He himself decided not to join them and continued to reside at his now-deserted convent. He defended the convent to the point where the authorities did not dare to oppose him due to his reputation and his impact on the local communities. The poor continued to visit him around this time and so he helped them organize soup kitchens.

In early February 1907 he went to visit a priest friend but was stricken with a chill that took quick hold. His condition deteriorated over the next week and he received the final sacraments and prepared for his death since he knew it was imminent. He celebrated his final mass on 4 February despite feeling great fatigue; he confessed on 6 February and received the Viaticum after he renewed his religious profession. On 5 February he fasted despite his colleagues protesting due to his declining health. On 8 February he uttered his last words: "Know that I am going straight to Heaven! Never listen to the Devil. Me, I have never listened to the Devil, so I am going to Heaven!" His breathing became labored after he said these words and Clergue died not too long after at 5:00am. Upon his death the anticlerical local newspaper La Dépêche praised him for his charisma and his apostolate to the poor and to pilgrims. It was estimated that around 50, 000 mourners lined the streets for his funeral procession. His remains were exhumed on 14 November 1935 and were deemed to be incorrupt before being relocated to a chapel for the veneration of the faithful.

== Beatification process ==
The calls for his beatification started soon after his death since local communities started to revere the late priest as a saint. Indeed the Cardinal Archbishop of Toulouse Jules-Géraud Saliège and the Archbishop of Albi Pierre-Célestin Cézerac supported calls for a beatification process to open. It opened in an informative process launched in 1928 and was closed later on 12 August 1949 after documentation and witness interrogatories were compiled. Theologians issued a decree on 28 May 1941 that approved all his spiritual writings after deeming them in line with official doctrine. The formal opening of the cause came under Pope Paul VI on 9 February 1967 and he became titled as a Servant of God. But the cause stalled following this introduction and it remained dormant until 2005 when an organization founded in his honor led to renewed calls for his beatification process to proceed. The Archbishop of Toulouse Robert Le Gall made an official request to the Congregation for the Causes of Saints that the process be renewed; the C.C.S. issued a decree resuming the cause on 4 June 2008. This enabled for Le Gall to conduct a supplementary process that spanned from July 2008 until November 2010. Both processes were deemed valid on 26 March 2013 after the C.C.S. determined the archdiocese adhered to their regulations for conducting causes when it took place and that all documentation was accounted for.

Historians advising the C.C.S. met and voted to approve the cause on 6 June 2017 while nine theologians also issued their approval to it on 9 May 2019. The cardinals and bishops comprising the C.C.S. also issued their final approval on 7 January 2020. Clergue was named as Venerable on 23 January 2020 after Pope Francis signed a decree that acknowledged that Clergue had led a model Christian life of heroic virtue based upon practicing the cardinal and theological virtues on a consistent level.

The beatification depends upon a singular miracle (often a healing that neither medicine nor science can explain) receiving papal approval. One such case was reported and investigated in the diocese it originated in before it was sent to the C.C.S. who validated that process on 11 April 2014. Further investigation into the case was halted until Clergue was named as Venerable; since his naming as such in 2020 the case can be further investigated.

The current postulator for this cause is the Capuchin Carlo Calloni.
