= Cathar yellow cross =

Distinguishing religious mark in Middle Ages France

In the Middle Ages, the Cathar yellow cross was a distinguishing mark worn by repentant Cathars, who were ordered to wear it by the Roman Catholic Church.

== Background ==
Catharism was a religious movement with dualistic and gnostic elements that appeared in the Languedoc region of France around the middle of the 12th century. Cathars were dualist in their beliefs, and the Catholic symbol of the crucifix was, to the Cathars, a negative symbol. In the words of one 14th century Cathar Perfect Pierre Authié:

...just as a man should with an axe break the gallows on which his father was hanged, so you ought to try and break crucifixes, because Christ was suspended from it, albeit only in seeming.

== The Albigensian heresy and the Inquisition ==
The office of the Inquisition was formulated in response to Catharism, and a crusade was ultimately declared against Catharism.

Repentant first offenders (who admitted to having been Cathars), when released on licence by the inquisition were ordered to:

...carry from now on and forever two yellow crosses on all their clothes except their shirts and one arm shall be two palms long while the other transversal arm shall be a palm and a half long and each shall be three digits wide with one to be worn in front on the chest and the other between the shoulders.

In addition they were ordered "...not to move about either inside or outside" their houses and were required to "...redo or renew the crosses if they are torn or are destroyed by age."

At the time these crosses were known locally as "las debanadoras" - which in Occitan literally meant reels or winding machines. It is thought that this name is derived from the fact that the Cathars compared the cross to a reel and line to which the wearer was tied, and by which the wearer could be reeled in at any time, for a second offense meant the death penalty.

=== Montaillou ===
An example of this type of punishment is to be found in the French village of Montaillou, one of the last bastions of the Cathar belief; here the local Bishop and future Pope, Jacques Fournier launched an extensive inquisition which involved dozens of lengthy interviews with the locals, which were all faithfully recorded. When Fournier became Pope he brought the records with him and they remain to this day in the Vatican Library.

Examples of residents from Montaillou being forced to wear the cross include:

- Béatrice de Planisoles
- Raymonde Arsen

== See also ==
- Occitan cross, sometimes incorrectly known as the "Cathar cross"
- Sanbenito, equivalent punishment in the Spanish Inquisition
- Yellow badge
