= Ramón =

Ramón or Ramon may refer to:

== People ==
- Ramón (given name)
- Ramón (surname)
- Ramón (footballer, born 1950), Brazilian forward
- Ramón (footballer, born 1983), Brazilian midfielder
- Ramón (footballer, born 1988), Brazilian midfielder
- Ramón (footballer, born 1990), Brazilian centre-back
- Ramon (footballer, born 1995), Brazilian centre-back
- Ramon (footballer, born 1997), Brazilian midfielder
- Ramon (footballer, born 1998), Brazilian forward
- Ramon (footballer, born 2001), Brazilian left-back
- Ramón (Norwegian singer) (born 1998)
- Ramón (Spanish singer) (born 1985)

=== Stage names ===
- Razor Ramon, a character of professional wrestler Scott Hall
- Masaki Sumitani, professional wrestler known as Razor Ramon HG

== Localities ==
- Ramon, Isabela, a municipality in the Philippines
- Ramon, Russia, an urban-type settlement in Voronezh Oblast
- Ramon Crater, a large natural crater in the Israeli Negev desert

== Other ==
- Ramon Airport, Israel
- Ramón tree, an alternative common name for the Breadnut tree (Brosimum alicastrum)

== See also ==
- Raymond
- Ramone (disambiguation)
