= Consolamentum =

Sacrament of the Cathars

Consolamentum (called heretication by its Catholic opponents) was the unique sacrament of the Cathars. Cathars believed in original sin, and – like Gnostics – believed temporal pleasure to be sinful or unwise. The process of living thus inevitably incurred "regret" that required "consolation" to move nearer to God or to approach heaven. It occurred only twice in a lifetime: upon confirmation in the faith and upon impending death. It was available to both men and women who made a commitment to the faith. Following the ceremony the consoled individual became a "Cathar Perfect" or "Parfait".

According to the Albigenses (Note: The Albigenses were a branch of Cathari located in what later became southern France. The term ‘Albigenses’ is most often used when referring to members of a branch of the Cathari that was less dualistic and more closely resembled orthodoxy.) and other Cathars, the consolamentum was an immersion (or baptism) in the Holy Spirit. It implied reception of all spiritual gifts including absolution from sin, spiritual regeneration, the power to preach, and elevation to a higher plane of perfection.

== The ritual ==
Reference to the Trinity was systematically replaced with the name of Christ since the doctrine of the Albigenses and Cathars professed a modalistic or (in the east) adoptionistic doctrine about God's nature. (Note: The Christology of the Albigenses and Cathars resembled modalistic monarchism in the West and adoptionism in the East.)

The ritual took various forms; some used the entire New Testament scripture whilst others relied on extracts such as the Gospel of John while administering consolation. There were reportedly some remote cases where holy water was used as a cleansing agent during consolamentum being profusely poured over the recipient's head until he/she was completely wet (as opposed to sprinkling).

In contrast to Catholic ceremonies, the form used by the majority of Cathars only required verbal blessings and scriptures administered to the person to be consoled, and did not involve tokens such as consecrated bread or wine, because these would pass through the body and become befouled. Dying persons might abstain from food in order that their body be as pure as possible as it passed into eternity.

According to a few known cases in the latter years of Catharism, the terminally ill would voluntarily undertake a complete fast known as the endura. It was only undertaken when death was clearly inevitable. It was a form of purification and separation from the material world which was controlled by the evil one. They believed that this final sacrifice ensured their reunification with the Good God.

Laying on of hands was always part of the ceremony. Some historians have stated that incidents of ecstatic utterances during consolamentum were glossolalia. This demanded that the rite be guarded even more secretly, since the practice of "speaking in tongues" occurring outside of the Catholic Church was considered witchcraft and punishable by death.

== After the ritual ==
Once consoled, Parfaits were required to be pescatarian, to be celibate, and to dedicate their lives to travelling and teaching Cathar doctrines. These Parfaits were the leaders of the Cathar communities.

The vast majority of believers did not receive consolamentum until on the verge of death. Once given the consolamentum, the same rules applied to them except for not being expected to travel or preach from their deathbed. This allowed most Cathars to live somewhat ordinary lives, and receive consolamentum shortly before dying.
