= Raymon van Emmerik =

Dutch footballer (born 1980)

Personal information
- Full name: Raymon van Emmerik
- Date of birth: 11 June 1980 (age 46)
- Place of birth: Naarden, Netherlands
- Height: 1.78 m (5 ft 10 in)
- Position: Goalkeeper

Youth career
- NVC

Senior career*
Years	Team	Apps	(Gls)
2001–2003	Go Ahead Eagles	29	(0)
2003–2004	FC Kleve	5	(0)
2004–2007	NEC	5	(0)
2007–2013	AFC		
2013–2014 caps 160	De Dijk		
2014–2018	IJsselmeervogels	27	(0)
- * Club domestic league appearances and goals as of 26 August 2017

Raymon van Emmerik (born 11 June 1980) is a Dutch retired footballer.

== Club career ==
Van Emmerik made his debut in professional football, being part of the Go Ahead Eagles squad in the 2001-02 season. He also played for German outfit 1. FC Kleve before joining NEC Nijmegen.

He later moved into amateur football and played for AFC and De Dijk before joining IJsselmeervogels.
