= Montaillou (book) =

1975 book by Emmanuel Le Roy Ladurie

- Cover of the 1975 edition
- Author: Emmanuel Le Roy Ladurie
- Original title: Montaillou, village occitan de 1294 à 1324
- Translator: Barbara Bray
- Subject: Catharism, history from below, Montaillou
- Genre: History, nonfiction
- Published: 1975
- Publisher: Gallimard
- English publication date: 1978

Montaillou ([mɔ̃.ta.ju]; French: Montaillou, village occitan de 1294 à 1324, lit. 'Montaillou, an Occitan Village from 1294 to 1324') is a book by the French historian Emmanuel Le Roy Ladurie first published in 1975. It was first translated into English in 1978 by Barbara Bray, and has been subtitled The Promised Land of Error and Cathars and Catholics in a French Village.

Montaillou was Ladurie's "most important and popular work". Ladurie used the inquisitorial records of Jacques Fournier to reconstruct the lives of the inhabitants of Montaillou in the Ariège (at the time, the county of Foix). The work was part of the historical anthropology of the Annales school.

== Summary ==
Montaillou examines the lives and beliefs of the population of Montaillou, a small village in the Pyrenees with only around 250 inhabitants, at the beginning of the fourteenth century. It is largely based on the Fournier Register, a set of records which contains interviews of the villagers. The interviews were conducted as part of the Inquisition's attempt to suppress the spread of Catharism in the Ariège region from 1318 to 1325, during the reigns of Philip V "the Tall" and Charles IV "the Fair".

The work is in two parts. The first explores the physical world of the inhabitants of Montaillou, telling the stories of Pierre and Bernard Clergue, two of the most powerful men in Montaillou, and the shepherd Pierre Maury. The second explores the beliefs of the residents of Montaillou: what Annales historians called their mentalité.

== Historiography ==
Emmanuel Le Roy Ladurie is most associated with the Annales School in French historiography, and in the English-speaking world he is one of the best-known Annales historians. Montaillou has been described as a work of history from below and as a landmark in this genre. In its use of records of interrogations as its primary source, it has also been seen as having links with oral history. It was also influenced by the work of Claude Lévi-Strauss, the pioneer of structural anthropology.

The book is unusual for its use of a single source, the inquisition register, for so much of the work. It has been considered a precursor to microhistory.

== Reception ==
Montaillou was much more successful than either Ladurie or his publishers had anticipated, selling more than 250,000 copies and being translated into multiple languages. It received praise from professional historians and the general public alike. When the book was published, it was widely described as a masterpiece of social history.

Reviewers considered that Montaillou was "by far one of the finest historical works of the decade", and one of the most remarkable works of French history ever.

However, despite its influence, Ladurie's history has been criticised by many reviewers. Ladurie's use of the Fournier Register has been challenged as being insufficiently critical. Reviewer Cynthia Hay has written about the challenges of using oral evidence, especially oral evidence given many years after the event in question, as a source, despite Ladurie's rejection of the idea that the evidence might not be reliable. Pieter Lagrou argues that "what [the Fournier Register] revealed was trauma and survival strategies when facing persecution, not the longue durée of the peasant mentality." David Herlihy has also criticised the translations of the Register given in Montaillou, which he said were often paraphrased, sometimes misleadingly, rather than direct translations. Susan Stuard criticises Ladurie's treatment of women in Montaillou, accusing him of uncritically accepting medieval conceptions of gender.
