= Cathar Perfect =

Religious leaders of the Cathar movement

Perfect (also known as a Parfait in French or Perfectus in Latin) was the name given by Bernard of Clairvaux to the leaders of the medieval Christian religious movement in southern France and northern Italy commonly referred to as the Cathars. The Perfecti were not clerics in any way, but merely members who had become 'adepts' in the teaching, and whose role was that of aiding other ordinary members achieve the rewards of belief and practice. The term reflects the fact that such a person was seen by the Catholic Church as the "perfect heretic". As "bonhommes" (their term), Perfecti were expected to follow a lifestyle of extreme austerity and renunciation of the world which included abstaining from eating meat and avoiding all sexual contact. They were thus recognized as trans-material (i.e. spiritualized) angels by their followers, the Credentes (Croyant in French, Believers in English). Perfecti were drawn from all walks of life and counted aristocrats, merchants and peasants among their number. Women could also become Perfecti and were known as Parfaites or Perfectae.

== Catharism ==
Catharism itself was a Christian religious movement with dualistic and Gnostic elements that appeared in the Languedoc region of France (Occitania at the time) around the middle of the 12th century. The movement was branded by the Catholic Church as heretical with some authorities denouncing them as not being Christian at all. It existed throughout much of Western Europe (including Aragon and Catalonia in Spain, the Rhineland and Flanders in Northern Europe and Lombardy and Tuscany in Italy), but its focus was in the Languedoc and surrounding areas of what is now southern France. In addition it had links with the similar Christian movement the Bogomils (Friends of God) from the Balkans. The Cathars were ruthlessly suppressed and finally exterminated by the Catholic Church in the 14th century.

The Cathars believed that there were two principal powers in the Universe. One, God, was entirely good and dwelt in a condition of pure Spirit and Light, while the other, Satan(a False God), "the prince of this world" was entirely evil and ruled over the world of Matter, hence their rejection of physical pleasures. This dualism they drew from a particular reading of the Gospels, for example "That which is born of the flesh is flesh; and that which is born of the Spirit is Spirit" (John 3:6). For the Cathars, Christ was an emissary of the Light sent into this world to lead humanity back to God. Each individual contained within them a shard of the Divine Light, the Angelic Soul which was trapped in a "garment" of flesh (the Body) by Satan(a recognized distinction in Gnostic traditions, being separate from Lucifer, another bearer of Light). While confined in this "garment" of matter the Soul would forget its origin with God and instead find itself suffering the privations of this world. Cathars held to a doctrine of Reincarnation, believing that the Soul was doomed to incarnate into this world time and again until through a process of spiritual growth and purification it was able to return to God through Christ and the Holy Spirit. According to the records of the Inquisition, it was believed that this process of death and rebirth towards final Perfection took place over seven lives:

Denying also the Resurrection of the flesh, they invented some unheard of notions, saying, that our souls are those of angelic spirits who, being cast down from heaven by the apostasy of pride, left their glorified bodies in the air; and that these souls themselves, after successively inhabiting seven terrene bodies, of one sort or another, having at length fulfilled their penance, return to those deserted bodies.

Many Perfects chose to become so late in their lives, choosing to abjure their previous existences for their spiritual beliefs. The famous female Perfect Esclarmonde of Foix, for instance, became a Bonne Femme after having reared eight children with her husband, who consented to her choice. Thus, the decision to achieve this state was reached after some experience in the world.

The Cathar Perfect was believed to have reached the point in his or her cycle of incarnations at which the state of spiritual purity had been achieved through which the Holy Spirit could dwell within them, thus releasing them from the burden of reincarnation and the suffering of this world. Their ministry among the Credentes was to help them in their journey through this life and perhaps enable them to move closer to the spiritual state in which they too could return to God. As Perfects they were seen to be "equal unto the angels" and thus already semi-divine by Cathar believers.

== Initiation and lifestyle ==
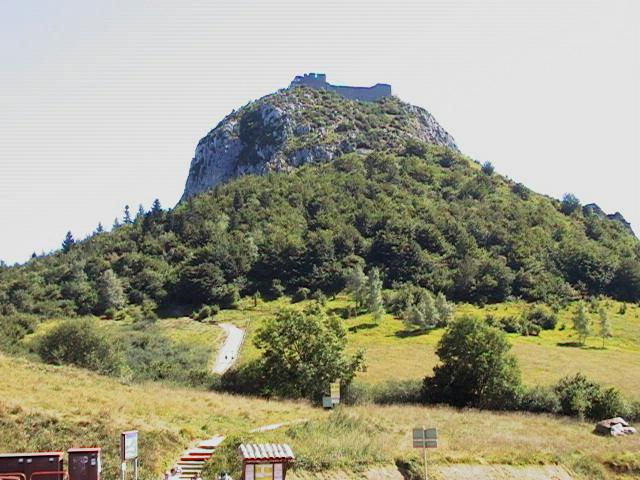
Montségur, where the Cathar elite made their last stand

A Cathar Perfect had to undergo a rigorous training of three years before being inducted as a member of the spiritual elite of the religious movement. This took place during a ceremony in which various Scriptural extracts were quoted, including, most particularly, the opening verses of the Gospel of John. The ceremony was completed by a ritual laying on of hands, or Manisola, as the candidate vowed to abjure the world and accept the Holy Spirit. At this point, the Perfecti believed, the Holy Spirit was able to descend and dwell within the new Perfect—hence the austere lifestyle needed to provide a pure dwelling place for the Spirit. Once in this state of housing the Holy Spirit within themselves, the Perfect were believed to have become "trans-material" or semi-angelic, not yet released from the confines of the body but containing within them an enhanced spirituality which linked them to God even in this world, as expressed in the Gospel of Luke:

But they which shall be accounted worthy to obtain that world and the resurrection from the dead, neither marry, nor are given in marriage: Neither can they die any more: for they are equal unto the angels: and are the children of God, being the children of the resurrection.

Cathar Perfects travelled the Languedoc in twos, in imitation of Christ's instructions to the Apostles in the Gospels (such as Luke 10:1–12). Male and female Perfects always travelled with partners of the same sex to avoid sexual temptation. This prompted their enemies to accuse them of homosexuality. On their travels, Perfects ministered to the Credentes (Believers), the rank and file of Catharism who were not expected to follow the austere lifestyle of the Perfects. They were healers and worked with the sick, sometimes using medicinal remedies, sometimes with laying on of hands. Following the instructions described in the Bible, they walked from place to place and stayed in the houses of Credentes. Services and sacraments were held in people's homes or in places such as fields, forests or caves.

One of their main roles was to administer the Consolamentum (Consolation) to the dying, which ensured admittance of the soul of the deceased to heaven, and normally required a request from the recipient to a Perfect for the Consolamentum. This meant that many Perfects would not administer the Consolamentum to those who were beyond reason or sentient speech, as they clearly would be undisposed to make the necessary request. One of the conditions of being a Credente was the uttering of the Convanenza, or Covenant when encountering a Perfect, which involved the request for the Consolamentum should they be dying. This was aimed at enabling the Perfect to bestow the sacrament to those whose illness meant they could not ask for it. As mentioned above, the Cathars believed in a doctrine of reincarnation, interpreting the idea of Eternal Life promised in the Bible as meaning release from the cycle of successive births in this world, which they believed to be ruled over by Satan. The Consolamentum was thought to purify the soul through the Holy Spirit before death to enable its ascent to Christ.

== Persecution ==
Perfects often took great personal risks to visit the dying and faced certain death if caught. During the time of the Cathar suppression when the Church sent a Crusade to destroy them, many Perfects led a hidden and itinerant existence – moving around under cover of darkness, and spending the days in barns or the woods. Many were burned at the stake by the Church. The last recorded Cathar Perfect was Guillaume Bélibaste who was betrayed by a Credente in the pay of the Church, and burnt to death in the 14th century.

== See also ==
- Antonin Gadal
- Cathar yellow cross
- Catharism
- Credentes
- Montaillou
- Montségur
- Prades Tavernier
- Two by Twos
