= Ramone =

Ramone can refer to:

- Ramones, American punk rock group, or any of its members
  - C. J. Ramone, bassist
  - Dee Dee Ramone (1951–2002), bassist
  - Elvis Ramone, stage name of Clem Burke, drummer
  - Joey Ramone (1951–2001), vocalist and songwriter
  - Johnny Ramone (1948–2004), guitarist
  - Marky Ramone, drummer
  - Richie Ramone, drummer
  - Tommy Ramone, (1949–2014) producer and drummer
- Michael Ramone (born 1961), American politician from Delaware
- Phil Ramone (1941–2013), music producer and composer
- Ramone (Cars), character from the film Cars

== Given name ==
- Ramone McKenzie (born 1990), Jamaican sprinter
- Ramone Moore (born 1989), American basketball player

== See also ==
- Ramón (disambiguation)
