= Pope Benedict XII =

Head of the Catholic Church from 1334 to 1342

- Bishop of Rome
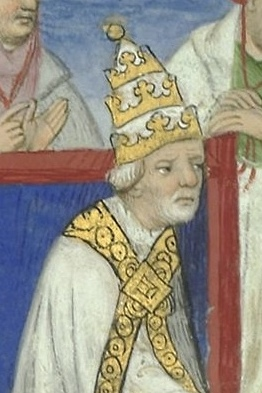
- Miniature of Benedict XII, c. 1410
- Church: Catholic Church
- Papacy began: 30 December 1334
- Papacy ended: 25 April 1342
- Predecessor: John XXII
- Successor: Clement VI

Orders
- Consecration: 1317 by Niccolò Alberti
- Created cardinal: 18 December 1327 by John XXII

Personal details
- Born: Jacques Fournier; 1285 Saverdun, Kingdom of France
- Died: 25 April 1342 (aged 56–57) Avignon, County of Provence
- Coat of arms

Papal styles of Pope Benedict XII
- Reference style: His Holiness
- Spoken style: Your Holiness
- Religious style: Holy Father
- Posthumous style: None

Pope Benedict XII (Latin: Benedictus XII, Italian: Benedetto XII, French: Benoît XII; 1285 – 25 April 1342), born Jacques Fournier, was a cardinal and inquisitor, and later, head of the Catholic Church from 30 December 1334 to his death, in April 1342. He was the third Avignon pope and reformed monastic orders and opposed nepotism. Unable to remove his capital to Rome or Bologna, Benedict started the great palace at Avignon. He settled the beatific vision controversy of Pope John XXII (Note: While John was a proponent of the controversial position during his lifetime, he never promulgated it in any official documents and renounced it prior to his death in 1334.) with the bull Benedictus Deus, which stated that souls may attain the "fullness of the beatific vision" before the Last Judgment. Despite many diplomatic attempts with Emperor Louis IV to resolve their differences, Benedict failed to bring the Holy Roman Empire back under papal dominance. He died 25 April 1342 and was buried in Avignon.

== Early life ==
Jacques Fournier was born in Saverdun in the County of Foix around 1285. He joined the Cistercian Order and studied at the Collège des Bernardins at the University of Paris. In 1311 he was made Abbot of Fontfroide Abbey and quickly became known for his intelligence and organisational ability.

In 1317, Jacques was made Bishop of Pamiers. It was here he undertook rigorous measures against Cathars, assisting Bernard Gui in some investigations. Fournier's investigation captured Guillaume Bélibaste, who was burned at the stake in 1321. Motivated by Philip V's edict against lepers, Jacques also investigated the supposed leper water-poisoning conspiracy and tortured the director of the Pamiers leprosarium, Guillaume Agasse, into giving a confession to the charges.

His efforts against the Cathars of Montaillou in the Ariège were carefully recorded in the Fournier Register, which he took to Rome and deposited in the Vatican Library. His transcription was edited by Jean Duvernoy and has been documented by Emmanuel Le Roy Ladurie's pioneering microhistory, Montaillou, village occitan.

In 1326, upon the successful rooting out of the last – it was believed – Cathars of the south, Jacques was made Bishop of Mirepoix in the Ariège, and, a year later, in 1327, he was made a cardinal.

Upon his elevation to cardinal, Jacques continued to wear his Cistercian cowl, which garnered him the nickname the "white cardinal". He often advised Pope John XXII on doctrinal matters, which included the heretical nature of magic. Jacques was tasked by the pope with examining the works of Peter John Olivi, Meister Eckhart, William of Ockham and Michael of Cesena.

== Election ==
The Conclave opened on 13 December 1334, and it appeared that there might be a quick election. A two-thirds majority were prepared to elect Cardinal Jean-Raymond de Comminges, the Bishop of Porto, if he would only swear in advance to agree not to return the papacy to Rome. Comminges refused to make any promises in order to get elected. The Conclave therefore proposed Jacques Fournier's name, almost as a dare. Owing to his inexperience in politics, it was believed he would not get the votes. Upon Jacques' election the conclave was astonished, while Jacques stated, "You have elected an ignoramus". Jacques Fournier took the name of Benedict XII as the pope on 8 January 1335.

== Papacy ==
From the beginning of his pontificate, Benedict worked to reform the Curia and secular clergy in an effort to curb clerical avarice and nepotism as well as abuses in the granting of benefices. However, the religious orders were the primary target of his major reform efforts. By 1335–1336, Benedict had enacted changes that are viewed as one of the milestones of his pontificate.

=== Emperor Louis IV ===
Following Benedict's election, ambassadors were received from Emperor Louis IV seeking a pardon and an end to the conflict. Benedict, who was entreated by Louis' ambassadors why the emperor should be pardoned, had declared his intentions in favour of Louis. By the end of 1335, however, political manoeuvring by both Philip VI of France and Louis IV, (Note: Louis IV entered into an alliance with Edward III of England.) had pressured Benedict into delaying negotiations.

The interdict placed on the Holy Roman Empire had caused havoc; the rebellion of the archbishop of Mainz (1329–1332), disagreements between the Hospitallers, the Teutonic knights and the Franciscans, while the secular clergy largely defied it. Benedict again received ambassadors from Louis, after German bishops and the Estates of the Empire implored Louis to find a settlement. An agreement was never reached. In response, at Rhens on 16 July 1338, the Estates passed a new declaration giving the Emperor authority over all rights and goods within the Empire without the need of papal approval and that all decrees against Louis by John XXII were "an offense against God" and illegal.

Despite this, Benedict sent his chaplain, Arnaud de Verdale, to entreat with Louis and was assured by the emperor and prince electors of a forthcoming embassy. No ambassadors ever arrived from Louis and Benedict's attempt to restore the Holy Roman Empire to papal supervision came to nothing.

=== Bologna ===
Benedict planned on moving the papacy to Bologna by 1 October 1335. (Note: According to Enrico Castelnuovo and Alessio Monciatti.) He even hired, in August 1335, Jean Poisson to supervise repairs to St. Peter, St. Paul basilicas, and the papal palace in Rome. The cost ran into several thousand florins. Valerie Theis, states the construction in Rome may have been a way of Benedict disguising his true intention of settling permanently in Avignon. Consequently, in 1335, he ordered the construction of the Palais des Papes in Avignon, which was finished under Pope Clement VI.

=== Theological discourse ===
Benedict spent most of his time working on questions of theology. He rejected many of the ideas developed by John XXII. In this regard, he promulgated an apostolic constitution, Benedictus Deus, in 1336. This dogma defined the Church's belief that the souls of the departed go to their eternal reward immediately after death, as opposed to remaining in a state of unconscious existence until the Last Judgment. Though some claim that he campaigned against the Immaculate Conception, this is far from clear.

=== Philip VI of France ===
On 15 January 1336 Benedict requested Philip VI's assistance in bringing about peace in the western Mediterranean, where the crusade was being hampered by conflicts between Aragon and Genoa, Naples and Sicily. This was followed by the pope's letter, two months later, canceling the crusade, citing the belief that Christendom was too crippled by domestic quarrels. On 18 December, Benedict cancelled the six-year tenth crusading tithe.

Though born a Frenchman, Benedict felt no patriotism towards France nor its king, Philip VI. From the start of his papacy, relations between him and Philip were frigid. After being informed of Philip's plan to invade Scotland, Benedict hinted that King Edward III of England would most likely win, regardless. In 1340, Benedict's marshal kidnapped English envoys and handed them over to the French. Using papal sanctions, Benedict secured their release and had the marshal hanged.

=== Italian intervention ===
In 1339, Benedict moved the papal archives from Assisi to Avignon. Unlike his predecessor, he refrained from papal intervention in Italy, issuing a large list of absolutes for Ghibelline cities, including Milan, giving release from interdict and excommunication in exchange for peace. In an effort to secure the acceptance of papal temporal sovereignty in Italy, Benedict negotiated with Azzone Visconti. Azzo was prepared to renounce Louis of Bavaria, but he refused to accept papal rule over Piacenza, Lodi, and Crema, which were Lombard cities. He would never be forgiven for this rejection, and he died while excommunicated. Nevertheless, Luchino Visconti was appointed by Benedict as Azzo's papal vicar for Milan and ruler of Piacenza and Crema after Azzo's death in 1339.

== Death ==
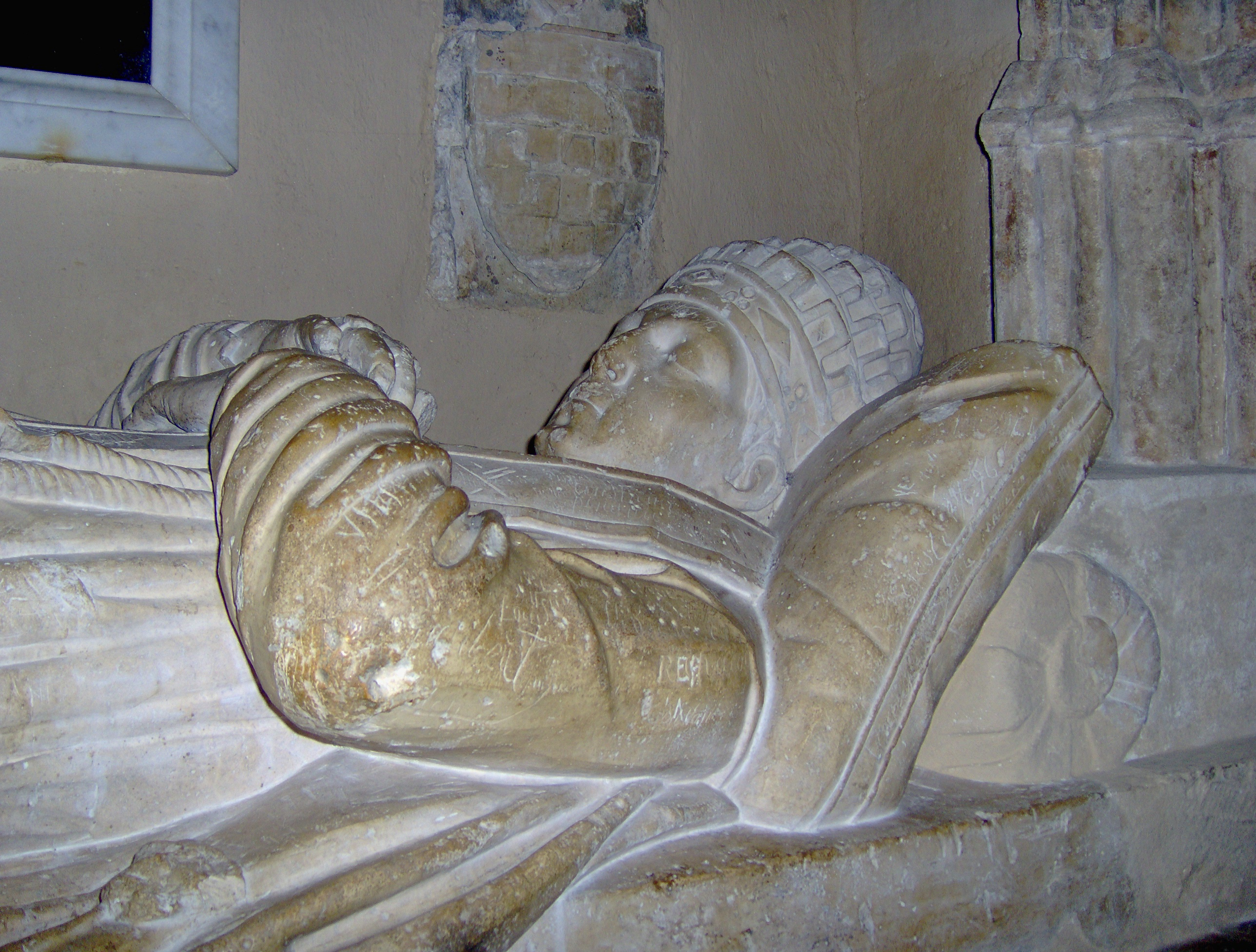
Tomb of Benedict XII, Cathédrale de Notre-Dame-des-Doms, Avignon

Benedict died 25 April 1342, and was buried in Notre-Dame-des-Doms cathedral in Avignon.

== Works ==
- Formulare advocatorum et procuratorum Romane curie et regii parlamenti (in Latin). Venezia: Ottaviano Scoto il giovane. 1536.

== See also ==
- Cardinals created by Benedict XII

== Notes ==
Catholic Church titles
Preceded by John XXII	Pope; 30 December 1334 – 25 April 1342	Succeeded by Clement VI
Preceded by Pilfort de Rabastens	Bishop of Pamiers; 1317 – 1326	Succeeded by Dominique Grenier
