= Fournier Register =

Records from a 14th-century heresy inquisition

The Fournier Register is a set of records from the inquisition into heresy run by Jacques Fournier, Bishop of Pamiers between 1318 and 1325. Fournier was later to become Pope Benedict XII.

== Interrogation ==
Fournier was elected as Bishop of Pamiers in 1317 and began work on an inquisitorial office to uncover heresy in the diocese. The work had previously been carried out by the Dominicans.

Fournier interrogated hundreds of individuals and had transcripts recorded of each interrogation. Fournier also demanded a great deal of detail from those appearing before him. Most of those he interviewed were local peasants and the Fournier register is thus one of the most detailed records of life among medieval peasants. The records have thus frequently been the focus of scholars, most notably Emmanuel Le Roy Ladurie whose pioneering work of microhistory Montaillou is largely based on the material in the register.

His efforts against the Cathars of Montaillou in the Ariège were carefully recorded in the Fournier Register, which he took to Rome and deposited in the Vatican Library.

Prior to Bishop Fournier the local authorities had done little to pursue local heretics, and the region was one of the last areas of France to be home to a significant number of Cathars. Fournier began a rigorous hunt for heretics upon his appointment and set up the new court at Pamiers. He personally supervised almost all of his operations. Fournier only very rarely turned to torture to extract information, and when he did so it was generally under explicit orders from his superiors. The great bulk of his interrogations relied on Fournier's verbal skill at drawing out answers. Ladurie reports the court as conducting 578 interrogations in the 370 days it was in operation.

The severest sentence was to be burnt at the stake, but this was rare, with this inquisition only sentencing five heretics to this fate. More common was to be imprisoned for a time or to be forced to wear a yellow cross on one's back. Other punishments included forced pilgrimages and confiscation of property.

The record was assembled in three stages:

1. During the inquisition itself a scribe would make quick notes in short form to record the conversation.
2. These would then be expanded into full minutes, which were then presented to the accused for review and alterations in case of errors.
3. Finally a final version would be recorded.

The process also involved translating the dialogue from the local Occitan to the Latin of the Church.

== Nonbelievers among the heretics ==
Even though the main focus of Fournier's inquisition work was to find Cathars, he was occasionally confronted with skeptics and nonbelievers.

In 1318, Fournier interrogated Aude from the village of Merviel. Aude had initially expressed doubts about the transubstantiation, and had subsequently also discussed her nonbelief in the existence of God with her husband and aunt. To her husband she said: "Sir, how is it possible that I cannot believe in our Lord?"

And she asked her aunt: "Aunt, what might I do to believe in God, and to believe that the body of Christ is really on the altar?"

Another woman, Guillemette of Ornolac, was brought in for interrogation because she doubted the existence of the soul. She expressed the opinion that what is referred to as the "soul" is nothing more than blood and that death is final. When Fournier asked her if anyone had taught her these ideas, she answered: "No, I thought it over and believed it myself.", despite her disbelief in the soul, she did believe in God, the Virgin Mary, the Resurrection, and that Jesus was God, despite this she was still sentenced to wear a double yellow cross for the rest of her life.

Both women were sentenced to wear a double yellow cross on their backs for the rest of their lives.

An even more outspoken villager who was called in for questioning by Fournier, was Raimond de l'Aire. Witnesses had heard him say that "God never made the world, that the world had always existed, that the resurrection was a myth, that the Eucharist was nothing more than bread and wine, that the rituals of the priests meant nothing, and that he gave to the poor not for his soul but so that others would see him as a good man."

A witness told Fournier that Raimond deserved to be put to death for saying that Christ was not created through divine intervention, but "just through screwing, like everybody else.". Fournier's records however do not mention whether or not Raimond was sentenced to die.

== Fournier becomes Pope ==
After his time in Pamiers, Fournier was rapidly promoted through the ranks of the church eventually rising to Pope as Benedict XII in 1334. The register followed him and was placed in the Vatican Library where it remains to this day. Complete editions of it have been published in Latin and in French, but only portions have been translated into English.

== Sources ==
- Boureau, Alain (2006). Satan the Heretic: The Birth of Demonology in the Medieval West. Translated by Fagan, Teresa Lavender. University of Chicago Press.
- Davies, Norman (1996). Europe: A History. Oxford University Press.
- Emmanuel Le Roy Ladurie: Montaillou, village occitan, 1975, ISBN 0-394-72964-1 (English), ISBN 2-07-032328-5 (French)
- Jacques Fournier: De statu animarum ante generale judicium; De visione Dei – Scan of Vat. lat. 4006 (this is not the Fournier register, but is an original of some of his sermons)
