= Emmanuel Le Roy Ladurie =

French historian (1929–2023)

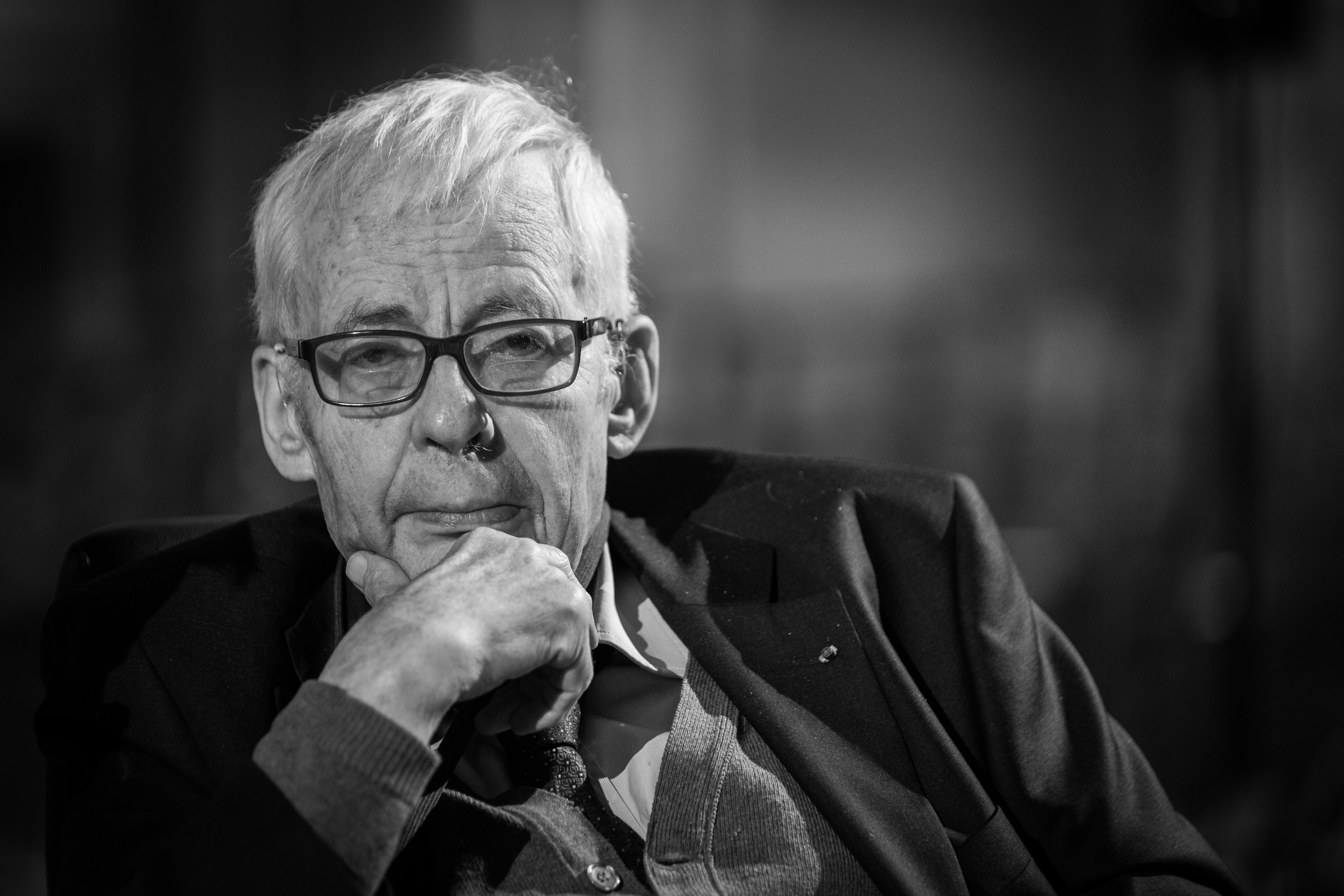
- Le Roy Ladurie in 2014
- Born: Emmanuel Bernard Le Roy Ladurie; 19 July 1929; Les Moutiers-en-Cinglais, Calvados, France
- Died: 22 November 2023 (aged 94); Les-Moutiers-en-Cinglais, Calvados, France
- Father: Jacques Le Roy Ladurie

Academic background
- Education: Lycée Henri-IV; Lycée Lakanal; École Normale Supérieure; University of Paris
- Doctoral advisor: Ernest Labrousse

Academic work
- Discipline: History
- School or tradition: Annales
- Institutions: Collège de France; EHESS
- Doctoral students: Jean-Clément Martin; André Zysberg
- Main interests: History of the Languedoc
- Notable works: Montaillou

Emmanuel Bernard Le Roy Ladurie (French: [emanɥɛl bɛʁnaʁ lə ʁwa ladyʁi]; 19 July 1929 – 22 November 2023) was a French historian whose work was mainly focused upon Languedoc in the Ancien Régime, particularly the history of the peasantry. One of the leading historians of France, Le Roy Ladurie has been called the "standard-bearer" of the third generation of the Annales school and the "rock star of the medievalists", noted for his work in social history.

== Early life and career ==
Le Roy Ladurie was born in Les Moutiers-en-Cinglais, Calvados. His father was Jacques Le Roy Ladurie, who would become minister of Agriculture for Marshal Philippe Pétain and subsequently a member of the French Resistance after breaking with the Vichy regime. Le Roy Ladurie described his childhood in Normandy growing up on his family estate in the countryside as intensely Catholic and royalist in politics. The Le Roy Ladurie family were originally the aristocratic de Roy Laduries, descended from a Catholic priest who fell in love with one of his parishioners, dropped out of the priesthood to marry her and was then ennobled by the Crown; the family dropped the aristocratic de from their surname at the time of the French Revolution. Le Roy Ladurie's grandfather was a French Army officer of Catholic royalist views who was dishonorably discharged from the Army in 1902 for refusing orders from the anti-clerical government to close Catholic schools. Later, the former Captain Le Roy Ladurie returned to rural Normandy, was elected mayor of Villeray and was active in organising a union for rural workers.

During his childhood, Le Roy Ladurie's hero was Marshal Pétain. Marshal Pétain's fall from grace – from the hero of Verdun and one of France's most loved men to the reviled collaborator and one of France's most hated men, sentenced to death for high treason for his collaboration with Germany – had a major influence on Le Roy Ladurie's sense of history. Speaking of the rise and fall of Marshal Pétain from hero to traitor as an example of the vicissitudes of history, Le Roy Ladurie in a 1998 interview stated: "I have remained fascinated since then with what we call decline and fall. France is full of people who became very important, then became nothing. My fascination is probably due to the fact that my own family was once important and then became zero. There was a contrast between my own career and the feelings in my family." Because his father had been a minister in the Vichy government, his son grew up in an atmosphere of family shame and disgrace. The historian was educated in Caen at the Collège Saint-Joseph, in Paris at the Lycée Henri-IV and in Sceaux at the Lycée Lakanal. He was awarded an agrégation in history after studying at the École Normale Supérieure (class of 1949) and a doctorat ès lettres from the University of Paris. Le Roy Ladurie taught at the Lycée de Montpellier, the University of Montpellier, the École Pratique des Hautes Études in Paris, the University of Paris and at the Collège de France, where he occupied from 1973 to 1999 the chair of History of Modern Civilization and became emeritus professor.

Le Roy Ladurie was a member of the French Communist Party (PCF) between 1945 and 1956. His devoutly Catholic parents had expected him to become a Catholic priest and were scandalized that their son should become an ardent Communist and atheist. The Great Depression of the 1930s together with France's defeat in 1940 at the hands of Germany had caused many people in France to lose faith in both capitalism and liberal democracy. The leading role played by the French Communists in the Resistance during the German occupation and the willingness of many of the traditional French elites to support the Vichy regime together with the apparent success achieved by the Soviet regime's planned economy and its "scientific socialism" led Le Roy Ladurie, like many other people of his generation in France, to embrace Communism as the best hope for humanity. The PCF proudly billed themselves as the "party of 75,000 shot"-a reference to the claim that the Germans had shot 75,000 French Communists between 1941 and 1944 (the true figure was actually 10,000); nevertheless the PCF had acquired tremendous prestige in 1940s France as a result of its role in the Resistance. The German occupation had been a profoundly traumatic experience for the French, not the least because unlike World War I, in which the Union sacrée proclaimed by Raymond Poincaré in 1914 had united the left and the right against the common German enemy, World War II had seen a civil war in France. The Resistance had fought not only the Germans, but also the police, gendarmes and the much feared Milice of the Vichy regime. The Milice were a collection of French fascists, gangsters and assorted adventurers used by the Vichy regime to hunt down and murder résistants, who in their turn assassinated members of the Milice. Given this background, in which many young French people had seen at first-hand the pretty streets, avenues and squares of French cities, towns and villages sullied by acts of outrageous cruelty and violence, Le Roy Ladurie described his generation as a scarred one, saying: "It was dangerous for young people during the war. If we are subjected to violence, we will in turn be violent towards others. It is like someone who is sodomised and then sodomises others." Le Roy Ladurie explained that he became a Communist as a reaction to his war-time experiences.

When the Hungarian writer Arthur Koestler's 1940 novel Darkness at Noon was translated into French in 1949, Le Roy Ladurie saw it as confirming the greatness of Stalinism instead of the condemnation that Koestler had intended. Koestler's novel concerned a prominent Soviet Communist and Old Bolshevik named Rubashov who was arrested and charged with crimes against the Soviet Union that he did not commit, but which he willingly confessed to in a show trial after hearing an appeal to Party discipline. The character of Rubashov is generally believed to be modeled by Koestler on Nikolai Bukharin, a prominent Old Bolshevik and the leader of the "rightist" (i.e. moderate) faction in the Communist Party who was shot in 1938 after a show trial in Moscow which Bukharin confessed to a fantastic array of bizarre and improbable charges such as being an agent of foreign powers, sabotage, "wrecking", and working with Leon Trotsky from his exile in Mexico City and the "White Guard" leaders in Paris to overthrow Stalin. Bukharin's real crime had been to oppose Stalin in the post-Lenin succession struggle in the 1920s and to advocate continuing the New Economic Policy - which allocated control of the "commanding heights" of the Soviet economy to the state while allowing free enterprise in the rest of the economy - as a viable model for the future. It was not until 1928 when Stalin brought in the First Five Year Plan that full socialism arrived in the Soviet Union, a policy choice that Bukharin had opposed. The image of the Bukharin-like character Rubashov confessing to crimes that he did not commit in order to uphold the greatness of Communism in Darkness At Noon caused a sensation at the time, but the truth was rather more brutal and sordid: Bukharin had been psychologically "broken" after months of torture by the NKVD, and had been reduced to such a state that he was willing to "confess" to anything. Le Roy Ladurie wrote in a 1949 essay about Darkness At Noon that: "Rubashov was right to sacrifice his life and especially his revolutionary honor so that the best of all possible regimes could be established one day". Le Roy Ladurie was to subsequently admit that he had misunderstood the message of Darkness At Noon. At the height of the Cold War in the early 1950s, Le Roy Ladurie described the atmosphere inside the Party as "une intensité liturgique".

In 1955, Le Roy Ladurie married Madeleine Pupponi with whom he had one son and one daughter. Le Roy Ladurie left the PCF after doubts caused by the 1956 Hungarian Revolution became too much for him. Le Roy Ladurie was later to write that the sight of Soviet tanks crushing the ordinary people of Hungary in 1956 who were merely demanding basic human rights led him to abandon his optimism of the late 1940s that the Soviet Union represented the best hope of humanity and instead led him to the conclusion that communism was an inhumane, totalitarian ideology that oppressed people in the Soviet Union, Hungary and elsewhere. Le Roy Ladurie's break with the PCF did not mean an immediate break with the left: he joined the Socialist Party, running as a Socialist candidate in Montpellier in 1957, winning 2.5% of the vote. In 1963, a disillusioned Le Roy Ladurie left the Socialists.

Le Roy Ladurie has often written for Le Nouvel Observateur, L'Express, and Le Monde newspapers, and appeared on French television (in France, historians have far more social prestige than they do in the English-speaking world; to be a successful historian in France is to be something of a celebrity).

Le Roy Ladurie was a member of both the American Academy of Arts and Sciences (1974) and the American Philosophical Society (1979). He was the first president of the Association Annie Kriegel, founded in 2000 in Saint-Valéry-sur-Somme to commemorate an anti-Communist historian who, like Ladurie, left the PCF following the events of 1956.

Le Roy Ladurie died on 22 November 2023, at the age of 94.

== Les paysans de Languedoc ==
Le Roy Ladurie first attracted attention with his doctoral thesis, Les paysans de Languedoc, which was published as a book in 1966 and translated into English as The Peasants of Languedoc in 1974. In this study of the peasantry of Languedoc over several centuries, Le Roy Ladurie employed a huge range of quantitative information such as tithe records, wage books, tax receipts, rent receipts and profit records, together with the theories of thinkers such as Thomas Malthus to contend that the history of Languedoc was "l'histoire immobile" (history that stands still). He argued that the history of Languedoc was marked by waves of growth and decline that in essence changed very little over the passage of time. Influenced by the work of his mentor Fernand Braudel, Le Roy Ladurie set out to write a histoire totale (total history) of Languedoc from the 15th to the 18th centuries although as well as Braudel's reliance on climate and geography, Ladurie argued that culture and economics also shaped the course of history.

Le Roy Ladurie proposed that the determining feature of life in Languedoc was the culture of the people who lived there, arguing that the people of Languedoc could not break the cycles of advance and decline not so much because of technological factors, but because of the culture that prevented them from developing more progressive technology and farming practices. In Les paysans de Languedoc, Le Roy Ladurie went against the prevailing Marxist view that dominated French historiography at the time that the history of early modern France from the 15th century to the 18th century was the ever-accelerating accumulation of property and wealthy by capitalists. Instead, Le Roy Ladurie contended that in Languedoc there had been cycles of economic advance and decline from the 15th to the 18th centuries. According to Le Roy Ladurie, there were four parts to the long economic cycle starting with "the low water mark" in the 15th century when French society was still recovering from the massive death toll caused by the Black Death which made way for a growing population, leading to a second phase the "advance" of growing prosperity that lasted until 1530, where the growing population hit a ceiling of agricultural productivity leading to a period of economic decline that lasted for the rest of the 16th century and a third phase if "maturity" in the 17th century when Languedoc's agricultural productivity caught up and finally a fourth phase, "the long period of recession".

At the beginning of the 18th century, Languedoc society was, in Le Roy Ladurie's opinion, not far from where it had been two centuries earlier, thus making this entire period one of "l'historie immobile". Le Roy Ladurie saw this as the result of the inability of the farmers of Languedoc to increase the productivity of the land, writing:

"Some have spoken of a natural ceiling on productive resources. But 'nature' in this case is actually culture; it is the customs, the way of life, the mentality of the people; it is a whole formed by technical knowledge and a system of values, by the means employed and the ends pursued".

Le Roy Ladurie argued that, as a result, the unwillingness of the peasants of Languedoc to engage in technologically innovative farming techniques to increase the productivity of the land (as was happening during the same period in England) was the result of the "lack of the conscience, the culture, the morals, the politics, the education, the reformist spirit, and the unfettered longing for success" that characterized the entire culture of Languedoc during these centuries. However, Le Roy Ladurie pointed out that what he had traced was not a cycle in the proper sense as Languedoc did not return in the 18th century to where it had been in the 15th. Even though this was overall a period of economic stagnation, Le Roy Ladurie noted that were "islands" of growth and change in Languedoc. Some of the more enterprising farmers started to grow silk and vines, the latter laying the foundations of the Languedoc wine industry. Others switched over to cloth manufacture. In conclusion, Le Roy Ladurie argued that these economic changes together with the beginning of elementary schools in which the sons of farmers acquired some literacy, the decline of religious fanaticism and "a general improvement in behavior" all come together to bring about the "economic takeoff" of the 18th century, when the cycles of decline and advance were finally broken.

Le Roy Ladurie wrote that what he was exploring in Les paysans de Languedoc was the relationship between the vie culturelle that was the "superstructure" of beliefs, politics and thought as it was changed slowly by the vie matérielle of the environment and geography that was the "base" on which the superstructure rested.

== Montaillou ==
Le Roy Ladurie's best-known work is Montaillou, village occitan de 1294 à 1324 (1975), a study of the village of Montaillou in the region of Languedoc in the south of France during the age of the Cathar heresy. Montaillou was a bestseller in both France and after its translation into English in the United States and Great Britain, and remains Le Roy Ladurie's most popular book by far. As a result of the book, the previously little-known village of Montaillou became a popular tourist destination.

In Montaillou, Le Roy Ladurie used the records of the Inquisition of Jacques Fournier, Bishop of Pamiers, to develop a multi-layered study of life in a small French village over the course of several years. Le Roy Ladurie used the records of interrogations conducted by Fournier to offer a picture of both the material and mental worlds of the inhabitants of Montaillou. Montaillou was much praised by reviewers in both France and the English-speaking world for its vivid, atmospheric recreation of the everyday life of the people of Montaillou in the early 14th century. Many critics have noted that for Le Roy Ladurie, the village priest Father Pierre Clergue, an ardent womanizer whose vow of celibacy meant nothing and who apparently slept with most of the women of Montaillou seemed to be something of a hero for the historian. Clergue's affair with the local aristocrat and noted beauty, the Countess Béatrice de Planisoles formed one of the central stories that Le Roy Ladurie related in Montaillou with much sympathy for the doomed couple.

Critics of Le Roy Ladurie have argued that the Holy Inquisition was an instrument of judicial repression for whom torture or the threat of torture were routine methods. The Canadian historian Norman Cantor argued that none of the people questioned by Fournier had appeared willingly before the Holy Inquisition, and that therefore the Fournier Register which Le Roy Ladurie had used as his main source for Montaillou is not reliable. Other critics have noted that the people questioned by Fournier spoke in Occitan, had their remarks written down in Latin and that Le Roy Ladurie had translated the text into French and have wondered if something has been lost in the translation.

== Resisting the "totalitarian temptation" ==
In France, the intelligentsia has more prestige than does the intelligentsia in the English-speaking world and as such, intellectuals are expected to take stands on the major issues of the day. In January 1978, Le Roy Ladurie was a founding member of the Comité des intellectuals pour l'Europe des libertés (Committee of Intellectuals for a Europe of liberties), an anti-communist group of liberal French intellectuals opposed to the powerful influence of the French Communist Party on French intellectual life and the alliance of the Socialists and the Communists which they saw as a threat to French democracy.

The Comité des intellectuals pour l'Europe des libertés was not a conservative group, and instead was opposed to Communism from a liberal vantage-point, declaring itself opposed to both "the unarticulated cry and pure revolt on one hand and absolute knowledge and totalizing ideology on the other", damning the "fatal socialist-statist equation" as offering the end of the Republic and everything it stood for. In its founding manifesto, the Comité des intellectuals pour l'Europe des libertés declared its intention "to defend the synonymy of these three words: Europe, culture, freedom". Significantly, the committee did not limit its remit to France or even Western Europe, instead proclaiming its intention to defend liberty in all of Europe, Western and Eastern. He analysed his political engagement and communism in Ouverture, société, pouvoir: de l’Édit de Nantes à la chute du communisme (2004) and Les grands procès politiques, ou la pédagogie infernale (2002).

== Carnaval de Romans ==
Another work was Le Carnaval de Romans: de la chandeleur au mercredi des cendres (translated into English as Carnival in Romans) which dealt with the 1580 massacre of about twenty artisans at the annual carnival in the town of Romans-sur-Isère, France. In this book, Le Roy Ladurie used the only two surviving eyewitness accounts of the massacre (one of which was hostile towards to the victims of the massacre by Guérin, the other sympathetic yet often inaccurate by Piémond), together with such information as plague lists and tax lists, to treat the massacre as a microcosm of the political, social and religious conflicts of rural society in the latter half of the 16th century in France. This book provides an example of a micro-historical approach to the social structure of the town of Romans and tax rebellions in early modern France.

== Social history ==
Other more recent treatments of social history by Le Roy Ladurie have included La sorcière de Jasmin (translated into English as Jasmin's Witch) and Le siècle des Platter, 1499-1628 (translated into English as The Beggar and the Professor: A Sixteenth Century Family Drama). In Jasmin's Witch, Le Roy Ladurie followed the lead of Carlo Ginzburg, who argued that the idea of witchcraft as held by peasants was very different from the idea of witchcraft held by judges and churchmen. To understand the "total social fact of witchcraft", Le Roy Ladurie used the 1842 poem Françouneto written by Jacques Boè and based on a traditional French peasant folk tale. Le Roy Ladurie contended that the poem contains many authentic traces of popular beliefs about witchcraft in rural France during the 17th and 18th centuries. Le Roy Ladurie argued that the "crime" of the "witch" Françouneto was the violation of the unwritten social code of "limited wealth", namely that she increased her own wealth at the expense of others. In The Beggar and the Professor, Le Roy Ladurie used the letters and memoirs of the Platter family to examine the social values of the 16th century, especially in regards to religion, medicine, crime, learning, and taxes. Another work of social history by Le Roy Ladurie was his 1982 book Love, Death, and Money in the Pays d'Oc, The French Peasantry: 1450-1660, which as it title indicates examined the views held by French peasants about love, death and money.

== Political history ==
Though best known for his work in "microhistory", Le Roy Ladurie has also examined the political history of France between 1460 and 1774 in a two-volume history. The first volume was L'Etat royal: de Louis XI à Henri IV, 1460-1610 (translated into English as The French Royal State: 1460-1610). In this book, Le Roy Ladurie argued that the major concerns of the French Crown were the economy, the Reformation and aristocratic politics, and that the main reasons for the growth of the French state was the need to raise revenue to pay for military expansion into Italy, Provence and Burgundy and its rivalry with Spain over mastery of western Europe.

In the second volume, Ancien Régime: de Louis XIII à Louis XV, 1610-1774 (translated into English as The Ancien Régime), Le Roy Ladurie argued that there was a close connection between the domestic and foreign policies of the French Crown. In particular, Le Roy Ladurie argued that periods of authoritarianism in domestic policy coincided with periods of aggression in foreign policy, and that periods of liberalism in domestic policy coincided with periods of a pacific foreign policy. In order to pay for war, the French state had to increase taxation to raise the necessary funds. In Ancien Régime France, society was divided into three legal categories; the First Estate (the Catholic Church), the Second Estate (the nobility) and the Third Estate (the commoners). The first two estates, which comprised the wealthier elements of French society, were exempt from taxation and to make up the shortfall in revenue, the Third Estate was taxed more heavily than what would have been the case if the tax burden in French society had been spread with greater equality. Le Roy Ladurie argued that because war was so expensive, the French state always had to drastically increase taxation in times of conflict. And that because of the highly unequal nature of the French tax system, the increased taxes had to be accompanied with increased repression to crush the social resistance generated by the higher taxes. The three men who dominated French politics in the 17th century, namely the Cardinal Richelieu, Cardinal Mazarin and King Louis XIV were all obsessed with winning la gloire (the glory) of making France into the world's greatest power, which meant that the 17th century was a period of constant warfare where France was almost always at war with some other power to win la gloire. As a result, anti-tax revolts frequently broke out all over France in the 17th century as the Third Estate attempted to reject the oppressively heavy taxation needed to pay for the wars intended to win la gloire. All of the anti-tax revolts were crushed with ferocious brutality by the Crown to send the message that it was folly on the part of ordinary people to challenge the might of the French state. Despite certain lapses in the 1750s, Le Roy Ladurie argued that the reign of King Louis XV was characterized by liberalism at home and peace abroad while the rule of Cardinal Richelieu and King Louis XIV was marked by aggression and authoritarianism. At the end of his two-volume history, Le Roy Ladurie stated that the growth of popularity of Enlightenment ideas, anti-clericalism, and liberalism had by 1774 already placed France on the road to the French Revolution. The American historian Stuart Carroll commented that in these books of the 1990s, Le Roy Ladurie was according the decisions individuals and histoire événementielle a level of importance in influencing history that he had rejected in his 1973 book Le Territoire de l'historien where he had claimed the quantitative methodology and the study of long-term structural changes had replaced histoire événementielle and biographies as the main focus of the work of a historian.

== Historiography ==
Ladurie's mentor was Fernand Braudel, a prominent member of the Annales School and one of the most prolific contemporary historians.

At the beginning of the 1970s, Ladurie founded the movement of the "Nouvelle histoire" (New History). Le Roy Ladurie was a leading champion of "microhistory", in which a historian uses the study of an event, locality, family or life to reveal the "structures" which underlie life in the particular period under study. Some, like Niall Ferguson, have questioned the value of "microhistory", arguing that it is wrong to assume that the study of one village or one incident in one town or one family reveals wider patterns of life in France, let alone the rest of Europe. Another line of criticism has centered around Le Roy Ladurie's use of the term "structures". His critics contend that he never clearly defined the term, nor did he explain why "structures" change over time, or even whether the "structures" Le Roy Ladurie purported to find exist.

Le Roy Ladurie also worked on the history of French regions (Histoire de France des régions, 2004) and on anthropometric history as well as on the impact of climate changes on human history. Besides writing books, Le Roy Ladurie was a prolific essayist writing on variety of subjects such as the utility of computers in historical research, rates of delinquency in the French Army in the 19th century, the spread of global diseases, and the belief of French peasants that magic could be used to render others impotent. Le Roy Ladurie is also known as one of the first modern environmental historians because his work focused on human agency in environmental change, as well as environmental factors in human history.

== Works ==
- Les Paysans de Languedoc, Paris, ed. SEVPEN, 1966.
- Histoire du climat depuis l'an mil, Paris, ed. Flammarion, 1967.
- Anthropologie du conscrit français (with J.-P. Aron et al.), Paris, ed. EHESS, 1972.
- Médecins, climat, épidémies (with J.-P. Desaive et al.), Paris, ed. EHESS, 1972.
- Le Territoire de l'historien, Paris, ed. Gallimard, 1973.
- Montaillou, village occitan de 1294 à 1324, Paris, ed. Gallimard, 1975.
- Histoire économique et sociale de la France, Paris, ed. PUF, 1976.
- Le Carnaval de Romans : de la Chandeleur au Mercredi des cendres (1579–1580), Paris, ed. Gallimard, 1979.
- L’Argent, l'amour et la mort en pays d'Oc, Paris, ed. Seuil, 1980.
- La Sorcière de Jasmin, Paris, ed. Seuil, 1980.
- Inventaire des campagnes, Paris, ed. JC Lattès, 1980.
- Histoire de la France urbaine, Paris, ed. JC Lattès, 1981.
- Parmi les historiens, Paris, ed. Seuil, 1983.
- Pierre Prion, scribe, Paris, ed. Gallimard, 1987.
- L’État royal 1460-1610, Paris, ed. Hachette, 1987.
- L'Ancien Régime, 1610-1770, Paris, ed. Hachette, 1991.
- Histoire de la Bibliothèque nationale de France, Paris, ed. Collège de France 1995.
- Le Siècle des Platter, Paris, ed. Fayard, 1997.
- L'Historien, le Chiffre et le Texte, Paris, ed. Fayard, 1997.
- Saint-Simon ou Le système de la Cour, Paris, ed. Fayard, 1997.
- Histoire du Languedoc, Toulouse, ed. Privat, 2000.
- Histoire de France des régions : la périphérie française, des origines à nos jours, Paris, ed. Seuil, 2001.
- Autour de Montaillou, un village occitan : histoire et religiosité d'un village au Moyen Âge, Paris, ed. Hydre, 2001.
- Histoire des paysans français : de la peste noire à la Révolution, Paris, ed. Seuil, 2002.
- Les Grands Procès politiques, Paris, ed. Rocher, 2002.
- La Dîme royale, Paris, ed. Imprimerie nationale, 2002.
- Abrégé d'histoire du climat du Moyen Âge à nos jours (with Anouchka Vasak), Paris, ed. Fayard, 2007.
- Histoire humaine et comparée du climat, Paris, ed. Fayard, 2009.
- Histoire et système (dir.), Paris ed. Le Cerf, 2010.
- Les fluctuations du climat de l'an mil à aujourd'hui, Paris, ed. Fayard, 2011.
- La Civilisation rurale, Paris, ed. Allia, 2012.
- Une vie avec l'histoire. Mémoires, Paris, ed. Tallandier, 2014.
- Les Paysans français d'Ancien Régime, Paris, ed. Seuil, 2015.
- Huit leçons d'histoire, Paris, ed. Fayard, 2016.
- Brève histoire de l'Ancien Régime, Paris, ed. Fayard, 2017.

== Honours and awards ==
=== Honours ===
- Grand Officer of the Legion of Honour (France)
- Grand Cross of the National Order of Merit (France)
- Commander of the Ordre des Arts et des Lettres (France)

=== Prize ===
- Prize Pierre-Lafue (1978)

=== Acknowledgement ===
- Member of the Académie des Sciences Morales et Politiques
- Member of the American Academy of Arts and Sciences
- Member of the Academia Europaea
- Member of the Polish Academy of Sciences
- Member of the Japan Academy
- Member of the Académie de Nîmes
- Foreign honorary member of the National Academy of Sciences

=== Honorary degrees ===
- University of Oxford
- University of Leicester
- Durham University
- University of Leeds
- University of York
- University of Hull
- University of Sussex
- University of Michigan
- University of Pennsylvania
- Carnegie Mellon University
- University at Albany, SUNY
- Université de Montréal
- University of Dublin
- University of Geneva
- HEC Paris
- University of Haifa
