= Montaillou =

Commune in Occitanie, France

- Commune
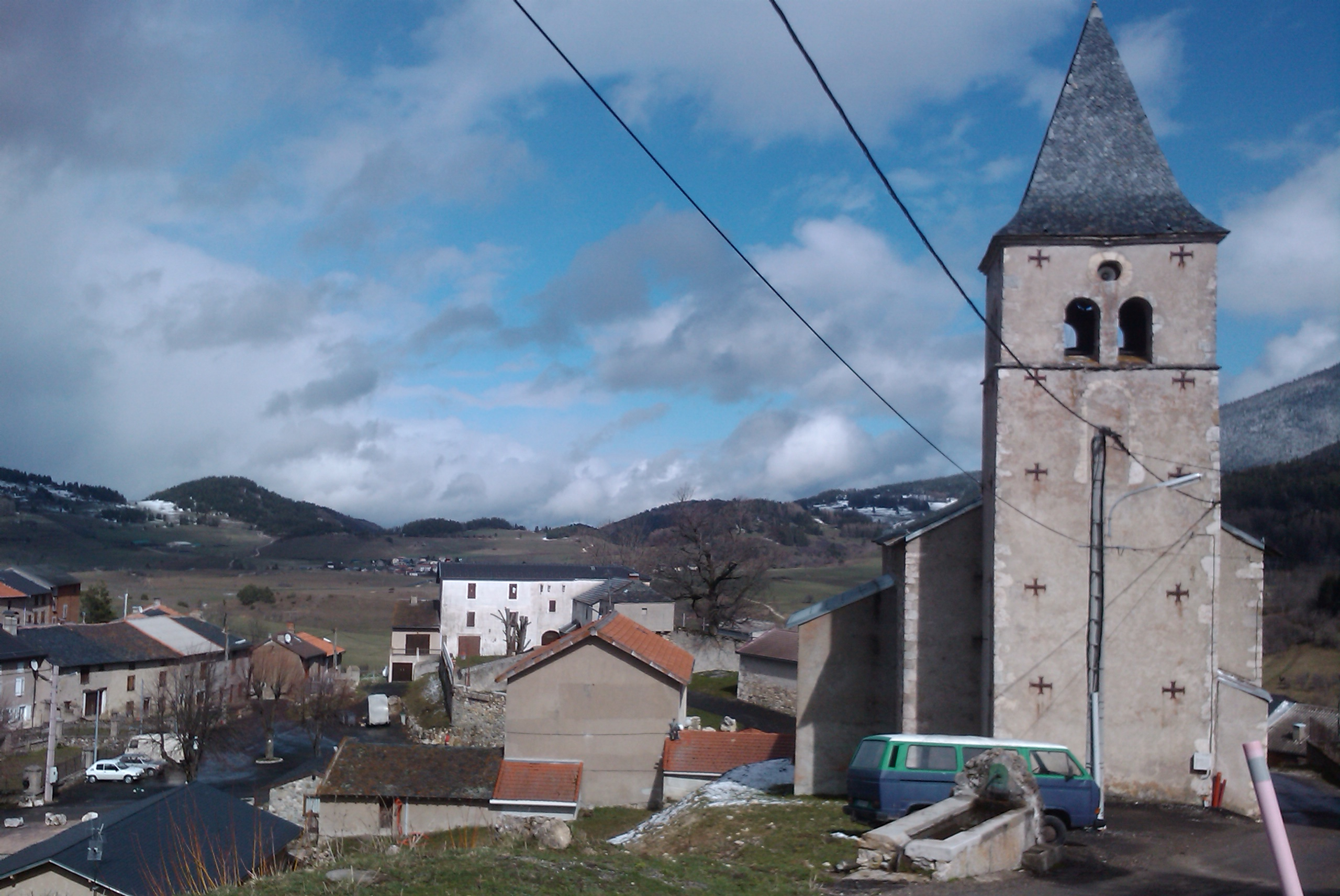
- The church and surroundings in Montaillou
- Location of Montaillou
- Location within France Location within Occitanie
- Coordinates: 42°47′20″N 1°53′56″E
- Country: France
- Region: Occitania
- Department: Ariège
- Arrondissement: Foix
- Canton: Haute-Ariège

Government
  - Mayor (2020–2026): Jean Clergue
- Area^{1}: 8.61 km^{2} (3.32 sq mi)
- Elevation: 1,325 m (4,347 ft)
- Highest elevation: 1,806 m (5,925 ft)
- Lowest elevation: 1,181 m (3,875 ft)
- Population (2023): 21
  - Density: 2.4/km^{2} (6.3/sq mi)
- Demonym: Montaillounais
- Time zone: UTC+01:00 (CET)
  - Summer (DST): UTC+02:00 (CEST)
- INSEE/Postal code: 09197 /09110
- ^{1} French Land Register data, which excludes lakes, ponds, glaciers > 1 km^{2} (0.386 sq mi or 247 acres) and river estuaries.

Montaillou ([mɔ̃.ta.ju]; Occitan: Montalhon) is a commune in the Ariège department in the south of France. Its original, medieval location was abandoned and the current village is a short distance away.

== History ==

The village is best known for being the subject of Emmanuel Le Roy Ladurie's pioneering work of microhistory, Montaillou, village occitan. It analyzes the village in great detail over a thirty-year period from 1294 to 1324. Then a village of some 250 people, the daily routines of the people are in the records of Jacques Fournier, later Pope Benedict XII.

Montaillou was one of the last bastions of Albigensianism, the heresy also known as Catharism. Fournier, then the local bishop, launched an extensive inquisition involving dozens of lengthy interviews with the locals, all of which were faithfully recorded, as well as the arrest of the entire village in 1308. When Fournier became Pope he took the records of the investigation with him and they remain in the Vatican Library.

The medieval village has been abandoned and the modern village is located a short distance downhill. There are visible remains of houses and there are also old tracks and field markings. In medieval times, the old village was guarded by the Château de Montaillou, now a ruin. The village church, dedicated to Notre Dame de Carnesses, remains in use.

== Population ==
Historical population
Year	Pop.	±% p.a.
1968	45	—
1975	37	−2.76%
1982	20	−8.41%
1990	27	+3.82%
1999	14	−7.04%
2007	17	+2.46%
2012	29	+11.27%
2017	17	−10.13%
2023	21	+3.58%
Source: INSEE

== See also ==
- Communes of the Ariège department
