= 1370 conclave =

Election of Catholic Pope Gregory XI

Papal conclave December 1370

Dates and location
- 29–30 December 1370; Palais des Papes, Avignon

Key officials
- Dean: Guy de Boulogne
- Camerlengo: Arnaud Aubert
- Protodeacon: Pierre Roger de Beaufort

Elected pope
- Pierre de Beaufort; Name taken: Gregory XI
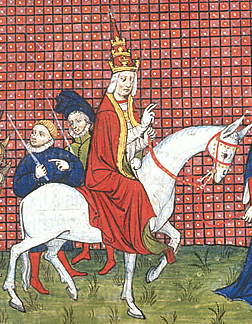

In the papal conclave held on 29 and 30 December 1370, after the death of Pope Urban V, Cardinal Pierre de Beaufort was elected pope under the name Gregory XI. He thus became seventh and the last pope of the period of Avignon Papacy.

== List of participants ==
Urban V died on 20 December 1370, at Avignon. He was the first pope who resided in Rome since 1304, although only for a short time (1367 until the beginning of 1370, when he returned to Avignon). At the time of his death, there were 20 living cardinals. Eighteen of them participated in the conclave:

Elector	Title	Elevated	Elevator	Notes
Guy de Boulogne	Bishop of Porto e Santa Rufina; commendatario of S. Cecilia and S. Crisogono	September 20, 1342	Pope Clement VI	Dean of the Sacred College of Cardinals
Raymond de Canillac, C.R.S.A.	Bishop of Palestrina	December 17, 1350	Pope Clement VI (Cardinal-nephew)	
Guillaume de la Sudrie, O.P.	Bishop of Ostia e Velletri	September 18, 1366	Pope Urban V	
Gilles Aycelin de Montaigu	Bishop of Frascati	September 17, 1361	Pope Innocent VI	
Philippe de Cabassole	Bishop of Sabina	September 22, 1368	Pope Urban V	
Pierre de Monteruc	Priest of S. Anastasia	December 23, 1356	Pope Innocent VI (Cardinal-nephew)	Archpriest of the Sacred College of Cardinals; Vice-Chancellor of the Holy Roman Church
Guillaume de la Jugié	Priest of S. Clemente	September 20, 1342	Pope Clement VI (Cardinal-nephew)	Cardinal-protector of the Order of Franciscans
Jean de Blauzac	Priest of S. Marco	September 17, 1361	Pope Innocent VI	
Guillaume d'Aigrefeuille, O.S.B.	Priest of S. Stefano al Monte Celio	May 12, 1367	Pope Urban V	Camerlengo of the Sacred College of Cardinals
Stephen Langham	Priest of S. Sisto	September 22, 1368	Pope Urban V	
Bernard du Bosquet	Priest of SS. XII Apostoli	September 22, 1368	Pope Urban V	
Jean de Dormans	Priest of SS. IV Coronati	September 22, 1368	Pope Urban V	Chancellor of the Kingdom of France
Etienne de Poissy	Priest of S. Eusebio	September 22, 1368	Pope Urban V	Grand penitentiary
Francesco Tebaldeschi	Priest of S. Sabina	September 22, 1368	Pope Urban V	
Pietro Corsini	Priest of S. Lorenzo in Damaso	June 7, 1370	Pope Urban V	
Pierre Roger de Beaufort (elected Pope Gregory XI)	Deacon of S. Maria Nuova	May 28, 1348	Pope Clement VI (Cardinal-nephew)	Protodeacon of the Sacred College of Cardinals; Archpriest of the patriarchal Lateran Basilica and of the patriarchal Liberian Basilica; Cardinal-protector of the Kingdom of Naples
Rinaldo Orsini	Deacon of S. Adriano	December 17, 1350	Pope Clement VI	Archpriest of the patriarchal Vatican Basilica
Hugues de Saint-Martial	Deacon of S. Maria in Portico	September 17, 1361	Pope Innocent VI	

Nine electors were created by Pope Urban V, five by Clement VI and four by Innocent VI.

Post of the Camerlengo of the Holy Roman Church, the most important during sede vacante, was occupied by Arnaud Aubert, archbishop of Auch and nephew of Pope Innocent VI (but not a Cardinal).

== Absentees ==
Two Cardinals, both created by Urban V, did not participate in this conclave, because they were in Italy:

Elector	Cardinalatial Title	Elevated	Elevator	Notes
Angelic de Grimoard, C.R.S.A.	Bishop of Albano	September 18, 1366	Pope Urban V (Cardinal-nephew)	Papal Vicar in Italy
Pierre d'Estaing, O.S.B.	Priest of S. Maria in Trastevere	June 7, 1370	Pope Urban V (Cardinal-nephew)	Rector of the Duchy of Spoleto

== The election of Pope Gregory XI ==
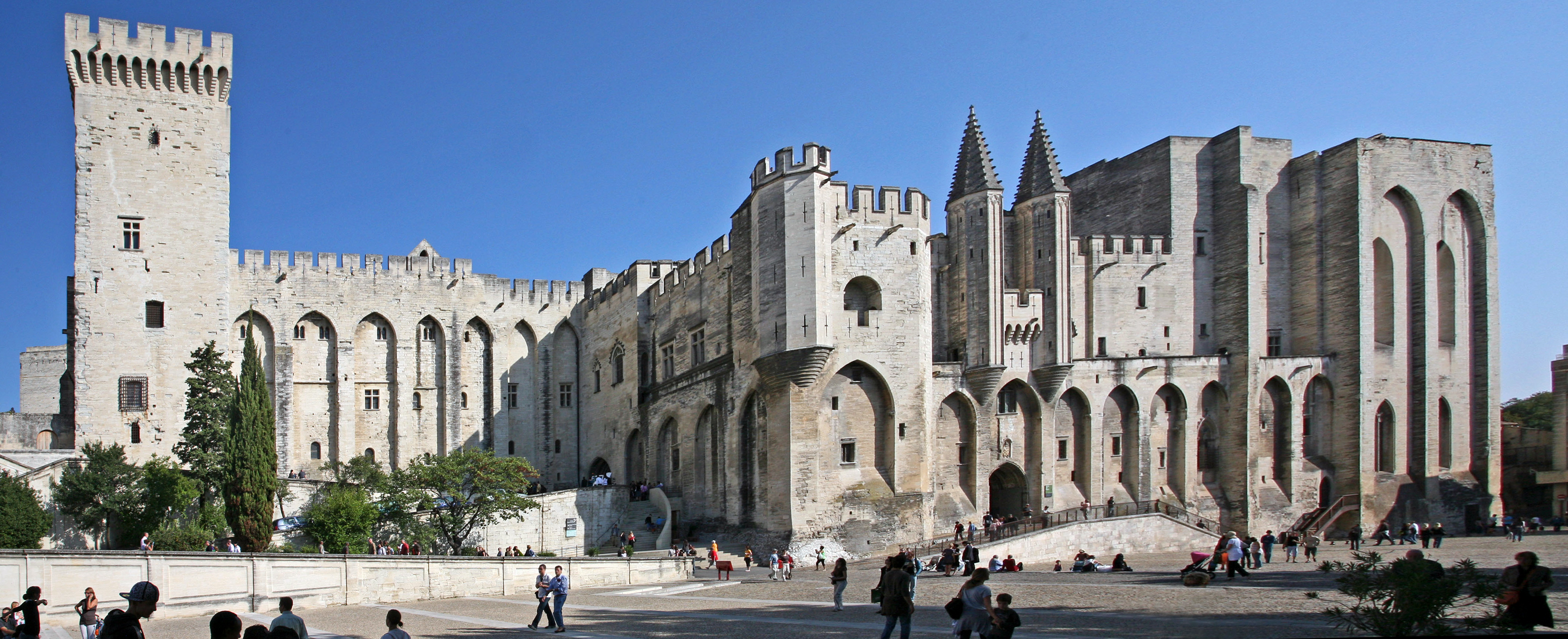
Palais des Papes, Avignon

Eighteen cardinals present in Avignon entered the conclave on December 29. In the first ballot on the next day in the morning Cardinal Pierre Roger de Beaufort, nephew of Clement VI, protodeacon of the Sacred College, was unanimously elected Pope. He initially opposed his election but eventually accepted and took the name of Gregory XI. On January 2, 1371, he was ordained to the priesthood, and on January 3 he was consecrated bishop of Rome by the dean of the College of Cardinals Guy de Boulogne, and crowned by the new protodeacon Rinaldo Orsini in the cathedral Notre Dame des Doms in Avignon.

== Sources ==
- Salvador Miranda: list of participants of the papal conclave of 1370
- Pope Gregory XI
- G. Mollat, The Popes at Avignon 1305-1378, London 1963
