= 1362 conclave =

Election of Catholic Pope Urban V

Papal conclave September–October 1362

Dates and location
- 22 September – 28 October 1362; Palais des Papes, Avignon

Key officials
- Dean: Hélie de Talleyrand
- Sub-dean: Guy de Boulogne
- Protopriest: Hugues Roger
- Protodeacon: Guillaume de la Jugié

Election
- Candidates: Raymond de Canillac; Hugues Roger

Elected pope
- Guillaume de Grimoard; Name taken: Urban V
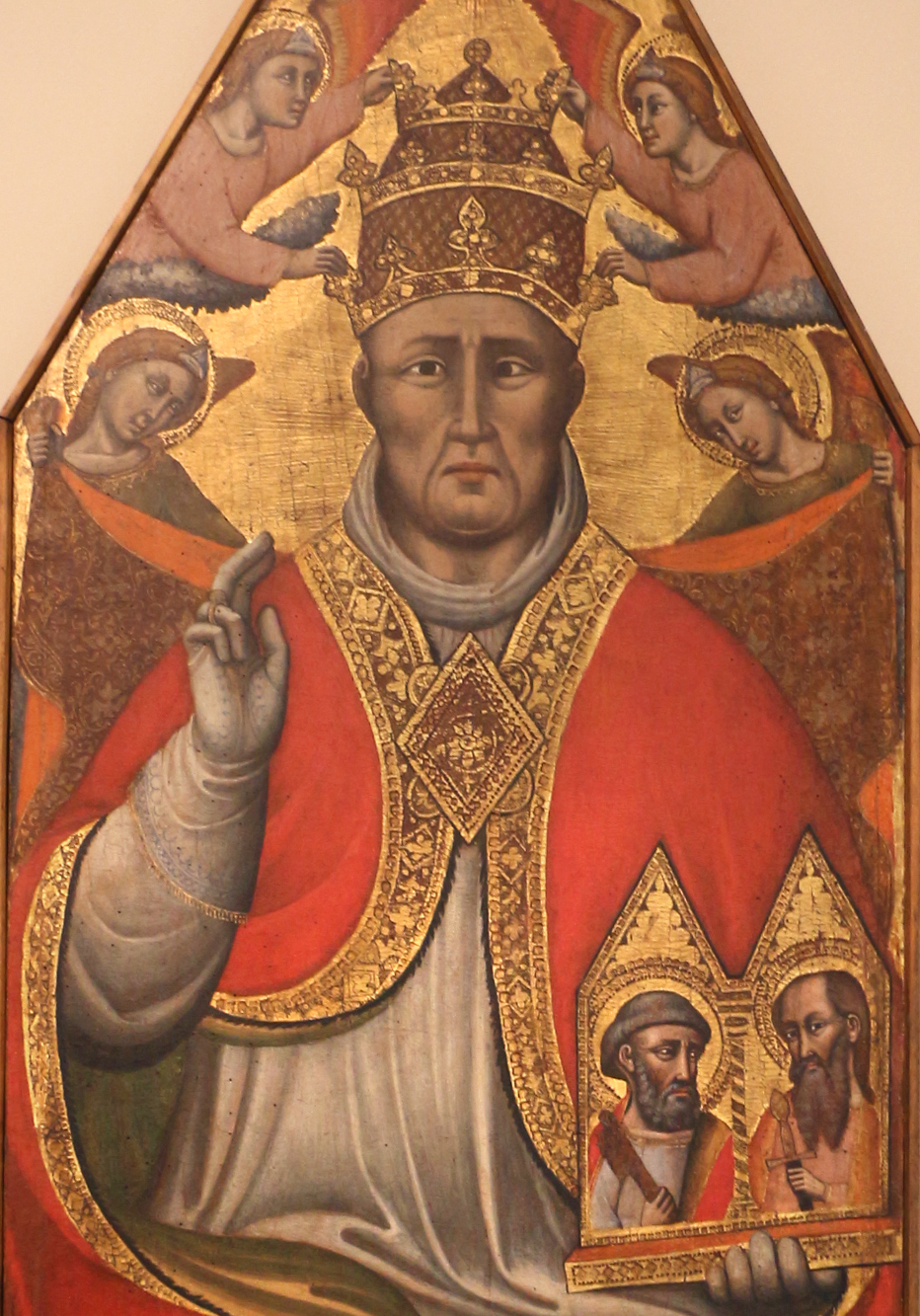

A papal conclave was held between 22 September and 28 October 1362 in the Palais des Papes of Avignon to elect the successor of Pope Innocent VI. Guillaume de Grimoard was elected pope and took the name Urban V.

== Balloting ==
Twenty cardinals entered the conclave on 22 September, divided roughly into the factions of the French and Gascon cardinals (the latter being subjects of the king of England, in his capacity as duke of Aquitaine). Eleven or twelve of the twenty cardinals were Limousin, including three cardinal-nephews of Innocent VI and six nephews of Pope Clement VI.

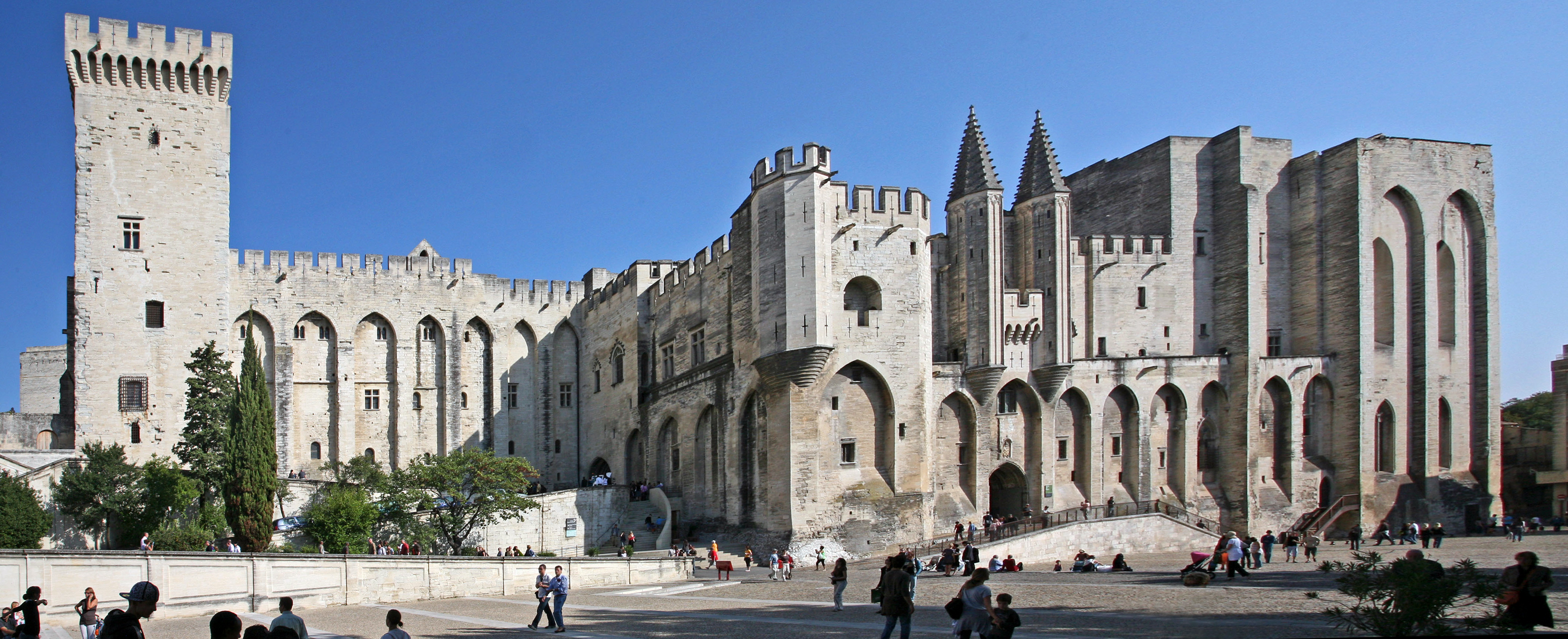
Palais des Papes, Avignon

After six days, the cardinals agreed upon the election of Hugues Roger, a cardinal and nephew of Clement VI, who refused the election in no uncertain terms (unlike many popes who made a show of "refusing" only to accept soon afterwards). Thereafter, cardinal Raymond de Canillac emerged as papabile but was unable to receive the requisite supermajority.

It became clear that none among the cardinals could receive a two-thirds majority, and thus discussion shifted to names outside the college. Disagreements continued until 28 October, when the cardinals agreed on Abbot Guillaume de Grimoard, the apostolic legate to the Kingdom of Naples, at the time residing in Florence. Fearing that Italians wishing to return the papacy to Rome would detain Grimoard, the French cardinals summoned him to Avignon, stating that they wished to consult with him, rather than informing him of his election. It took five weeks for Grimoard to reach Avignon, where he was crowned as Urban V.

Five years after his election, Urban V finally bowed to intense pressure from every direction and did temporarily return the papacy to Rome on 16 October 1367. He returned to Avignon three years later, however, on 26 August 1370. He died in December of that year.

== List of participants ==
Twenty out of twenty one cardinals participated in the conclave:

- Élie de Talleyrand-Périgord (created on 25 May 1331) – Cardinal-Bishop of Albano; Dean of the Sacred College of Cardinals
- Guy de Boulogne (20 September 1342) – Cardinal-Bishop of Porto e Santa Rufina; commendatario of S. Cecilia and S. Crisogono; Subdean of the Sacred College of Cardinals
- Nicola Capocci (17 December 1350) – Cardinal-Bishop of Frascati; archpriest of the Liberian Basilica
- Andouin Aubert (15 February 1353) – Cardinal-Bishop of Ostia e Velletri
- Raymond de Canillac, C.R.S.A. (17 December 1350) – Cardinal-Bishop of Palestrina
- Hugues Roger, O.S.B. (20 September 1342) – Cardinal-Priest of S. Lorenzo in Damaso; Protopriest and Camerlengo of the Sacred College of Cardinals
- Guillaume d'Aigrefeuille, O.S.B. (17 December 1350) – Cardinal-Priest of S. Maria in Trastevere
- Élie de Saint-Irier, O.S.B. (23 December 1356) – Cardinal-Priest of S. Stefano al Monte Celio
- Pierre de Monteruc (23 December 1356) – Cardinal-Priest of S. Anastasia; Vice-Chancellor of the Holy Roman Church
- Pierre Itier (17 September 1361) – Cardinal-Priest of SS. IV Coronati
- Jean de Blauzac (17 September 1361) – Cardinal-Priest of S. Marco
- Gilles Aycelin de Montaigu (17 September 1361) – Cardinal-Priest of SS. Silvestro e Martino
- Androin de la Roche (17 September 1361) – Cardinal-Priest of S. Marcello
- Guillaume de la Jugié (20 September 1342) – Cardinal-Deacon of S. Maria in Cosmedin; Protodeacon
- Nicolas de Besse (27 February 1344) – Cardinal-Deacon of S. Maria in Via Lata
- Pierre Roger de Beaufort (28 May 1348) – Cardinal-Deacon of S. Maria Nuova; archpriest of the Lateran Basilica
- Rinaldo Orsini (17 December 1350) – Cardinal-Deacon of S. Adriano
- Etienne Aubert (17 September 1361) – Cardinal-Deacon of S. Maria in Aquiro
- Guillaume Bragose (17 September 1361) – Cardinal-Deacon of S. Giorgio in Velabro; Grand Penitentiary
- Hugues de Saint-Martial (17 September 1361) – Cardinal-Deacon of S. Maria in Portico

One cardinal was absent in Italy:

- Gil Álvarez de Albornoz (17 December 1350) – Cardinal-Bishop of Sabina; Vicar General of the Papal States
