= Giovanni Orsini =

Giovanni Orsini or John Orsini may refer to:

- John I Orsini (died 1317), count palatine of Cephalonia and Zakynthos
- John II Orsini, despot of Epirus (1323–1335)
- Giovanni Orsini (died 1359), bishop of Padua
- Giovanni Battista Orsini, grand master of the Hospitallers (1467–1476)
- Giambattista Orsini (died 1503), cardinal

== See also ==
- Giovanni Gaetano Orsini (disambiguation)
- Orsini family
