= Nicolò Matafari =

Matafari in the act of writing, from a copy of his Thesaurus

Nicolò Matafari (died 1367) was the archbishop of Zadar (Zara) in the Kingdom of Hungary from 1333 until his death. When his city came under the control of the Republic of Venice in 1346, he went into exile until 1358. A native of Zadar and a lawyer by training, Matafari was appointed the vicar general of the diocese of Padua in 1320, 1345 and 1355. He also served as vicar of the diocese of Castello in 1331.

Matafari was one of the most prominent Zaratine intellectuals of his time. In 1346–1351, he wrote the Thesaurus pontificum, a manual for the clergy that discusses a wide variety of liturgical duties.

== Life ==
Nicolò Matafari was the son of Guido Matafari. He was born at Zadar towards the end of the 13th century. He had a brother, Demetrio, who became bishop of Pićan (Pedena) in 1348. His early education was with either the Franciscans or Dominicans. In 1312–1313, he studied canon law under Giovanni d'Andrea at the University of Bologna. He may also have studied at the University of Padua. By 1320, he had received his doctorate and taken minor orders. A document of that time calls him a doctor decretorum (doctor of canon law), but later sources call him a doctor of both laws.

In 1320, Matafari was appointed vicar general of the diocese of Padua by Bishop Ildebrandino Conti, who was staying at the Avignonese curia. By 1330, he had been granted a canonry in the diocese of Várad in Hungary. According to the historian Daniele Farlati, he was the vicar of the diocese of Nona from 1330 to 1333, but this seems unlikely. On 30 October 1331, he was the vicar of the diocese of Castello for Bishop Angelo Dolfin and was living in Venice. On 10 September 1333, on the recommendation of Cardinal Bertrand du Poujet, he was appointed archbishop of Zadar by Pope John XXII.

As archbishop, Matafari held a local synod to resolve a dispute between the clergy of Zadar and those of Rab. Politically, he was a Guelph and a Hungarophile. He supported the ambitions of King Louis I of Hungary and the autonomy of Zadar against the Republic of Venice. In August 1345, he went to Venice on Louis's behalf to negotiate Venetian recognition of Hungary's lordship over the Dalmatian coast, but the mission failed and Venice besieged Zadar. When the city capitulated to Venice on 21 December 1346, Matafari went into exile.

Matafari spent his exile mostly in Padua, where he is recorded from 1346 until 1350 and again from 1354 to 1356. He may have made an unrecorded trip to Hungary. He was re-appointed vicar by Bishop Ildebrandino in advance of his exile in May 1345. On 15 February 1350, he was present for the translation of the body of Saint Anthony of Padua to the new basilica for reburial. Also present were Bishop Ildebrandino, Cardinal Bertrand, Cardinal Guy of Boulogne, Bishop Giovanni of Verona and Petrarch. It is possible that the "Dalmatian, accustomed to a different environment and style" mentioned in one of Petrarch's Familiar Letters was Matafari.

While Matafari was in exile, Venice asked Pope Clement VI to transfer him to a different see so that a pro-Venetian bishop could be installed in Zadar. Clement refused. In the archbishop's absence, the diocese was governed by vicars. In 1351 and again in December 1357, Matafari's brother Demetrio was the vicar, indicating that he was probably still able to exercise some control over diocesan affairs.

In exile, Matafari associated with the canonists of the University of Padua. In March 1355, he was present along with Raniero and Argentino Arsendi when a doctorate in civil law was conferred on Antonio Ardizzoni of Alessandria. His name is on the diploma in medicine granted to Giovanni da Montegaldella on 12 April. At that time, he was once again acting as vicar of the diocese of Padua, this time for Bishop Giovanni Orsini.

Matafari's later years are poorly recorded. He was able to return to Zadar in 1358. He died there in 1367 and was buried in Zadar Cathedral. In 1376, his nephew Pietro Matafari became archbishop.

== Works ==
Table of contents in a 14th-century copy of the Thesaurus pontificum

Matafari was one of the most prominent Zaratine intellectuals of his time. Between 1346 and 1351, he wrote the Thesaurus pontificum (or pontificalis), a liturgical manual for the clergy. It is his only known work. Probably written at the instigation of Ildebrandino, it was dedicated to Cardinal Bertrand. It is divided into a prologue and five parts of 14, 29, 8, 12 and 17 chapters, respectively. The first part concerns the ecclesiastical hierarchy; the second the consecration of altars, cemeteries, etc.; the third the celebration of feasts, weddings, etc.; the fourth the holding of synods and the liturgy of the hours; and the fifth the sacraments.

Matafari's patristic sources include Ambrose, Augustine, Jerome and Gregory the Great. His canon law sources are Burchard of Worms, the Decretum Gratiani, the Decretals of Gregory IX, the Liber Sextus and the Constitutiones Clementinae. He also used the Roman Pontifical, the Glossa Ordinaria, the Corpus Juris Civilis and the writings of Guillaume Durand.

Thesaurus pontificalis was first printed at Paris around 1521–1522 by Durand Gerlier. Its Latin text has twice been edited in modern times.

Matafari may also be the author of the Libri duo obsidionis jadrensis, an account of the Venetian siege of 1345.

== Bibliography ==
- Bianchi, C. F., ed. (1881). Nicolò de Matafari, arcivescovo di Zara, ed i suoi scritti. G. Woditzka.
- Bernardo, Aldo S., ed. (2005) [1982]. Letters on Familiar Matters (Rerum familiarium libri). Vol. 2: Books IX–XVI. Italica Press.
- Elze, Reinhard [in German], ed. (1956). "Des Thesaurus pontificum des Erzbischofs Nicolaus von Zara" (PDF). Revue des sciences religieuses. Mélanges en l'honneur de Monseigneur Michel Andrieu: 143–160.
- Krekić, Bariša (1995). "On the Latino-Slavic Cultural Symbiosis in Late Medieval and Renaissance Dalmatia and Dubrovnik". Viator. 26: 321–332. doi:10.1484/j.viator.2.301146.
- Labardi, Andrea (2009). "Matafari, Nicolò". Dizionario Biografico degli Italiani, Volume 72: Massimo–Mechetti (in Italian). Rome: Istituto dell'Enciclopedia Italiana. ISBN 978-8-81200032-6.
- Petrović, Mišo (2021). The Development of the Episcopal Office in Medieval Croatia–Dalmatia: The Cases of Split, Trogir and Zadar (1270–1420) (PDF) (Doctoral dissertation). Central European University.
