= Ildebrandino Conti =

Catholic bishop of Padua (1319-1352)

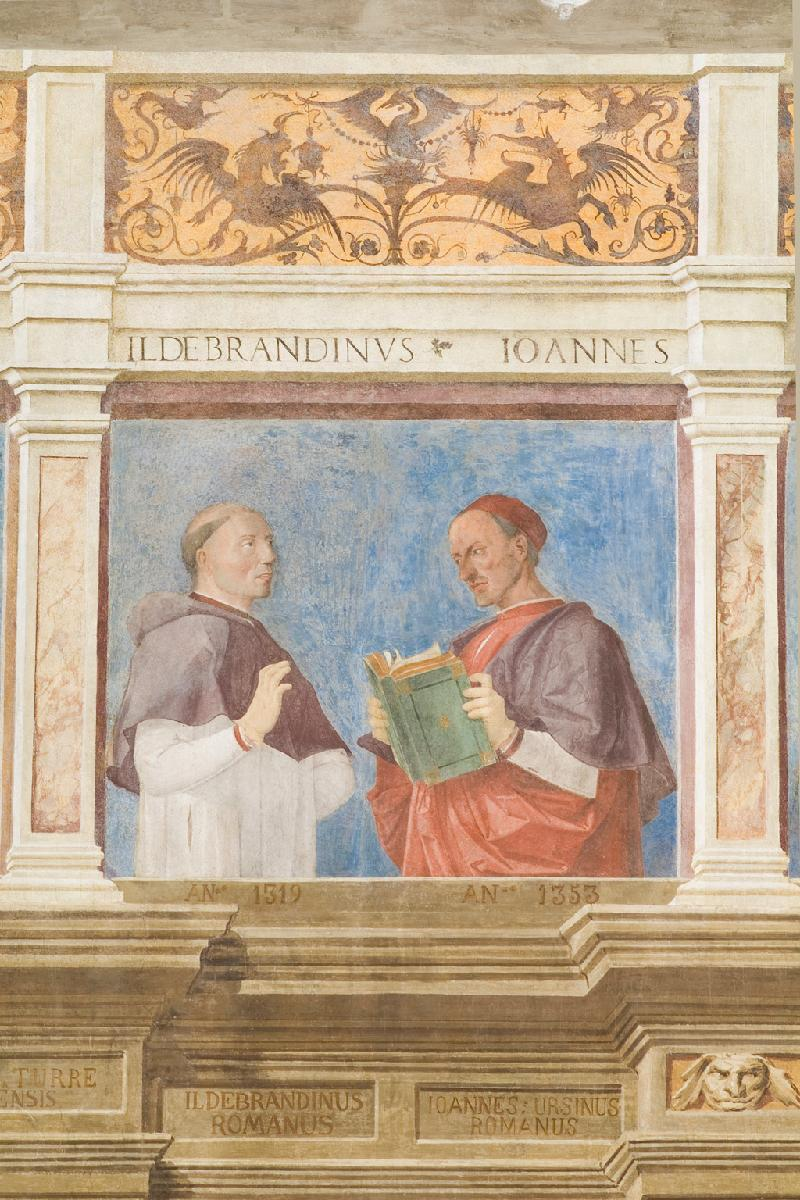
Ildebrandino (left) and his successor as bishop, Giovanni Orsini, in a mural by Bartolomeo Montagna now in the diocesan museum of Padua

Ildebrandino Conti (c. 1280 – 2 November 1352) was a Roman nobleman and Catholic prelate who served as the bishop of Padua from 1319 until his death.

Conti largely governed Padua in absentia. He served the papacy in Avignon from 1310 until 1332. He was in Padua in 1332–1333, 1336 and 1339–1343, but it only became his permanent residence after 1347. In the period of 1343–1347, he worked mainly as a papal diplomat, travelling to Perpignan, Genoa, Milan and Naples. He was in Rome during the government of Cola di Rienzo, which he describes in a letter. During his final five years, he undertook two more diplomatic missions, to Hungary in 1349 and Venice in 1350. He attended the jubilee in Rome in 1350.

In his final years, Conti was a friend of the humanist Petrarch, to whom he gave a canonry in Padua. Two of Petrarch's letters to him survive, as does Petrarch's letter of consolation on his death.

== Life ==
=== Family and inheritance ===
Ildebrandino was a member of the Conti di Segni family of the Roman nobility, born towards 1280 in Valmontone to Adenolfo di Giovanni and Paola Orsi. He had an older brother named Giovanni and two other brothers, Paolo and Pietro. Their grandfather left their father extensive lands in Valmontone, Gavignano, Sacchi, Paliano, Ienne and Segni in 1287. The three younger brothers all entered the church and moved to France, Ildebrandino becoming a canon in Sens, Pietro in Reims and Paolo in Chartres.

When Adenolfo died in 1301, Giovanni inherited the main lands in Valmontone, while other lands were shared between the younger brothers. In 1307, he and his brothers won a lawsuit, acquiring further rights Gavignano. In 1309, he acquired more property from a relative for 200 florins.

=== Papal service ===
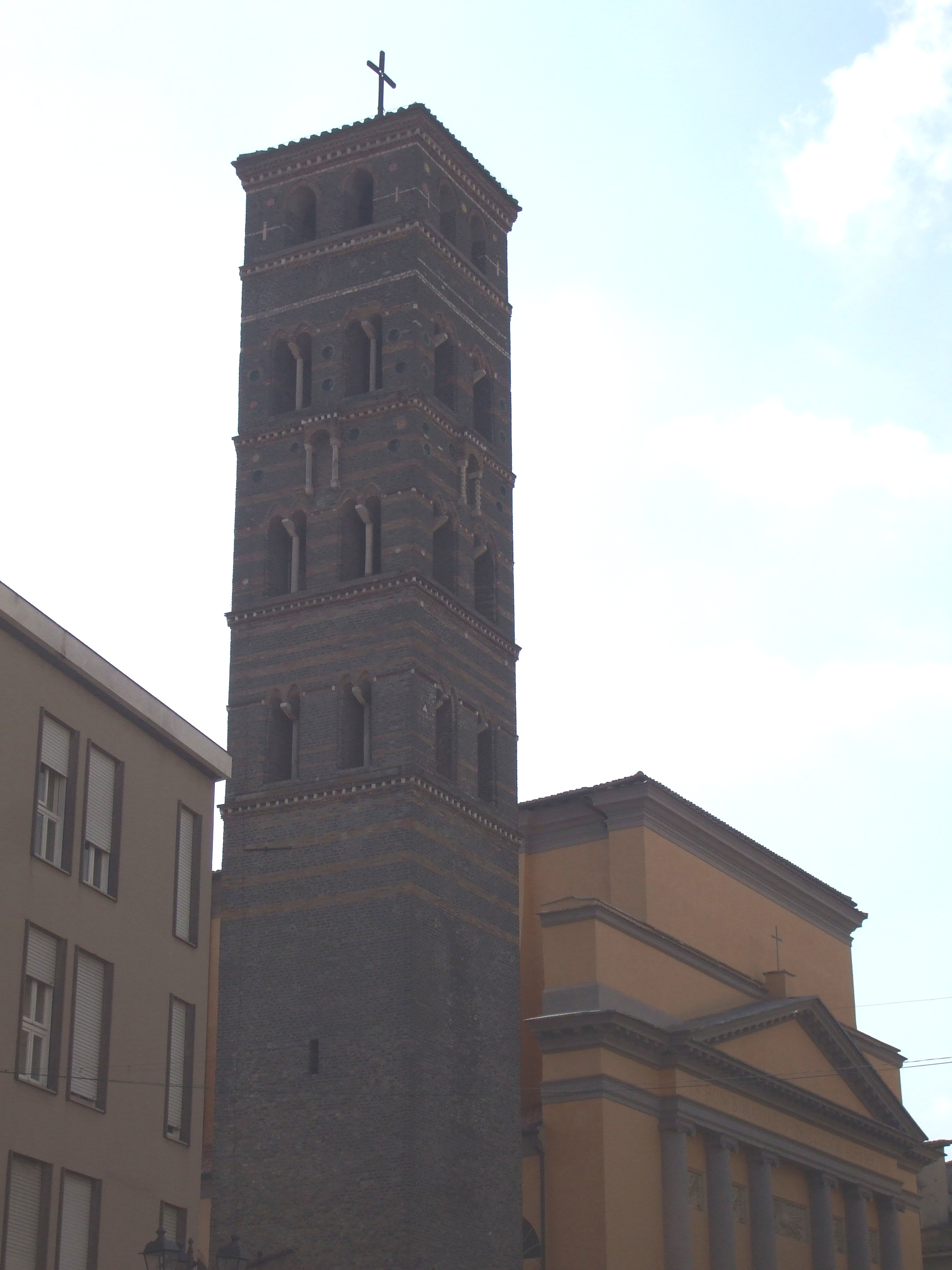
Tower of the Santa Maria del Trivio in Velletri, where Conti held a canonry

By 1306, Conti had acquired canonries in Saint-Omer, Velletri and Valmontone. On 19 February 1306, Pope Clement V granted him one in the diocese of Capua. On 29 November 1310, he granted him a canonry in Avignon. Thereafter, Conti resided in Avignon. On 29 June 1319, he was appointed bishop of Padua by Pope John XXII. Nevertheless, he remained in Avignon and administered his diocese through vicars until 1332. He was present when the Antipope Nicholas V confessed on 25 August 1330. He may have first met Petrarch in Avignon in 1326.

=== Episcopal government ===
Conti usually appointed two vicars to Padua at a time, one for spiritual affairs and another for temporal. He appointed a total of 23 vicars during his episcopate. His first visit to Padua took place between 9 November 1332 and August 1333. He reformed the Benedictine house of San Pietro Apostolo and promulgated new regulations for the cathedral chapter. He returned briefly to Padua in the spring of 1336 to complete the reform of San Pietro. His third visit to Padua began on 15 January 1339 and lasted several years.

Conti's first order of business in Padua was to repair the damage done by the Scaliger War of 1336–1339. He convoked a diocesan synod for April 1339 to reform the economic basis of the religious houses in Padua and to fight usury and simony. In the fall, he approved the establishment of a Camaldolese house on Monte Rua.

=== Papal diplomat ===
Conti returned to Avignon in early 1343. He remained in papal service and away from Padua until 1347. On 1 February, he departed with Cardinal Andrea Ghilini on a diplomatic mission to resolve the conflict between King Peter IV of Aragon and King James II of Majorca. On 2 May, the two arrived in Perpignan, the capital of Majorca, where they convinced James to renew his homage to Peter. He was back in Avignon by 7 August.

In January 1345, fighting broke out in the Republic of Genoa along rural–urban and noble–popular lines. In February, Pope Clement VI sent Conti to Genoa to broker peace. He in turn appealed to the lord of Milan, Luchino Visconti. On 18 June, a truce was agreed through the intervention of the Visconti. Later that year, Clement ordered Conti back to Genoa to prevent the republic from being drawn into an alliance with the Kingdom of Hungary. On 15 June, Conti obtained from Clement a bull confirming the University of Padua as a studium generale. He was still in Genoa in July 1346, when he sent a letter to Clement acknowledging his failure. Clement sent him as nuncio to the Kingdom of Naples, since the legate, Cardinal Bertrand de Déaulx, was delayed. Conti was accompanied by Guillaume de Rosières, bishop of Cassino. This was one of a series of three missions—including the second to Genoa and the subsequent mission to Hungary—dealing with the fallout from the assassination of Andrew, Duke of Calabria. Conti arrived in Naples in August. When the cardinal arrived towards the end of the year, Conti requested to be allowed to return to Padua, which was granted on 21 April 1347.

On his return trip to Padua, Conti stopped in Valmontone and in Rome, where he witnessed the uprising of Cola di Rienzo. From Valmontone he wrote a letter dated 29/30 July to his vicar, Leonardo di San Sepolcro, describing Cola and his government. He refers to Cola as "a man of the people, not wealthy" and "a notary, competently literate in grammar". He travelled from Rome to Avignon, before finally arriving in Padua on 7 October 1347.

=== Return to Padua ===
On 26 November 1347, Conti obtained from the lord of Padua, Jacopo da Carrara, a judgement confirming the law professors' right to vote on candidates for graduation to the exclusion of the rectors of the university. In December, he resumed his reforms at the convent of San Giacomo in Monselice. In the spring of 1348, he began a series of canonical visitations in his diocese, which were cut short in the summer by the arrival of the Black Death. In the fall, he invited the Olivetans to settle in two houses in the diocese.

On 18 April 1349, Conti granted a canonry of his church to Petrarch in a large public ceremony. This grant and Petarch's visit to Padua were orchestrated by Jacopo da Carrara. The Cardinal Guy of Boulogne assisted at the ceremony, since Conti was accompanying him on a legation to Hungary. With the canonry Petararch acquired a house by the cathedral. Conti and Petarch became close friends in subsequent years. Even while Conti was in Hungary, Petrarch sent him a letter, Nuper ab occeano, one of his metrical epistles (Epistolae metricae, III, 25). Referring to his and the bishop's familiarity with all of Europe, the letter extols their homeland, Italy, above all other countries.

=== Hungarian mission ===
Conti may have been selected to accompany Guy on his Hungarian mission because of his prior experience with Neapolitan politics. Guy appointed him nuncio. The main diplomatic goal of the mission was to prevent a new Hungarian intervention in Naples. Guy left Hungary as soon as the diplomatic mission was fulfilled, appointing Conti as his subdelegate to complete the mission. Conti was accompanied by his own chaplain, John. As subdelegate, he issued five acts in September 1349, one in Buda and four in Esztergom, most of them dealing with legation's finances. The mission did not accomplish its main goal and only delayed King Louis I's second Neapolitan expedition.

=== Final years ===
Conti returned to Padua in October 1349. On 15 February 1350, in the presence of Guy of Boulogne and with Petrarch in attendance, the body of Saint Anthony of Padua was reburied in his basilica. Conti accompanied Guy to Rome to celebrate the jubilee and was back in Padua by May. There he resumed his visitations and ordained several priests.

In the fall of 1350, Clement VI dispatched Conti to negotiate an alliance between Padua, Ferrara and the Republic of Venice in order to dislodge Giovanni Visconti as lord of Bologna. He was back in Padua by May 1351, when he attended a synod held by Guy of Boulogne. In the fall of 1351, Petrarch wrote another letter to Conti, criticizing the Avignon Papacy. It is included in the collection Liber sine nomine (no. VIII). In it, he recalls how he had unwisely ignored Conti's advice not to go to Avignon:

Ah, how often have I recalled your fatherly voice and your wise warning when you said to me as I was preparing to depart: "Where are you going? What are you striving for? What ambition drives you on, unmindful of your own good? Don't you know what you're getting into and what you're leaving behind? Will you knowingly go off to a task unworthy of you? Look closely, I beg of you, at what you're doing, where you're rushing. If I know you at all, you'll be sorry for your haste. You know full well the snares of the court; once you get caught, you won't be able to get out when you wish."

Conti died in Padua on 2 November 1352. Before the end of the month, Petrarch wrote a letter of consolation to the Paduan clergy. It is among his Epistolae familiares (XV, 14). His will and testament, drawn up in Padua in 1339, lists his books, mostly theological volumes, including works by Augustine, plus some Roman history, including works by Seneca. He owned a copy of Joachim of Fiore's Concordia and seems to have had Joachimite leanings.

== Bibliography ==
- Billanovich, Maria Chiara (2003). "Il messale del vescovo Ildebrandino Conti" (PDF). In Grado Giovanni Merlo (ed.). Vescovi medievali. Edizioni Biblioteca Francescana. pp. 267–302.
- Epstein, Steven A. (1996). Genoa and the Genoese, 958–1528. University of North Carolina Press.
- Kohl, Benhamin G. (1983). "Conti, Ildebrandino". Dizionario Biografico degli Italiani, Volume 28: Conforto–Cordero (in Italian). Rome: Istituto dell'Enciclopedia Italiana. ISBN 978-8-81200032-6.
- Kohl, Benjamin G. (1998). Padua Under the Carrara, 1318–1405. Johns Hopkins University Press.
- Maléth, Ágnes (2019). "The Legation of Gui de Boulogne in the Hungarian Kingdom". Specimina Nova Pars Prima Sectio Medaevalis. 10: 95–120.
- Musto, Ronald G. (2003). Apocalypse in Rome: Cola Di Rienzo and the Politics of the New Age. University of California Press.
- Sambin, Paolo (1950). "Note sull'attività politico-diplomatica di Ildebrandino Conti, amico del Petrarca". Archivio veneto. Ser. 5. 46: 16–44.
- Wilkins, Ernest Hatch (1956). The "Epistolae Metricae" of Petrarch: A Manual. Edizioni di Storia e Letteratura.
- Wilkins, Ernest Hatch (1961). Life of Petrarch. University of Chicago Press.
- Zacour, Norman P., ed. (1973). Petrarch's Book Without a Name: A Translation of the Liber Sine Nomine. Pontifical Institute of Mediaeval Studies.
