= Rinaldo Orsini =

Rinaldo Orsini may refer to:

- Rinaldo Orsini (cardinal) (died 1374), cardinal from 1350
- Rinaldo Orsini (condottiero) (1402–1450)
- Rinaldo Orsini (archbishop) (died 1509), archbishop of Florence (1474–1508)
