= Raymond de Canillac =

French lawyer, bishop and cardinal

Cardinal Raymond de Canillac
- Cardinal-Priest
- Church: Santa Croce in Gerusalemme (1350-1361)
- Diocese: Bishop of Palestrina (1361-1373)

Orders
- Created cardinal: 17 December 1350 by Pope Clement VI

Personal details
- Born: ca. 1300 Roche de Canilhac FR
- Died: 20 June 1373 Avignon FR
- Buried: Cathedral, Maguelone FR
- Occupation: courtier, lawyer
- Profession: bishop
- Education: Doctor in utroque iure
- Alma mater: University of Montpellier
- Coat of arms

Raymond de Canillac (born ca. 1300, died 1373) was a French lawyer, bishop, and cardinal. He was born at Roche de Canilhac, the family castle, in the diocese of Mende in the Gevaudan in central France, the son of Guillaume de Canillac and a sister of Cardinal Bertrand de Déaulx. Both of his uncles, Pons and Guy, were successively abbots of Aniane (Diocese of Maguelonne, 30 km. from Montpellier), as was a nephew of the Cardinal, also called Pons. In 1345 his niece Garine, the daughter of his brother Marquis and of Alixène de Poitiers-Valentinois, married Guillaume Roger, Vicount of Beaufort, the brother of Cardinal Pierre Roger de Beaufort, who became Pope Clement VI. Raymond became a member of the Canons Regular of Saint Augustine (CRSA). He studied law at the University of Montpellier, and obtained the degree of Doctor in utroque iure (Civil Law and Canon Law).

== Beginning a career ==
He was granted the benefice of Provost of the Chapter of the Cathedral of Maguelone, which he already held in 1333. He presided over the Provincial Chapter of the Canons Regular, held at Narbonne on 25 November 1339, in which the statutes of the Augustinians, which had been approved by Pope Benedict XII, were promulgated. In 1340 he obtained from King Philip VI confirmation of the privileges which were claimed by the Chapter of the Cathedral of Maguelone. In the same year, on 16 August, Raymond de Cahillac was present in Montpellier at the swearing-in of the Locumtenens of the Rector of the Universitatis Studium of Montpellier.

In 1342 he was chosen as Arbitrator, along with Cardinal Guillaume d'Aure and Archbishop Jean de Baussan of Arles, between the Vestiary of the Cathedral of Maguelone and the cloistral Canons in the matter of provision of clothing, which was a duty of the Vestiary.

Raymond was named Abbot of the Abbey of Sainte-Foi de Conques (Diocese de Rodez).

== Episcopacy and Cardinalate ==
Raymond was named Archbishop of Toulouse on 28 March 1345 by Pope Clement VI. He held the See until his promotion to the cardinalate.

In his fourth Consistory for the creation of cardinals, on 17 December 1350, Pope Clement VI named twelve prelates to that high office, among whom was Raymond de Canillac. The new cardinal was appointed Cardinal-Priest of the titulus of Santa Croce in Gerusalemme. He was sometimes called the 'Cardinal of Jerusalem'. In consideration of his new rank he resigned the Chancellorship of the University of Toulouse, at the same time, no doubt, as he resigned the Archbishopric of Toulouse.

In order to maintain his new status as a Prince of the Church, Cardinal de Canillac was granted a number of benefices. These included: the Benedictine priory in the diocese of Gap; a canonry, prebend, and provostship in the Collegiate Church of S. Patroclus in Soest in the diocese of Cologne; a parish church in the diocese of Toulouse; a canonry in Toulouse; a canonry, prebend, and the office of Treasurer in the church of S. Severinus in Cologne; a canonry, prebend, and the provostship in Bremen; a Benedictine priory in the diocese of Lyon; a Benedictine priory in the diocese of Riez; a canonry in the Cathedral of Mende; a canonry, prebend, and the office of Dean in the Cathedral of Uppsala; a canonry and prebend in the Church of Vasteras in Sweden; a canonry and prebend in the Church of Stregnas in Sweden; a canonry in the Cathedral of Carcassonne.

In 1359, Cardinal Raymond was appointed, along with Cardinals Hélie de Talleyrand and Audouin Aubert, to examine the controversy between the Master of the Order of St. John of Jerusalem and the Castellan of Emposta. In 1360 the Pope appointed him the Papal Collector to receive, along with Pierre Scatisse the French Treasurer, the money which was being raised biennially for the ransom of King John II, who was a prisoner in London after the Battle of Poitiers.

On 27 March 1360 there was an exchange of property rights, in which the Baron de Peyre ceded his rights over the castles of Hermaux, Moriès and Muret, to Marquis the Sieur de Canillac, with the consent of the suzerain the Bishop of Mende; present at the transaction was Cardinal Raymond de Canillac.

On 4 November 1361 Cardinal Raymond was promoted to the See of Palestrina, which he held until his death. Ralf Lützelschwab points out that there is no evidence of activity as a Legate or of higher level participation in Curial business as far as Cardinal Raymond is concerned.

== Conclave of 1362 ==
Pope Innocent VI (Pierre Roger) died in Avignon on 12 September 1362. Twenty cardinals, including Raymond de Canillac, entered Conclave on 22 September, the Feast of St. Maurice, to elect his successor. There were a number of viable candidates. The Limousin faction of some six cardinals was prepared to have one of their number elected. Both Cardinals Talleyrand and Guy de Boulogne were ambitious and interested. In his Cronica, Matteo Villani says, however, that the cardinals were in agreement on the aged Benedictine monk, Cardinal Hugues Roger, the brother of Pope Clement VI, and that in the balloting he received fifteen of the twenty votes. Cardinal Hugues was not interested, though, and refused the honor of the papacy. Then the Cardinals turned to the Cardinal of Toulouse, who was able to gather eleven votes, but no more. Another candidate was able to attract ten votes, and yet another nine, but not the required fourteen. Finally, the cardinals looked outside the Sacred College, and chose Guillaume Grimoard, the Abbot of St. Vincent in Marseille, who was Papal Nuncio in Italy. He returned to France, and on 31 October 1362 accepted the election. He was crowned as Urban V.

On 28 November 1362, the new Pope, Urban V, assigned Cardinal Raymond de Canillac the task of reforming the Statutes of the University of Law at Montpellier, where Urban had been a student in Canon Law. Raymond's uncle, Cardinal Bertrand de Déaulx had performed the same function two decades earlier.

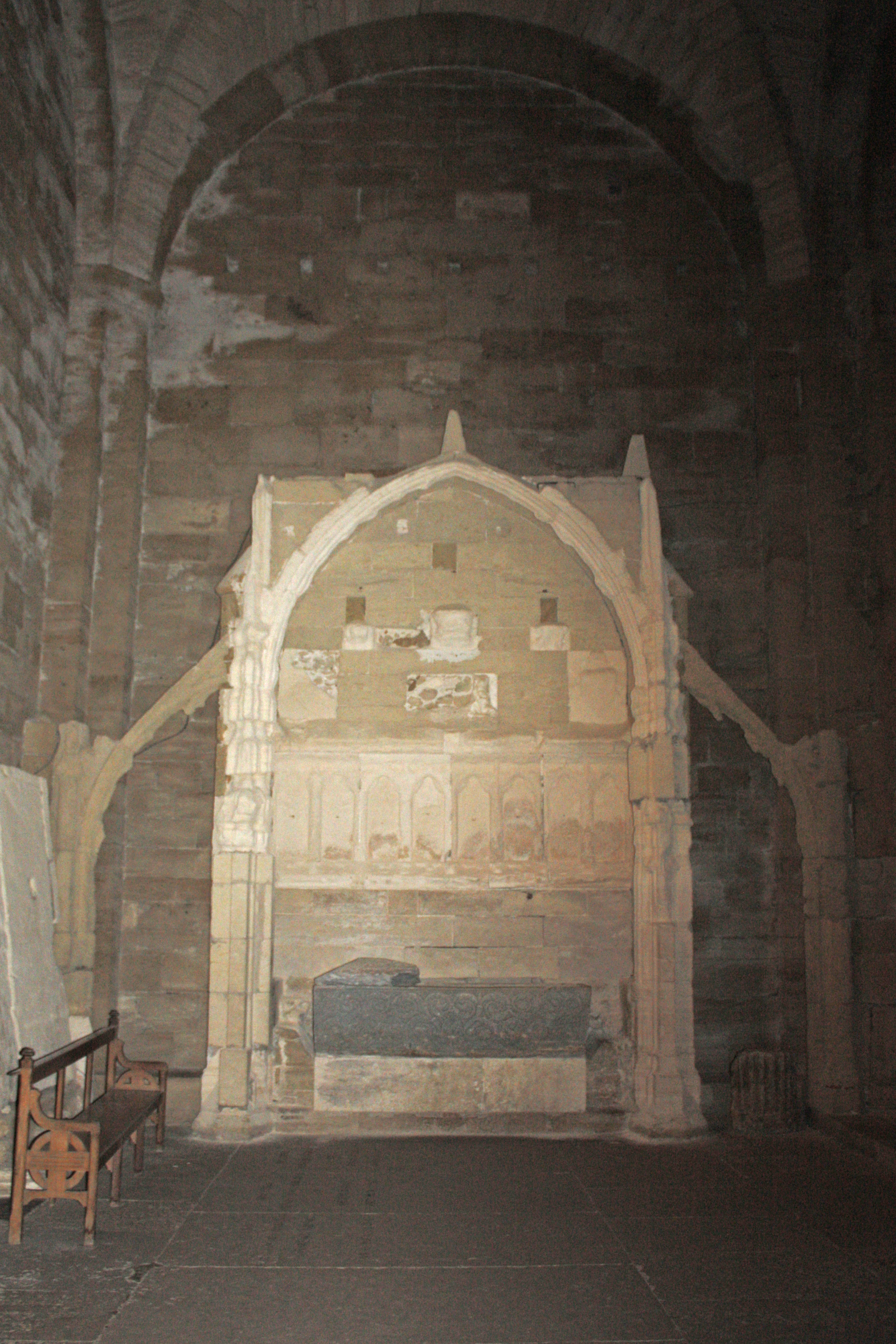
Tomb of Cardinal de Canillac

In 1364 Cardinal de Canillac was judge in a lawsuit between the Archbishop and Canons of Tarragona and the Alanyani family. The procurators of the Archbishop and Canons placed a supplication before Pope Urban V, requesting a determination of nullity against the Cardinal. The Pope's decision was to add Cardinal Pierre Itier to the case as a second judge.

Pope Urban V finally gave way to pressure from every side, and decided to return to Rome. Despite considerable complaining from the cardinals, who were not eager to give up the pleasant life in the Rhone valley for the plague infested city of Rome, Pope Urban departed from Avignon on 30 April 1367. Only four of the cardinals were left behind to keep the business operating, Raymond de Canilhac, Pierre Itier, Jean de Blandiac, and Pierre de Monteruc, the Vice-Chancellor. Monteruc had been expected to follow the Pope to Italy, but he claimed illness and stayed behind. The Italian visit was eventful, but on 26 July 1370 the Pope wrote to the Romans that he had pressing problems north of the Alps that required his presence in Avignon. He sailed for Marseille on 16 September, reaching Avignon on the 24th. He was stricken with a serious illness in November, however, and died on Thursday, 19 December 1370.

The Conclave to elect Pope Urban V's successor began on 29 December 1370, with sixteen of the twenty cardinals in attendance, including Cardinal de Canillac. On the morning of 30 December, without resorting to a scrutiny, the Cardinals elected 'by inspiration' Cardinal Pierre Roger de Beaufort. He was ordained a priest on 4 January 1371 and consecrated a bishop and crowned Pope on 5 January. He took the throne name Gregory XI.

Cardinal Raymond de Canillac had a nephew, Reynald de Themenis, who was a Canon in Lincoln Cathedral, whose canonry and prebend were being usurped under false pretenses in 1371, and for several years previously, with the cooperation of the King. Pope Gregory XI wrote to the King and the Bishop of Lincoln threatening legal proceedings if the situation were not rectified.

== Death and legacy ==
Cardinal Raymond de Canillac died in Avignon on 20 June 1373, and was interred temporarily in the Franciscan Church. His body was subsequently transported to Maguelone, and he was buried in the Cathedral there on 4 July 1373.

== Bibliography ==
- Baluze [Baluzius], Etienne [Stephanus] (1693). Vitae paparum Avenionensium, hoc est, Historia pontificum romanorum qui in Gallia sederunt ab anno Christi MCCCV. usque ad annum MCCCXCIV (in Latin). Vol. Tomus primus. Paris: apud Franciscum Muguet. Nouvelle edition by G. Mollat II (Paris 1927).
- Baluze, Etienne (1693). Vitae Paparum Avenionensium, Hoc est Historia Pontificum Romanorum qui in Gallia sederunt ab anno Christi MCCCV usque ad annum MCCCXCIV (in Latin). Vol. Tomus secundus. Paris: Muguet.
- Baronio, Cesare (1872). Augustin Theiner (ed.). Annales ecclesiastici: A. D. 1-1571 denuo excusi et ad nostra usque tempora perducti ab Augustino Theiner (in Latin). Vol. Tomus vigesimus quartus (24). Paris: Typis et sumptibus Ludovici Guerin. [1313-1333]
- Baronio, Cesare (1872). Augustinus Theiner (ed.). Annales ecclesiastici: A. D. 1-1571 denuo excusi et ad nostra usque tempora perducti ab Augustino Theiner (in Latin). Vol. Tomus vigesimus quintus (25). Barri-Ducis: Typis et sumptibus Ludovici Guerin.[1333-1356]
- Bliss, William H., ed. (1895). Calendar of Entries in the Papal Registers Relating to Great Britain and Ireland: Papal Letters. Vol. II (1305-1342). London: H.M. Stationery Office.
- Bliss, William Henry; Johnson, C. (1897). Calendar of Entries in the Papal Registers Relating to Great Britain and Ireland: Papal Letters. Vol. III (1342-1362). London: H.M. Stationery Office.
- Duchesne, François (1660). Histoire De Tous Les Cardinaux François De Naissance (in French). Vol. Tome I. Paris: Aux despens de l' Autheur. pp. 515–516.
- Duchesne, François (1660). Preuves de l' Histoire de tous les cardinaux François de naissance (in French and Latin). Paris: Aux despens de l'Autheur & se vendent chez luy. pp. 311–322.
- Eubel, Konrad (1898). Hierarchia catholica medii aevi: sive Summorum pontificum, S.R.E. cardinalium, ecclesiarum antistitum series ab anno 1198 usque ad annum [1605] perducta e documentis tabularii praesertim Vaticani collecta, digesta (in Latin). Vol. I. Münster: sumptibus et typis librariae Regensbergianae. (second edition 1913).
- Fournier, Marcel (1891). Les statuts et privilèges des universités françaises depuis leur fondation jusqu'en 1789 (in French and Latin). Vol. Tome II, premiere partie. Paris: L. Larose et Forcel.
- Lützelschwab, Ralf (2007). Flectat cardinales ad velle suum? Clemens VI. und sein Kardinalskolleg: Ein Beitrag zur kurialen Politik in der Mitte des 14. Jahrhunderts (in German). Berlin: De Gruyter. pp. 491–493. ISBN 978-3-486-84130-5.
- Renouard, Yves (1970). The Avignon papacy, 1305-1403. Hamden CT USA: Archon Books. ISBN 978-0-208-01156-5.
- Rollo-Koster, Joëlle (2015). Avignon and Its Papacy, 1309–1417: Popes, Institutions, and Society. New York-London: Rowman & Littlefield Publishers. ISBN 978-1-4422-1534-4.
- Sainte-Marthe, Denis de (OSB) (1725). Gallia Christiana, In Provincias Ecclesiasticas Distributa (in Latin). Vol. Tomus tertius (3). Paris: Ex Typographia Regia.
