= Bernard du Bosquet =

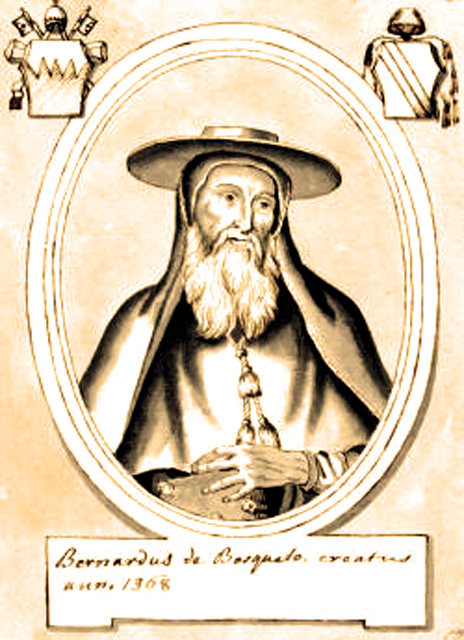
Bernardus de Bosqueto as a cardinal

Bernard du Bosquet (died 19 April 1371), legum doctor, was a professor at the University of Toulouse from 1350, the Archbishop of Naples from 5 September 1365, and a Cardinal of the Roman Catholic Church as priest of Santi Apostoli appointed by Pope Urban V on 22 September 1368 until his death. He participated in the Papal conclave of 1370.

== Works ==
- Decisiones Rotae Romanae (in Latin). Pavia: Gasperino de Fiamberti. 1486.
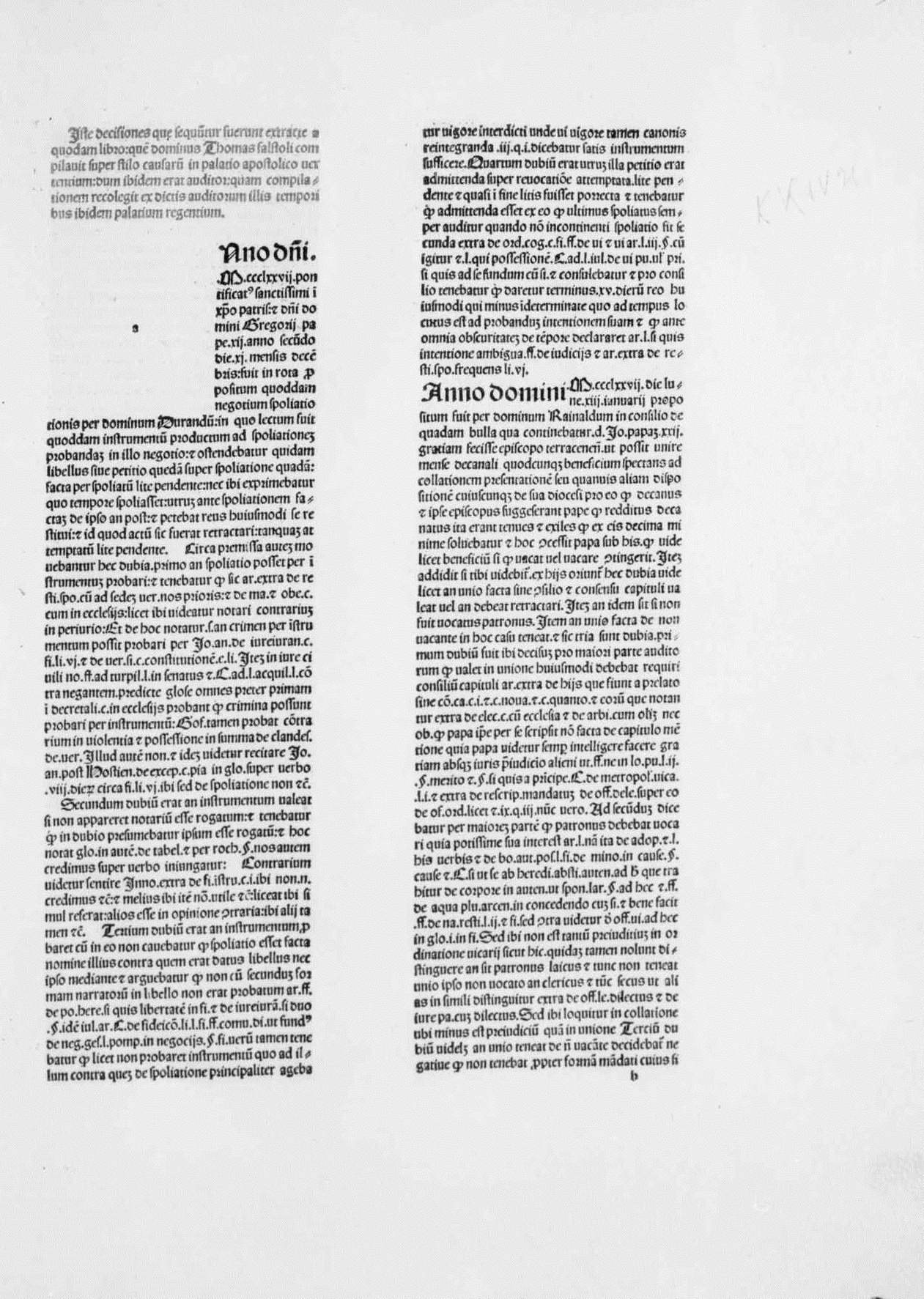
Decisiones Rotae Romanae, 1486
