= Siege of Zadar (1345–1346) =

Successful attempt of the Republic of Venice to capture Zadar

- Part of the Croatian–Venetian wars and Hungarian–Venetian wars
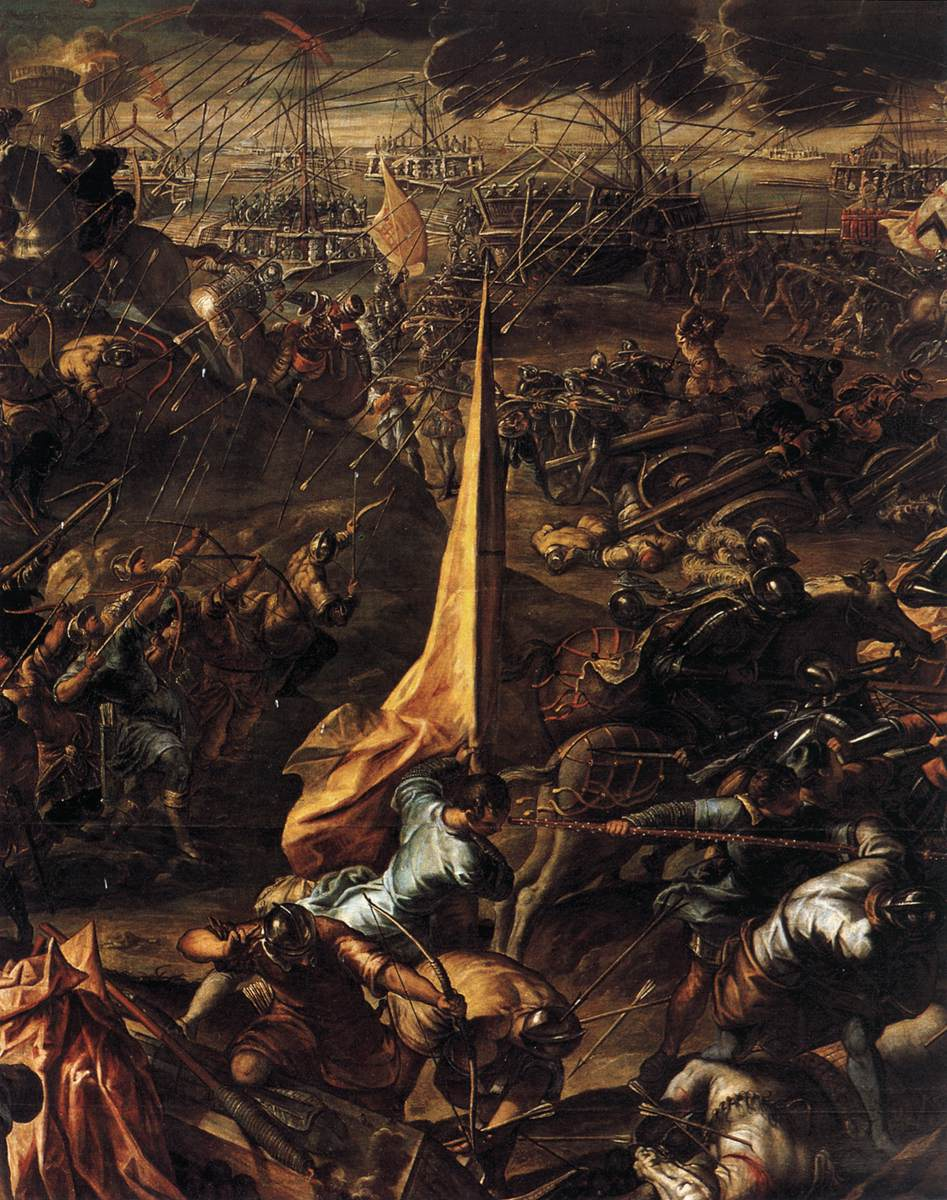
- The Conquest of Zara, painted by Tintoretto in 1584
Date	12 August 1345 – 21 December 1346
Location	City of Zadar, Kingdom of Croatia in personal union with Hungary 44°07′00″N 15°13′00″E
Result	Venetian victory, Zadar became part of the Republic of Venice (until 1357/1358)

Belligerents
Republic of Venice	Kingdom of Croatia; Kingdom of Hungary; City of Zadar

Commanders and leaders
Marco Giustiniani; Pietro de Canale; Pietro Civrano; Marino Faliero; Andrea Mauroceno; Pietro della Franteria	King Louis I Marko Corner, knez (prince) of Zadar; Zoilo Uršulin; Ivan Škrbec

Strength
20,000 – 25,000	4,000 – 6,000 Zadar soldiers 20,000 – 100,000 king's soldiers (?)

Casualties and losses
min. 2,000 – 3,000	min. 500 Zadar soldiers, unknown number of king's soldiers
- Location within Croatia Siege of Zadar (1345–1346) (Mediterranean)

The siege of Zadar (12 August 1345 – 21 December 1346) was a successful attempt of the Republic of Venice to capture Zadar (or Zara), a Croatian coastal city in northern Dalmatia. It was a combined land and sea offensive by the Venetians, consisting of many separate battles and operations against the citizens of Zadar, who refused to accept Venetian suzerainty and demanded autonomy. Despite receiving military aid from Croato-Hungarian king Louis the Angevin, Zadar was unable to resist the siege and was finally defeated.

== Background ==
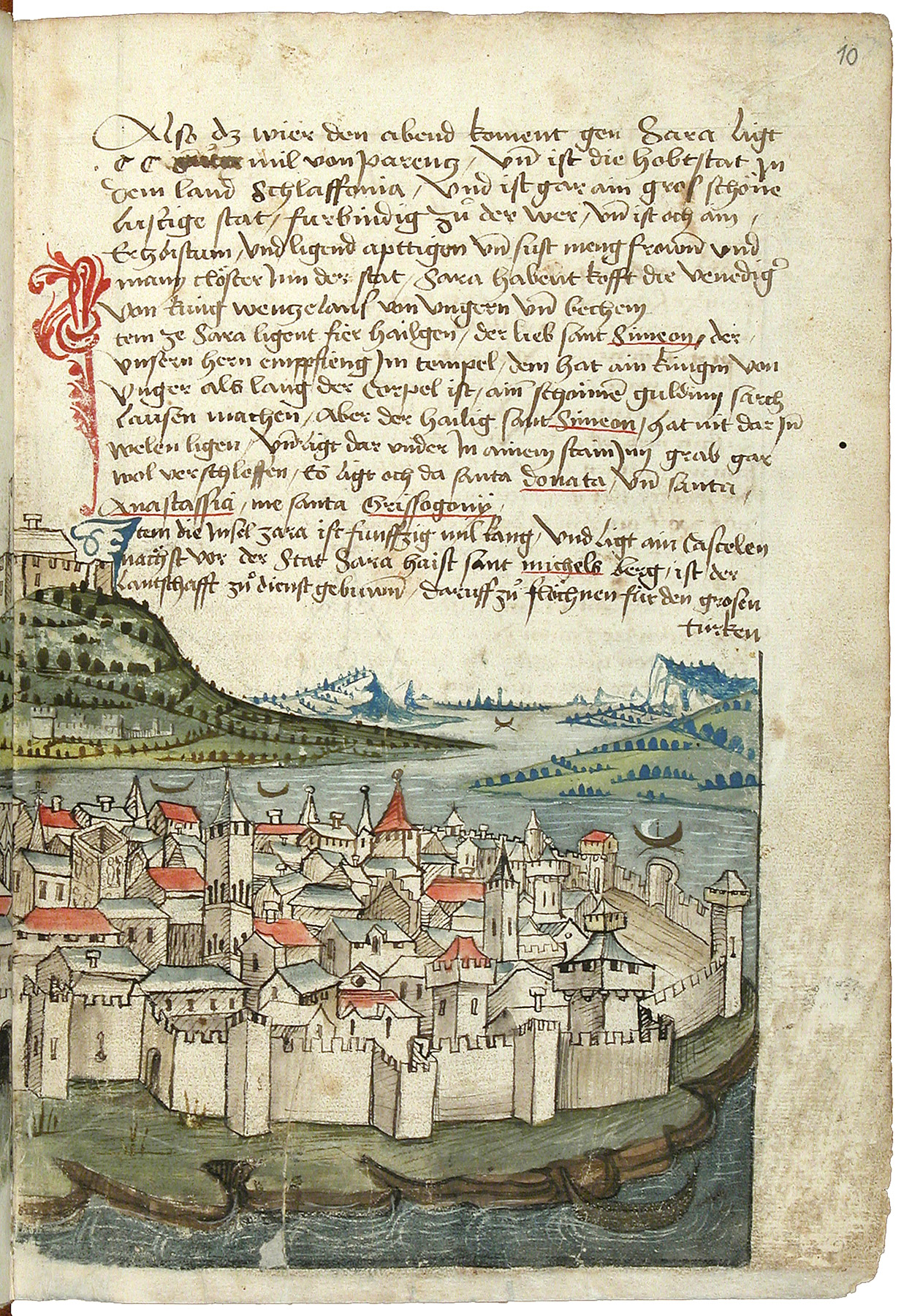
Image of Zadar in the Late Middle Ages

The siege resulted from the long-term complex political relations between the City of Zadar and the Republic of Venice as well as from the change of policy of the Croato-Hungarian ruler after the young Louis of Angevin ascended the throne in 1342. The king wished to maintain full control over the territory of the Kingdom of Croatia, including cities and towns of Dalmatia, most of which were in the hands of the Venetians. The citizens of Zadar rebelled against the rule of the Serenissima Repubblica in 1344, asking king Louis for help. He launched military campaigns to the south of Croatia in September 1344 and in July 1345, but they did not bring the desired breakthrough.

In the meantime the Venetians decided to protect their interests in Dalmatia, gathered troops (some 20,000 – 25,000) and sent them in the summer of 1345 to the area of Zadar. They had both naval and land forces at their disposal, whereas king Louis commanded only land forces.

== Siege ==
On 12 August 1345 Venetians started to besiege the city and the surrounding castles. Their land army was commanded by Marco Giustiniani and their marine forces were under the command of Pietro de Canale.

The siege consisted of many separate operations, movements, battles and other military activities, that can be divided into three phases. The first phase ended at the end of January 1346 with the Venetians' breaking of the harbour chain which from the beginning of siege prevented Venetian galleys from entering the Zadar port. The breaking enabled the besiegers to come closer to the city walls and to control the movements of Zadar ships. In the meantime, Pietro Civrano took over supreme command of the Venetian forces as capitaneus generalis.

The second phase was marked by the king Louis' army entering the conflict. In late springtime the King's forces attacked the Venetian fortress (bastida) built near Zadar at the beginning of the siege, but without success. Although large in number (according some sources up to 100,000 men), they were compressed in the narrow passage between the fortress and the sea, so they could not come closer strong enough to capture the fortress. Besides, they were under heavy fire from two sides – from the Venetian ships and from ballistic devices in the fortress. The major attack of the Croato-Hungarian forces took place on 1 July 1346, but at the end the Venetians carried the day. Louis the Angevin decided to retreat and ordered his troops to move northwards.

In the third phase Zadar's defenders remained alone. They were short of food and water and without new supply lines, but they fought on until December. Finally, on 21 December 1346 the Venetian troops marched into town and took control of it.

== Aftermath ==
The Zaratine bishop, Nicolò Matafari, went into exile after the Venetian conquest, only returning when the city was back in Hungarian hands. The city of Zadar remained under Venetian control until king Louis the Angevin invaded Venetian territories and captured all Dalmatian cities and islands in 1357. On 18 February 1358 the Treaty of Zadar was signed in the city, in which the Republic of Venice renounced the territory between the Gulf of Kvarner and the city of Durrës in favour of Louis.

Zadar remained a self-governing community under Croato-Hungarian kings and queens until 1409, when it was sold, together with all of Dalmatia, to the Republic of Venice by the king Ladislaus of Naples. He was about to be defeated by his opponent for the crown, Sigismund the Luxemburgian, and took the opportunity to sell his "regal rights" over Dalmatia for the sum of 100,000 ducats.

== See also ==
- Timeline of Croatian history
- Timeline of the Republic of Venice
- List of sieges
- Treaty of Zadar
- Siege of Zadar (998)
- Siege of Zadar (1202)
- Siege of Zadar (1813)
- Military history of Croatia
- Military history of the Republic of Venice
- Kingdom of Croatia (1102-1526)

== Sources ==
- Csákó, Judit (2021). "a 1345–1346. évi velencei ostroma a narratív kútfők tükrében [The Siege of Zadar (1345–1346) in light of Narrative Sources]". Századok (in Hungarian). 155 (6). Magyar Történelmi Társulat: 1139–1166. ISSN 0039-8098.
