= Giovanni Orsini (died 1359) =

Roman nobleman and bishop

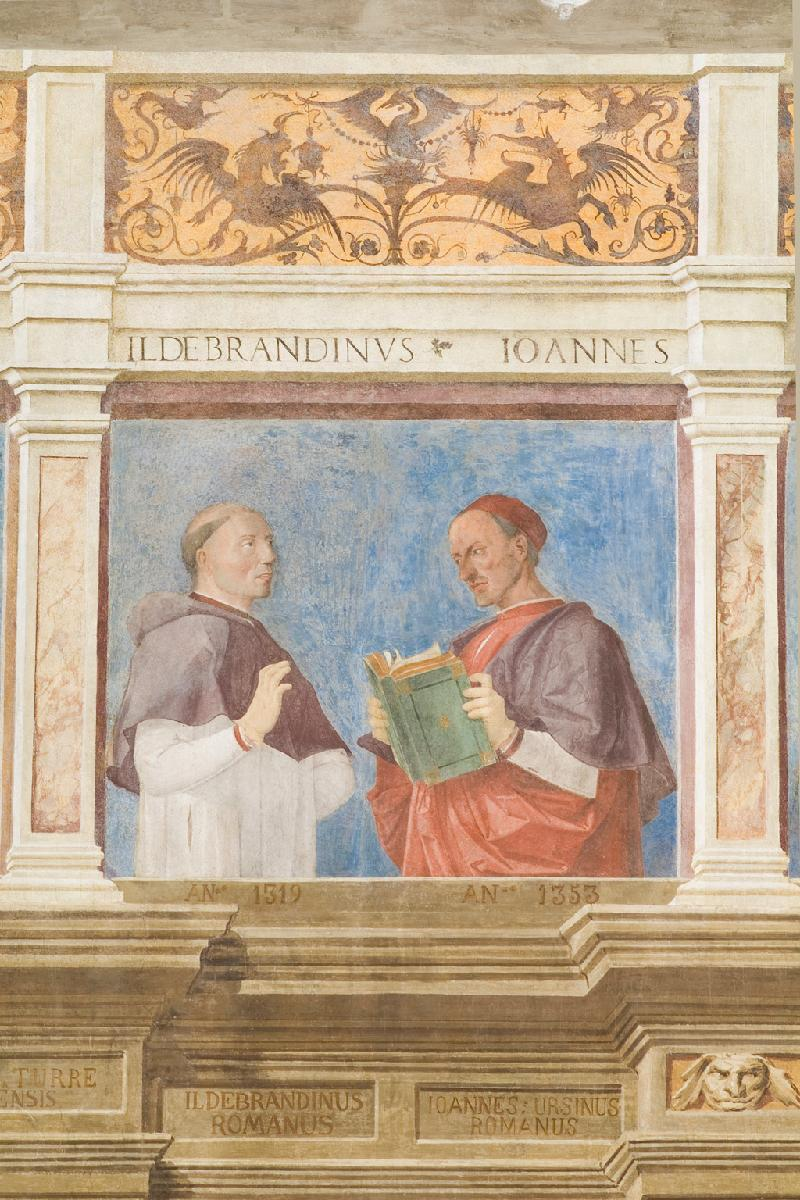
Giovanni Orsini (right) with his predecessor in a painting by Bartolomeo Montagna in the diocesan museum of Padua

Giovanni Orsini (died June 1359) was a Roman nobleman of the Orsini family who served as the bishop of Padua from 1353 until his death.

Orsini was a brother of Cardinal Rinaldo Orsini. He studied at the University of Bologna and the University of Padua, where he earned a doctorate. Prior to his election as bishop, he had been a canon of Reims, archdeacon of Brabant in the diocese of Liège and a canon of Padua Cathedral. He was also the honorary sacristan of Urgell and treasurer of Vercelli.

Orsini was appointed bishop on 14 January 1353 by Pope Innocent VI while only in minor orders. He was the last in a string of largely absentee bishops, succeeding Ildebrandino Conti. He continued to work for the papal court in Avignon throughout his episcopate. He may never have visited Padua after becoming bishop. At Avignon, he was a notary, while also being an archpriest of Saint Peter's Basilica in the Vatican. He appointed vicars general to govern his diocese in his absence, each usually serving for about one year. His first vicar was Nicolò Matafari, his brother's chaplain and the archbishop of Zadar.

Orsini died in Avignon in early June 1359. He was succeeded as bishop by Pileo da Prata.

== Bibliography ==
- Carollo, F. (1970–1971). I vescovi di Padova Giovanni Orsini (1353–59) e Pileo da Prata (1359–70): Nuove ricerche d'archivio (Bachelor's thesis). University of Padua.
- Dondi dall'Orologio, Francesco Scipione [in Italian] (1815). Dissertazioni sopra l'istoria ecclesiastica di Padova. Vol. 8. Tipografia del Seminario di Padova.
- Eubel, Konrad, ed. (1913). Hierarchia catholica. Vol. 1 (2nd ed.). Libreria Regensbergiana.
- Kohl, Benjamin G. (1998). Padua Under the Carrara, 1318–1405. Johns Hopkins University Press.
- Longo, Oddone [in Italian] (2005). Padova carrarese. Il Poligrafo.
