= Androin de la Roche =

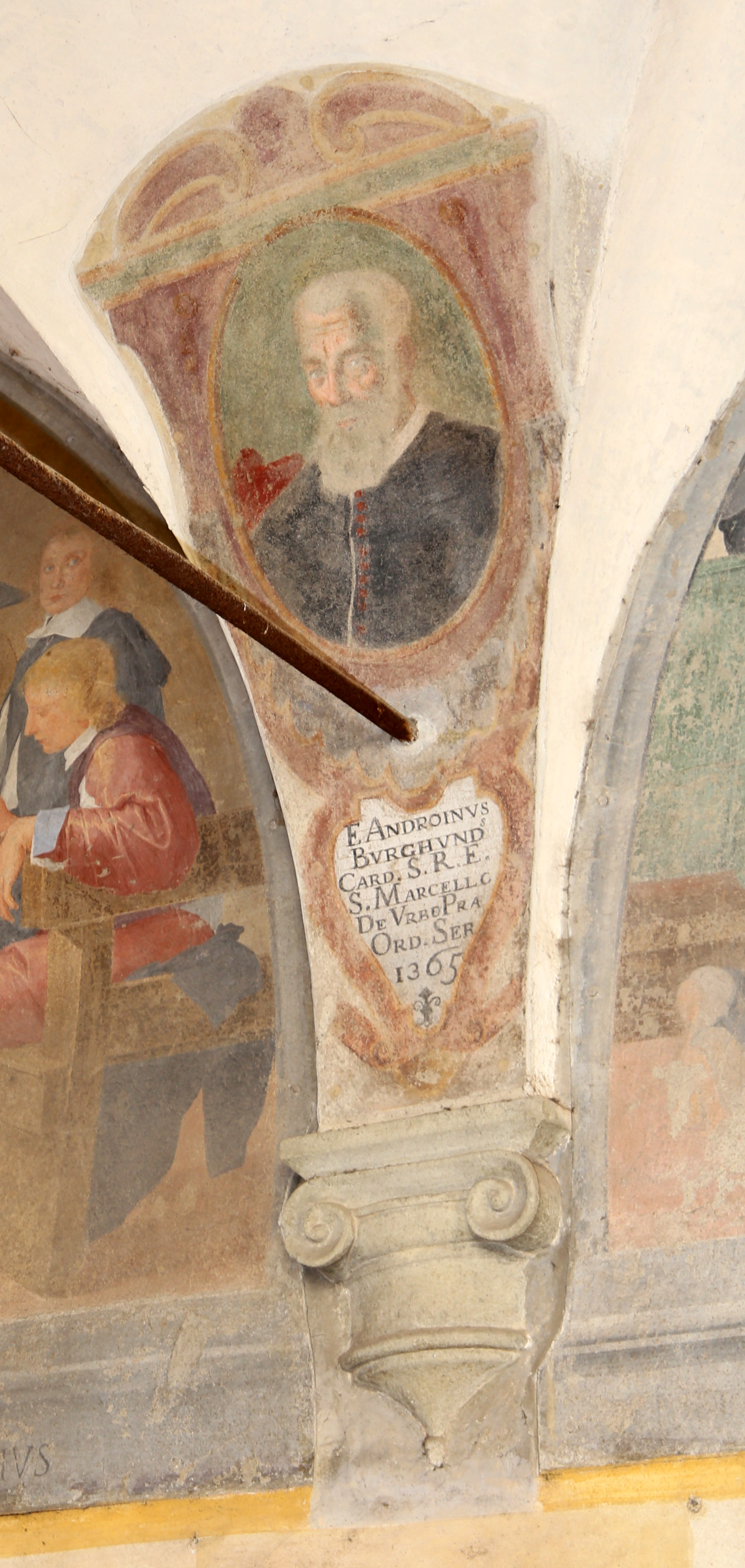
Fresco of Androin in the Santissima Annunziata, Pistoia, by the workshop of Giovanni Martinelli

Androin de la Roche (died 27 October 1369) was a Burgundian monk, papal diplomat and cardinal.

He led a diplomatic mission to the Holy Roman Empire (1356) and two extended legations in Italy (1357–1358, 1364–1368), which are generally regarded as failures. His diplomatic mediation in the Hundred Years' War between 1360 and 1362 had more positive effects, notably the Treaty of Brétigny, for which he was awarded a cardinalate.

== Life ==
=== German mission ===
Androin was a native of Burgundy. He became abbot of Saint-Seine in 1340 and then abbot of Cluny in 1351. On 5 October 1356, Pope Innocent VI charged him with persuading the Emperor Charles IV to intervene diplomatically in the war between France and England. He failed, however, to obtain imperial permission for a papal tax on the German clergy. On 13 February 1357, he returned to the papal court in Avignon.

=== First Italian mission ===
On 28 February 1357, Androin was sent to Italy to reassert Bernabò Visconti's rights as apostolic vicar of Bologna, which had been usurped by Giovanni da Oleggio. He was received with pomp by Visconti in Milan, but he was ignored in Bologna. On 1 April, at Faenza, he met the legate Gil de Albornoz, who opposed the pope's diplomacy with Visconti. On 6 May, Albornoz having requested his recall, the pope appointed Androin to succeed him as legate and continue the crusade against Francesco Ordelaffi. Nevertheless, Albornoz remained behind to finish the siege of Forlì. On 10 August, with Androin's approval, he paid off the mercenaries of Conrad of Landau with 50,000 florins. Albornoz transferred power to Androin on 23 August at Bertinoro.

Androin's tenure as legate in Italy and leader of the crusade was a failure. He lifted the siege of Forlì towards the end of the year, resuming it only in April 1358. On 17 June, his assault on Forlì was beaten back. On 25 July, he captured Meldola after a siege of twenty-four days. That month, however, the mercenaries returned, menacing Tuscany and the March of Ancona. Realizing that Androin was incapable of the task he had been assigned, Innocent VI reappointed Albornoz on 18 September. Androin turned power over to him finally on 23 December.

Attacked in letters addressed to Innocent, he wrote a defensive account his legation. It had its intended effect, since he was entrusted with further missions.

=== Anglo-French mediation ===
On 4 March 1360, Innocent VI charged Androin, Hugh of Geneva and Simon of Langres as nuncios to mediate between England and France in their ongoing war. Androin was at the head of the embassy as it departed Avignon two days later. He successfully mediated the peace of Brétigny, signed on 8 May. After returning to Avignon to report, he was back in Calais to mediate the further negotiations, leading to ratification of the final treaty on 24 October.

In gratitude for his service, Kings Edward III of England and John II of France requested that Androin be made a cardinal. On 17 September 1361, Innocent named him cardinal priest of San Marcello al Corso. With Innocent's permission, he remained in France to participate in the negotiations to end the War of the Breton Succession, albeit without success. A cardinal's hat was sent to him and he did not attend the papal consistory. In April 1362, he visited London to seek better terms for the captive John II and a marriage alliance between the kings. He obtained neither.

Androin returned to Avignon to take part in the papal election of September 1362. There was some dispute about his eligibility on account of his irregular appointment as cardinal, but he was allowed to sit.

=== Second Italian mission ===
On 26 November 1363, Pope Urban V selected Androin to replace Albornoz in Italy for the second time. Androin left Avignon on 15 December with the title of apostolic vicar of Bologna and legate with full authority to make peace with Visconti, with whom relations had deteriorated. Although Albornoz had just defeated Visconti at the battle of Salaruolo, Androin signed a peace treaty with him at Milan in February 1364, the lenient terms of which were regarded by Matteo Villani as an embarrassment to the papacy.

Androin remained as legate in Italy until 1368. Per the terms of the treaty, he paid an indemnity to Visconti in exchange for the return of certain castles. He reconciled the republics of Florence and Pisa in 1364 and maintained the peace between the Visconti and the Kingdom of Naples. In 1366, he organized a league of Italian powers against the marauding companies of mercenaries, including the papacy, Naples, Florence, Pisa, Siena and the cities of Arezzo and Cortona. When Urban V named Androin's successor, Anglic Grimoard, Androin refused to step aside until threatened with excommunication. He returned to Avignon on 13 April 1368.

Androin died at Viterbo on 27 October 1369. He was buried in Cluny. In Avignon, he had established a college of twelve Cluniac monks and twelve students of canon law in the church of Saint-Martial d'Avignon. He owned a copy of John Scotus Eriugena's translation of De Coelesti Hierarchia which found its way into the hands of Adam Easton shortly after his death and is now manuscript Cambridge, University Library, Ii. 3. 32.

== Bibliography ==
- Ferrer i Mallol, Maria Teresa (2002). "Apéndice biográfico de cargos, títulos y dignidades citados en la Historia de los Hechos del cardenal Gil de Albornoz". In Juan Ginés de Sepúlveda (ed.). Obras completas, V: Historia de los Hechos del cardenal Gil de Albornoz, estudio filológico, edición crítica, traducción y notas. Ayuntamiento de Pozoblanco. pp. lix–lxxxii.
- Glénisson, Jean; Mollat, Guillaume (1964). L'administration des états de l'église au XIV^{e} siècle: Correspondance des légats et vicaires-généraux Gil Albornoz et Androin de la Roche (1353–1367). E. de Boccard.
- Harvey, Margaret (1997). "Adam Easton and Pseudo-Dionysius". The Journal of Theological Studies. New. 48 (1): 77–89. JSTOR 23966757.
- Mollat, Guillaume (1911). "La première légation d'Androin de la Roche, abbé de Cluny, en Italie". Revue d'histoire de l'Église de France. 10: 385–403.
- Mollat, Guillaume (1914). "Androin de La Roche". In Alfred Baudrillart; P. Richard; Albert Vogt; Urbain Rouziès (eds.). Dictionnaire d'histoire et de géographie ecclésiastiques. Vol. 2. Paris: Letouzey et Ané. cols. 1770–1773.
