= Guy of Boulogne =

French statesman

His Eminence Guy de Boulogne
- Cardinal-Bishop
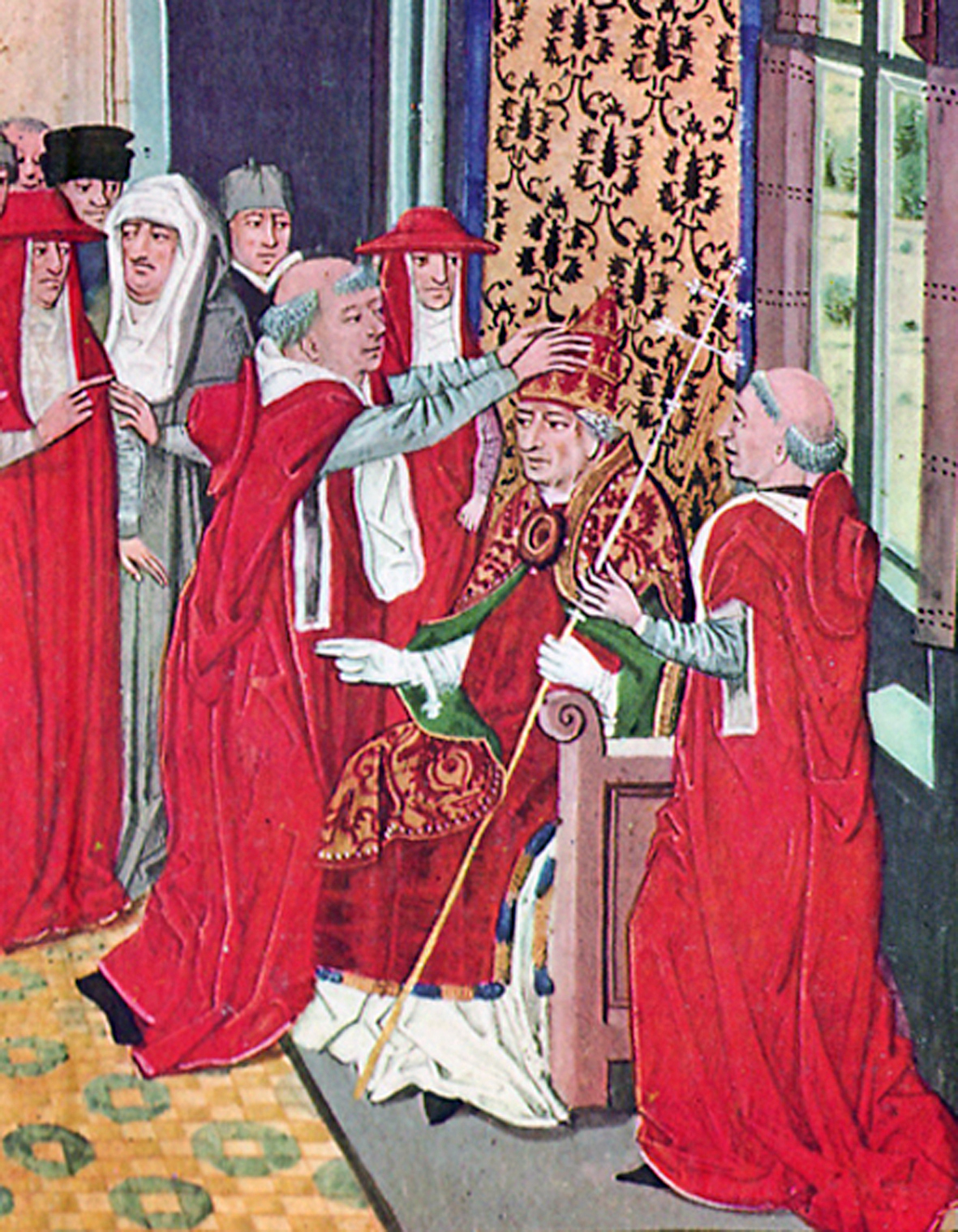
- The crowning of Pope Gregory XI (1371), a miniature from Froissart's Chroniques.
- Church: Santa Cecilia in Trastevere (1342-1350)
- Archdiocese: Lyon (1340-1342)
- Diocese: Porto (1350-1373)

Orders
- Created cardinal: 20 September 1342 by Pope Clement VI

Personal details
- Born: 1313 Boulogne-sur-Mer, France
- Died: 25 November 1373 (aged 59–60) Lleida, Principality of Catalonia
- Buried: Abbaye du Bouschet-Vauluisant; Diocese of Clermont
- Parents: Robert VII of Auvergne and Boulogne; Marie de Flandre
- Occupation: diplomat
- Education: Theology
- Alma mater: University of Paris

Guy of Boulogne, (1313 – 25 November 1373) a statesman and cardinal, served the Avignon Papacy for 33 years. He participated in the papal conclaves of 1352, 1362 also in 1370 while being the Subdean of the Sacred College of Cardinals. His diplomatic postings were extensive, including Hungary, Italy, and Spain. He headed an effort to end the Hundred Years' War. The historian Kenneth Setton called him, "one of the commanding figures of his day, and the letters of Petrarch abound with references to him".

== Family ==
Guy was the third son of Count Robert VII of Auvergne and Boulogne (1317–1325), and Marie, niece of Robert III, Count of Flanders. Guy's family was well-connected to the greatest houses in France and the Empire. His sister Matilda married Count Amadeus III of Geneva, making Guy uncle of four successive counts of Geneva and of antipope Clement VII. The daughter of Guy's eldest brother, Count William XII of Auvergne, Joan Countess of Auvergne, married John Duke of Normandy, later King of France, who thus called Guy by the courtesy title "uncle".

Being a younger son, he was destined for the Church, and therefore Guy was sent to Paris, where he devoted himself to theology. He was especially close to the Dominicans of Paris. In his youth he was made Canon of Amiens. Guy held the post of Archdeacon of Flanders in the Church of Therouanne. He was also, at some point made Canon and Prebend of Liège, which he resigned by 27 January 1344. On 11 October 1340, Pope Benedict XII approved Guy's election as Archbishop of Lyon, and he was duly consecrated, but he held the Archbishopric for less than two years, surrendering it when he became a cardinal and moved to Avignon.

== Cardinal ==
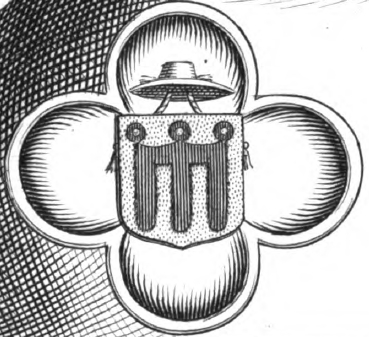
Stemma of Cardinal Guy, from a reliquary

In the Consistory of 20 September 1342, Pope Clement VI (Pierre Roger) named ten new cardinals, among them Archbishop Guy de Boulogne. He was appointed Cardinal Priest tituli S. Caeciliae, of Santa Cecilia in Trastevere. On 6 and 7 November, he was present in Consistory when the financial obligations of the newly appointed Archbishop of Narbonne, the Papal Chamberlain Gasperto du Val, were settled by the Pope. In 1342 he was also provided benefices in the Dioceses of Cologne, Trier, and Mainz by Clement VI. On 20 August 1343, Pope Clement provided Cardinal Guy to the Priory of Duyssell in the diocese of Soissons and the Priory of Calidomonte in the diocese of Terouanne. On 23 October 1343 he was granted the office of Prévôt of Bruges in the diocese of Tournay, and next day the Priory of Fieves in Tournay. On 17 November the Pope gave him a canonry and prebend in the Cathedral of Terouanne. On 19 December the Pope granted Guy the right to grant the benefices once belonging to the late Bernard de Bensewilre to whomever he wished. On 18 March 1344, Cardinal Guy was granted the Priory of Papineloe in the diocese of Terouanne. All of these grants were for the sake of income; the spiritual care of those involved was left to subordinates. They also extended the influence of Guy's family in the territories over which they were secular rulers.

On 22 April 1346, Cardinal Guy was present in Avignon, along with Cardinal Élie de Talleyrand and ten other cardinals, to witness the pact between King John of Bohemia, his son, the future Emperor Charles IV, and Pope Clement VI.

=== Legate in Hungary and Lombardy ===
On 30 November 1348 Pope Clement appointed Cardinal Guy de Boulogne his Apostolicae Sedis Legatus (ambassador) to the King of Hungary (whose wife was a relative of Cardinal Guy) and in other territories under the control of the King of Hungary, in particular the province of Salzburg. Guy departed from Avignon on 15 January 1349. On March 9, 1349, Cardinal Guy took up residence in Padua. The bishop of Padua, Ildebrandino Conti, was to accompany him to Hungary. On 26 April, Pope Clement wrote to the Cardinal, acknowledging a letter from him with enclosures of a letter of Cardinal Guy to King Louis and a letter from King Louis to the Cardinal. In 1349 Cardinal Guy travelled extensively in Hungary, his job being to negotiate peace between the former kingdom and the Kingdom of Naples. The two kingdoms had been at war since the murder of the Hungarian prince Andrea, Duke of Calabria, husband of the Angevin Queen of Naples, Joanna I, in 1345. Naples had been conquered by Andrew's elder brother Louis I of Hungary, and Joanna was forced to flee to Provence, her ancestral home. But when the Black Death drove Louis out of Naples, Joanna was able to return home. The overlord of Naples and Sicily, Pope Innocent VI, was eager to find a solution to the succession crisis, which was made worse by a Hungarian invasion of Naples in late 1349 and again in April 1350.

On 25 January 1350 the Pope again acknowledged receipt of a letter from the Cardinal, as well as a packet containing exchanges between the Cardinal and King Louis. The Pope was doubtful that either King Louis or Queen Joanna would carry out their promises and commitments, though they both said that they were willing to turn over captured towns to the Cardinal on behalf of the Pope. The Pope advised the Cardinal not to go south just yet to receive the territories; he also expressed his longing to see the Cardinal again to enjoy his company. Cardinal Guy was back in Padua on 14 February 1350, when he participated in the translation of the relics of Saint Anthony of Padua to their current resting place in the Basilica of Saint Anthony of Padua. The reliquary containing the jawbone of St. Anthony bears the arms of Cardinal Guy de Boulogne. He also met and had conversations with Petrarch, whom he had known well in Avignon. He was given a mandate by the Pope to visit Rome and participate in the Great Jubilee of 1350. He was instructed, along with Cardinal Bertrand de Déaulx (who had been Legate in Sicily for several years and who had investigated Cola di Rienzi), to investigate the attempted assassination of Cardinal Annibaldo di Ceccano, the Pope's special Legate for the Jubilee. There in Rome he met his mother, who was making the jubilee pilgrimage. He returned to Padua in May, where he conducted a synod, which opened on 8 May 1350; his decree promulgating the decisions of the Synod was signed on 20 May. On 25 May, Pope Clement wrote a letter to King Louis of Hungary, in the belief that Cardinal Guy was still in Italy; he had not yet returned to Avignon. He had returned to Avignon by 7 June 1350. King Louis of Hungary, on his way home from his failed Neapolitan campaign, visited Rome for the Jubilee, and was back in Buda on 25 October 1350.

=== Avignon ===
Later that year, following the death of Cardinal Bernard d'Albi of Pamiers on 13 (or 23) November 1350, Cardinal Guy was translated to the suburbicarian diocese of Porto and Santa Rufina. Baluze remarks that Cardinal Guy was only the second senior Cardinal-priest, but that his senior, Cardinal Guillaume d'Aure, had never been a bishop, whereas Cardinal Guy had been consecrated ten years earlier. Preference at that time was given to cardinals who had been bishops, and therefore Cardinal Guy was promoted.

In 1351, from his prison in Prague, where he had gone to seek support from the Emperor Charles IV, Cola di Rienzi wrote a letter to Guy requesting his assistance in obtaining his freedom and leading a crusade. He was instead brought as a prisoner to Avignon, where he was put on trial for heresy. Somewhat surprisingly he was acquitted.

On 15 May 1352, Cardinal Guy was present at the Curia in Avignon, where he presided over the blessing of the new Abbot of l'Isle-Barbe near Lyon, Jean Pilfort de Rabastencs. On 12 November 1352, he was appointed Dean of S. Martin in Tours, which he held for life.

Pope Clement died in Avignon on 6 December 1352. The Conclave to elect his successor opened on Sunday, 16 December 1352 in the Apostolic Palace in Avignon, with twenty-six cardinals in attendance, including Guy de Boulogne. At mid-morning on 18 December they elected Cardinal Étienne Aubert, who took the name Innocent VI. He was crowned on 30 December 1352.

Immediately after his coronation on 30 December 1352, the new Pope, Innocent VI, appointed Cardinal Guy as the principal facilitator in negotiations between the English and the French for an end to the war. Frequent meetings took place at Calais and Boulogne. Cardinal Guy was attempting to use all of his credit with the French monarchy to bring about a peace with England, which would greatly enhance his prestige. He seems to have gone somewhat too far and he nearly succeeded in alienating the French King, who was disappointed at the proposed concessions. At the same time Cardinal Guy did succeed in arranging a peace between the French King and Navarre. But then King Edward III of England also made a treaty with the French claimant to the Duchy of Brittany, to the great discomfort of King John. During the negotiations, when he was in Paris, on 16 September 1353, the Cardinal dedicated the Carmelite Church in Paris, with the King, John II, and Queen Jeanne attending. On 6 April 1354 at Guînes, Cardinal Guy de Boulogne witnessed the signing by representatives of France and England of a preliminary accord for ending the Hundred Years' War. The preliminary accord had no lasting effect. The Battle of Poitiers took place on 19 September 1356, and King John II was captured by the Black Prince. The government of France collapsed.

=== Legate in Spain ===
Between 1359 and 1361 Cardinal Guy was in Spain on another lengthy legation. The son of King Jayme II of the Kingdom of Majorca, Jayme III, had been captured in battle on 25 Ootober 1349, and spent the next thirteen years as "The Man in the Iron Cage". Pope Innocent VI had made numerous demands for his release, and this was one of the purposes of Cardinal Guy's legation. The status of the Kingdom itself was a matter of contention. And there were the disputes with King Pedro of Castile and Pedro IV of Aragon, in what came to be called the War of the Two Peters. In May 1361 Cardinal Guy de Boulogne was able to get the two monarchs to sign a peace treaty. He returned to Avignon on 8 November 1361. The treaty had no effect.

=== Conclave of 1362 ===
In 1362, Cardinal Cardinals Guy of Boulogne, Nicolas de Besse, and Pierre de Beaufort joined in an effort to arrange a settlement in a dispute between John I, Count of Armagnac, and fr:Raimond de Turenne Raimond de Turenne (Raymond VIII Vicomte of Turenne; grand nephew of Pope Clement and nephew of Cardinal Pierre de Beaufort) concerning the Baronies of Pertuis, Meyrargues, Sederon, and Les Pennes. It was claimed that they were illegally occupied by the Vicomte, who claimed that he had been given them by King Louis and Queen Jeanne of Naples, the Count and Countess of Provence. The three cardinals were chosen because they were "parents et amis des deux parties." A financial settlement was arranged, but it did nothing to stop the violence and acquisitive spirit of the Vicomte.

In September 1362, after the death of Pope Innocent VI, the College of Cardinals was divided (according to Jean Froissart) into two factions, one supporting Guy of Boulogne and the other Élie de Talleyrand for pope. In the end a compromise candidate was elected, Abbot Guillaume Grimoald of S. Vincent in Marseille, who was Legate of the Apostolic See in the Kingdom of Sicily, and was not present at the Conclave. He was not even a cardinal. The decision was taken perhaps on September 28, but it was not made public until the day after the arrival of Abbot Grimoald in Avignon, 31 October. Grimoald was proclaimed Pope Urban V.

He took a leading role in negotiating peace between Charles V of France and Charles II of Navarre in 1366.

=== Legate in Italy ===
Pope Urban V had finally agreed to demands from every direction that he should return to Rome. On 20 May 1367, he and the Papal Court set sail from Marseille for Italy. Only five cardinals did not accompany the Pope on his journey. One who did was Guy de Boulogne. On 23 May the party was at Genoa, and on 1 June they were at Pisa. The party stopped in Viterbo while Pope Urban took the body of his late friend Cardinal Egidio Albornoz, who had died on 24 August, to Assisi, where he had wished to be buried in the Basilica of S. Francesco. In the meantime, there were tensions in Viterbo between the retinues of several cardinals and the townsfolk. Rioting broke out on 6 September and lasted three days; ten people were killed. Urban decided it was time to press on for Rome, but with an escort; he prevailed on the Marquis of Ferrara to accompany him, and with 2000 soldiers, the Papal Curia departed for Rome. On Saturday, October 16, 1367 there was again a Pope in Rome, and Urban remained there until 11 May 1368. On 31 October 1367 the Pope consecrated Cardinal Guillaume de Agrifolio Bishop of Sabina, and it was remarked that that was the first time since the reign of Boniface VIII (1295-1303) that a Pope had celebrated Mass at the high altar of St. Peter's. He spent the summer of 1368 in Tuscany at Montefiascone, where he held a Consistory for the creation of Cardinals on 22 September, where eight new cardinals were named, a Roman, an Englishman (Simon Langham) and six Frenchmen. The Emperor Charles IV paid a visit during this time, and, on All Saints Day, 1 November 1368, the Pope crowned the Empress Elizabeth in the Vatican Basilica. Urban was still at Montefiascone on 7 June 1370 when he created two more cardinals, Pierre d'Estaing and Francesco Corsini of Florence. He departed Montefiascone on 26 August 1370 and reached Avignon on September 24. On Thursday, 19 December 1370 Urban V died in Avignon.

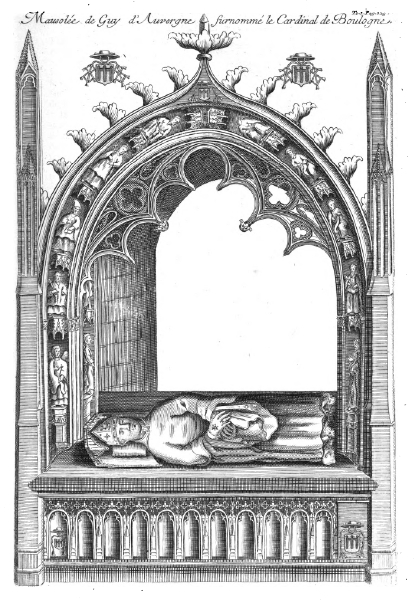
Tomb of Guy de Boulogne

Guy was papal legate in Italy during 1368–1369, while the Pope and the Roman Curia were visiting Rome, and was briefly joined by his nephew, Robert of Geneva, Archbishop of Cambrai, the future Pope Clement VII. The two witnessed an imperial diploma of Charles IV at Lucca on 28 February 1369. On 13 March 1369 Emperor Charles authorized the payment of 5000 gold gulden to Cardinal Guy, his Statthalter in Italy; he received another 3000 gulden on 5 May. On 13 June 1369, Cardinal Guy was named Emperor Charles' Vicar General of Lucca and its territory for a period of three years. In Lucca Guy established his headquarters while he served as "Lieutenant and General Vicar" for the Empire "in the regions [lit. parts] of Italy", having been appointed "by our Caesarean [i.e., imperial] majesty" Charles IV.

=== Conclave of 1370 ===
On 21 December 1370, Guy gave a eulogy, prepared in a single day, at the funeral of Urban V in the church of Notre-Dame-des-Doms in Avignon. On 30 December, Cardinal Pierre Roger de Beaufort, a nephew of Clement VI, was elected to succeed Urban. The election took place on the morning of 30 December 1370, without a scrutiny, by "inspiration". On the same day the new Pope wrote to the King of France, "hodie per viam Sancti Spiritus evocarunt." ('Today they named me by the method of the Holy Spirit') On 4 January 1371, Cardinal Guy de Boulogne, Bishop of Porto and Santa Rufina, ordained him a priest. On the next day, the Vigil of the Epiphany, 5 January 1371 Pierre Roger de Beaufort was consecrated a bishop, presumably by the cardinal who had the centuries-old right, the Bishop of Ostia, Guillaume de la Sudré. He was crowned under the name Pope Gregory XI.

=== Legation to Spain ===
In 1372–73 Guy undertook his final legation, his second to Spain, to try to make peace between Charles II of Navarre and Henry II of Castile. He died in Spain, at Lérida (Lleida) on 25 November 1373. "There were those who said that he died of poison which was administered to him by the treachery [arte] of Charles [II], King of Navarre". His body was returned to France by his brother, Jean Comte d'Auvergne et du Boulogne, and he was buried at the Abbey of Notre-Dame de Bouchet in the diocese of Clermont. The abbey had been founded by Robert Comte d'Auvergne in 1197 or 1198. Cardinal Guy de Boulogne had left the abbey sufficient money to finish his tomb, as well as a legacy to purchase enough property to support twelve monks.
