= Giovanni Gaetano Orsini =

Giovanni Gaetano Orsini may refer to:

- Pope Nicholas III (died 1280), born Giovanni Gaetano Orsini
- Giovanni Gaetano Orsini (died 1335), cardinal-nephew of Pope Nicholas III
