= Pope Gregory XI =

Head of the Catholic Church from 1370 to 1378

- Bishop of Rome
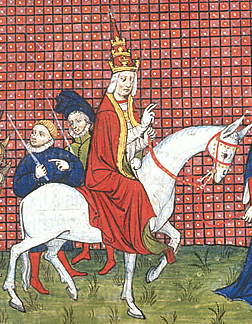
- Gregory XI entering the Palace of the Popes, Avignon
- Church: Catholic Church
- Papacy began: 30 December 1370
- Papacy ended: 27 March 1378
- Predecessor: Urban V
- Successor: Urban VI

Orders
- Ordination: 2 January 1371
- Consecration: 3 January 1371 by Guy of Boulogne
- Created cardinal: 29 May 1348 by Clement VI

Personal details
- Born: Pierre Roger de Beaufort c. 1329 Maumont, Limousin, Kingdom of France
- Died: 27 March 1378 (aged 48–49) Rome, Papal States
- Coat of arms

Papal styles of Pope Gregory XI
- Reference style: His Holiness
- Spoken style: Your Holiness
- Religious style: Holy Father
- Posthumous style: None

Pope Gregory XI (Latin: Gregorius XI; born Pierre Roger de Beaufort; c. 1329 – 27 March 1378) was head of the Catholic Church from 30 December 1370 to his death, in March 1378. He was the seventh and last Avignon pope and the most recent French pope. In 1377, Gregory XI returned the papal court to Rome, ending nearly 70 years of papal residency in Avignon, in modern-day France. His death was swiftly followed by the Western Schism involving two Avignon-based antipopes.

== Early life ==
Pierre Roger de Beaufort was born at Maumont, France, around 1330. His uncle, Pierre Cardinal Roger, Archbishop of Rouen, was elected pope in 1342 and took the name Clement VI. Clement VI bestowed a number of benefices upon his nephew and in 1348, created the eighteen-year-old a cardinal deacon. The young cardinal attended the University of Perugia, where he became a skilled canonist and theologian.

== Conclave 1370 ==
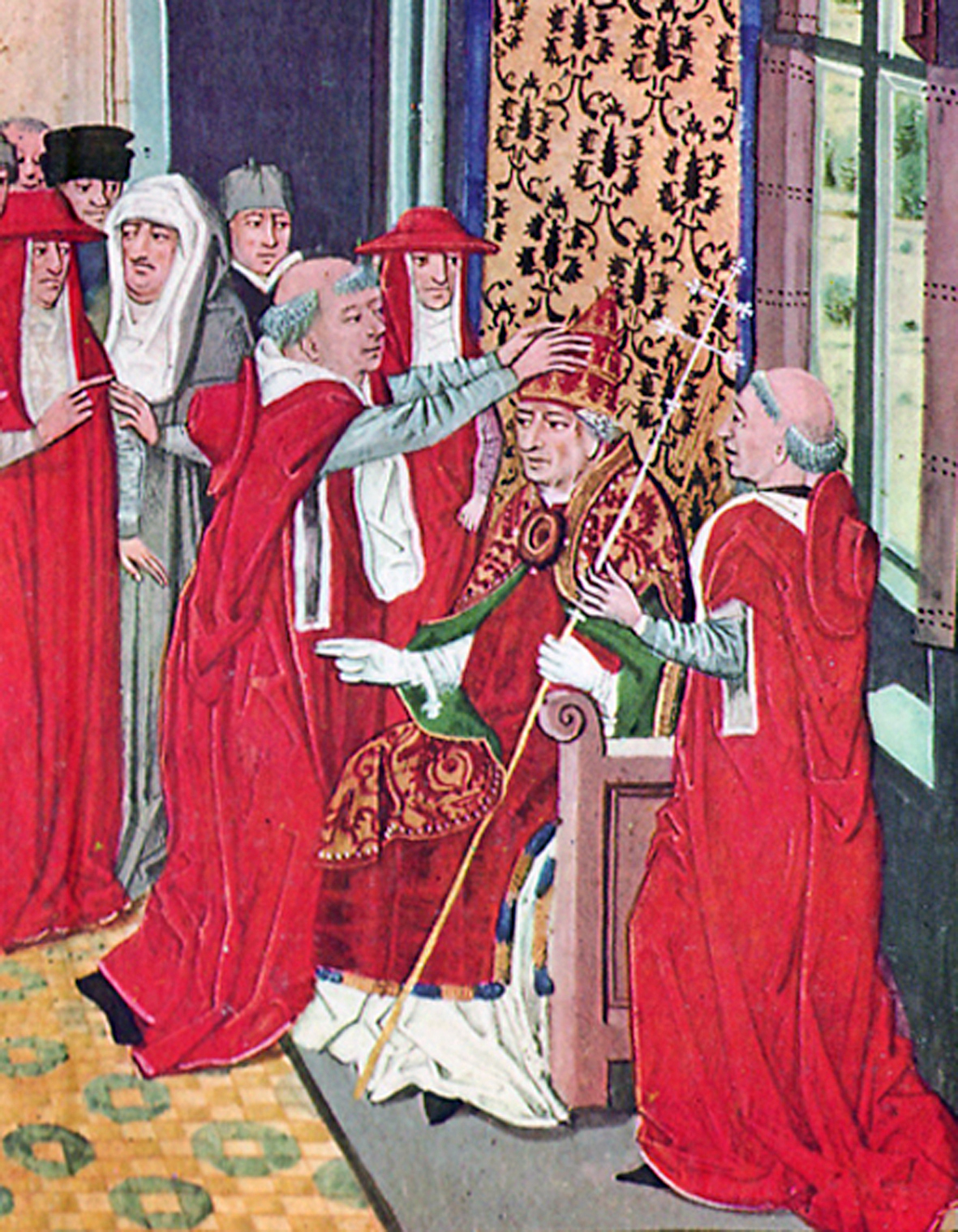
Coronation of Gregory XI

After the death of Pope Urban V (December 1370), eighteen cardinals assembled at Avignon entered the conclave on 29 December. Cardinal Roger was unanimously elected on 30 December. Though initially opposing his own election, Roger eventually accepted and took the name of Gregory XI. On 4 January 1371 he was ordained to the priesthood by the Dean of the College of Cardinals, Guy de Boulogne, and on 5 January was consecrated Bishop of Rome and crowned by the new protodeacon Rinaldo Orsini in the cathedral Notre Dame des Doms in Avignon.

== Papacy (1370 – 1378) ==
Immediately on his accession he attempted to reconcile the Kings of France and England, but failed. Gregory confirmed a treaty between Sicily and Naples at Villeneuve-lès-Avignon on 20 August 1372, which brought about a permanent settlement between the rival kingdoms, which were both papal fiefs.

Gregory also tried to undertake a crusade due to pleas from Catherine of Siena in 1376 by continuing Pope Urban V's call for Christians to stop fighting other Christians, which Urban called for in November 1366. Efforts were also made to reform corrupt practices in the various monastic orders, such as collecting fees from persons visiting holy sites and the exhibiting of faux relics of saints.

Like the preceding popes of Avignon, Gregory XI made the mistake of appointing Frenchmen, who did not understand the Italians and whom the Italians hated, as legates and governors of the ecclesiastical provinces in Italy. Italian city states opposed the move of the papacy back to Rome and specifically Florence opposed to the move due to Gregory wanting to expand the Papal states upon the papal return to Rome. Before moving to Rome, however, he had to give his entire attention to the turbulent affairs of Italy. Lord Bernabo Visconti of Milan, had, in 1371, made himself master of Reggio and other places that were feudatory to the Holy See. Gregory XI excommunicated him and later declared war on him in 1372 against a Florentine-led coalition of Italian city states, which later became known as the War of the Eight Saints (1375–1378). After war broke out, Gregory excommunicated the city and placed the city under interdict on 31 March 1376 in an attempt to quell the rebellion. Catherine of Siena tried to convince Gregory to stop the war on behalf of the Florentine state. This proved to be futile as the war did not end until after Gregory's death. The war ended with a peace treaty concluded at Tivoli in July 1378, negotiated with Pope Urban VI following the death of Gregory XI.

=== Return to Rome ===
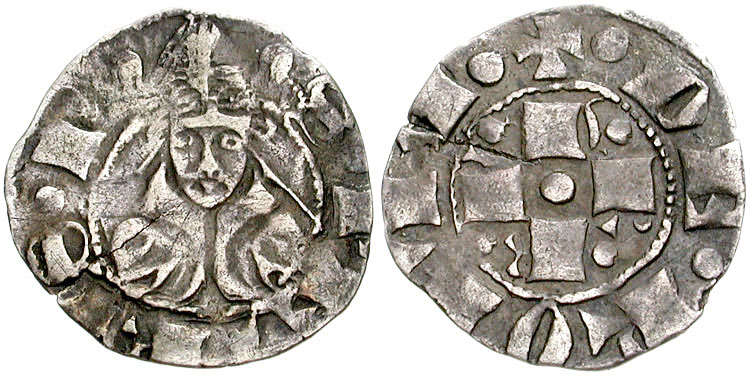
A bolognino of Gregory XI

The return to Rome from Avignon had been an issue since Pope Clement V moved the papacy to Avignon in 1309. From Popes Clement V to Urban V, the popes of the Avignon Papacy had their reasons to stay in France and not return to Rome. After 68 years of papal rule from France, Gregory XI moved the papacy back to its former seat of power of Rome in 1377.

Gregory was constantly receiving pleas from Catherine of Siena through letters. In total, she wrote 14 letters between 1375 and 1378 until Gregory died. These letters dealt with different matters such as peace, church reform, and moving the papacy back to Rome. Catherine persuaded him by saying that it was easier to achieve Gregory's goal of peace among the city states in Italy by expanding the influence of the Papal states if the papacy were back in Rome.

The return of the Curia to Rome began on 13 September 1376. Despite the protests of the French king and the majority of the cardinals, Gregory left Avignon on that day and made his way to Marseille, where he boarded a ship on 2 October. Arriving at Corneto on 6 December, he decided to remain there until arrangements were made in Rome concerning its future government. On 13 January 1377, he left Corneto, landed at Ostia the next day, and from there sailed up the Tiber to the monastery of San Paolo. On 17 January he left the monastery to make a solemn entrance into Rome that same day.

== Death ==
Gregory XI did not survive much longer after his move to Rome. He died on 27 March 1378 aged 48–49. Pope Urban VI, an Italian, was elected to the papacy after his death. However, his decision to move the papacy back to Rome led to the Western Schism and the rise of the Antipopes. Most of Europe supported the Avignonian Clement VII (now considered an antipope) as the true pope.

Subsequently, the Western Schism created by the selection of rival popes forced Europe into a dilemma of papal allegiance. This schism was not resolved fully until the Council of Constance (1414–1418), with the election of Pope Martin V.

== See also ==
- Cardinals created by Gregory XI
- List of popes
- Vicedomino de Vicedominis, in legend elected Pope as Gregory XI

== Footnotes ==
Catholic Church titles
Preceded by Urban V	Pope; 1370–1378	Succeeded by Urban VI
Preceded by Urban V	Pope; 1370–1378	Succeeded by Clement VII as Avignon claiment
