= Bertrand de Déaulx =

French bishop, diplomat and Cardinal

His Eminence Bertrand de Déaulx
- Cardinal-Bishop
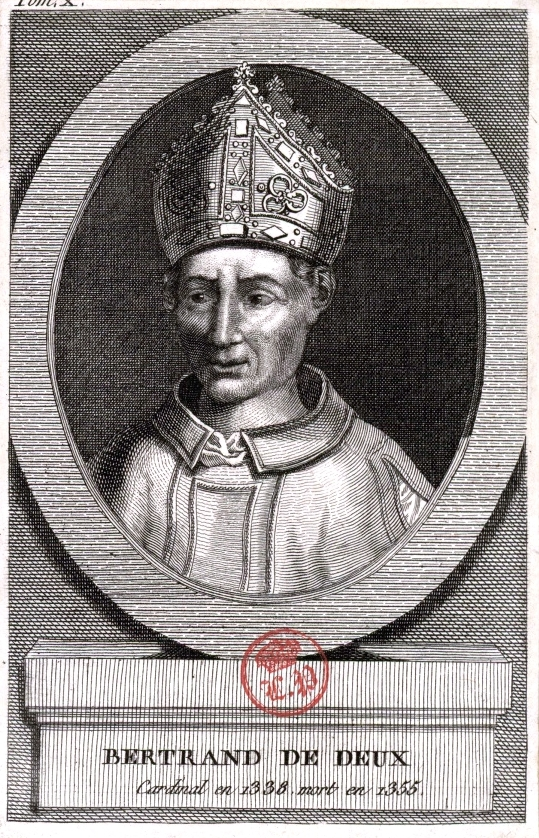
- Church: San Marco (1338-1348)
- Diocese: Embrun (1323-1338); Sabina (1348-1355)

Orders
- Created cardinal: 18 December 1338 by Pope Benedict XII

Personal details
- Born: ca. 1290 Castrum de Blandiaco ? Déaulx?
- Died: 21 October 1355 Avignon FR
- Occupation: lawyer, diplomat
- Profession: bishop
- Coat of arms

Bertrand de Déaulx (or Deaulx, or Deux; Lat. Bertrandus de Deucio) was a French bishop, diplomat, and Cardinal. He was born, perhaps around 1290, in Castrum de Blandiaco in the diocese of Uzès; or in Déaulx. He died in Avignon in 1355. Trained as a lawyer and teacher of law, he practiced in the papal courts and became an arbitrator and diplomat for the Papacy. He had several assignments in Italy and one in Catalonia. He was responsible for the reorganization of the University of Montpellier and the granting of revised charters.

== Biography ==
As a young scholar, Bertrand possessed the parish church of S. Marcel de Carretret, but he received a dispensation from his bishop, allowing him to be absent for seven years for the purpose of continuing his studies, with the condition that he be ordained a subdeacon within a year. On 16 September 1312, he was granted a further extension of seven years by Pope Clement V, at the request of Bertrand's uncle, Guillaume de Mandagot, Archbishop of Aix (1311-1313), who became a Cardinal in December 1312. The extension came with the requirement that he be ordained to the priesthood at the end of the seven-year interval. The fourteen years is not surprising, considering that the study for a doctorate in law required some ten years. Bertrand received his legal education at Montpellier and took his degree Doctor Legum on 7 September 1316. He is said to have taught law at the University of Toulouse.

=== Benefices ===
On 12 June 1318 Bertrand de Déaulx, Papal chaplain, was granted a canonry in the Cathedral of Narbonne, with the expectation of a non-sacerdotal prebend. On 13 June, upon the resignation of the incumbent, Pope John XXII appointed him Archdeacon of Corberiensis (Corbières) in the Church of Narbonne. By 10 September 1318 he was Papal Chaplain, Canon of the Cathedral of Embrun, Canon of the Collegiate Church of Fenolheddesio in the diocese of Alet (Electensis), and he possessed the rural church of S. Saturnino in the diocese of Embrun. He was granted a prebend and the office of Provost of the Church of Embrun and was allowed to keep his other benefices, except for the Archdeaconry of Narbonne and the expectation of a benefice in the diocese of Amiens, which he had to relinquish. On 22 June 1322 he is mentioned in the positions of Auditor litterarum contradictarum of the Apostolic Palace (judge), Provost of Embrun, and Archdeacon of Paris. In more than one of these transactions, it is evident that Bertrand's uncle is the moving force.

=== Archbishop ===
On 26 August 1323 he was appointed Archbishop of Embrun.

On 9 December 1327, Archbishop de Déaulx, working in Avignon and still functioning as Auditor, published a lengthy regulation concerning the functions and behavior of procurators representing clients in the court of the Auditor litterarum contradictarum. He supplemented this with another decree on 26 January 1333, requiring that all mandates issued by the Auditor during a case should be recorded in the quaterno, and should have force until cancelled by the Notary of the Audientia after the conclusion of the case.

=== Italy ===
The long papal absence in Avignon had allowed individual lords to expand their interests and make war against one another and against the independent city-states. This situation was due in part by the opposition of Pope John XXII to Louis the Bavarian as claimant to the Empire. On 31 March 1317, he announced that the Pope was the lawful Vicar of the Empire while the throne was vacant, and that all vassals should swear allegiance to him. This they refused to do. In Italy in 1325 Pope John arranged an alliance with Robert of Lucca and the Guelfs of Italy against Louis. In 1327 Louis marched on Italy and was crowned King of Italy in Milan. The Romans demanded the return of the Pope to Rome. Pope John received their delegation on 7 July 1327, and told them only that he would send a reply by nuncios. Rome renounced Robert of Sicily's protection as Papal Vicar for all of Italy, refused his Vicar John permission to enter Rome, and received King Louis instead. Cardinal Giovanni Gaetano Orsini, the Papal Legate in Tuscany, was ordered to hasten to Rome and assist the Nuncios and the Papal Vicar to do what they could to restore the situation. In 1333 Archbishop Bertrand was sent to Italy to arbitrate disagreements between Cardinal Bertrand du Pouget and some Italian lords. He was also to receive the homage of King Robert of Sicily to the Church. This he did on 25 June 1333. Pope John XXII died on Sunday 4 December 1334.

In 1335 the new Pope, Benedict XII, named Archbishop Bertrand Apostolic Nuncio in the Patrimony of St. Peter in central Italy, with the mission of bringing order to the territories of the Church in Italy. His commission is dated 6 May 1335. He arrived in Naples in September 1335, and then made a visit to Benevento. In Rome, where the people appointed him Syndic and defender of the people, he took up the problem of the perpetual war between the Orsini and the Colonna, and imposed a peace on them on 13 January 1336; meeting in the Aracoeli, both sides swore to observe the truce for two years. During his time in Italy, the Archbishop also undertook to revise the statutes that regulated the temporal government in his area of competence. His work resulted in the Statutes of the March of Ancona. He also had his critics, among them Gentile di Camerino, who wrote directly to the Pope in complaint. Archbishop Bertrand's letter of recall is dated 8 April 1337. King Louis entered into an alliance with Edward III of England against King Philip VI of France and his pope, Benedict XII.

=== Cardinal ===
In his only Consistory for the creation of cardinals, on 18 December 1338, Pope Benedict XII named six prelates to the honor. Bertrand de Deaulx was named a Cardinal Priest, and assigned the titulus of San Marco.

On 9 March 1339, Pope Benedict XII issued a bull granting Cardinal Bertrand de Déaulx the task and powers of modifying and reforming the Statutes of the University of Montpellier. This was the perfect task for a lawyer, judge, and alumnus. On 20 July 1339, Cardinal Bertrand issued the new Statutes for the Faculty of Law of the University of Montpellier. His work was not without its critics. The Bishop of Maguelonne, who had traditional rights over the University as diocesan Ordinary, protested and obstructed wherever he could. On one occasion he created a Doctor of Laws of Montpellier, without reference to the Faculty of Law.

Pope Benedict XII died on 25 April 1342. The Conclave to elect his successor took place in the Apostolic Palace in Avignon and began on Sunday 5 May 1342, with eighteen cardinals in attendance, Bertrand de Déaulx among them. The Conclave ended on the morning of Tuesday 7 May, with the election of Cardinal Pierre Roger of Limoges, who had been Chancellor of King Philip VI (1334-1338). He took the name Clement VI. Bertrand is not recorded as having done anything remarkable during the Conclave. Clement VI was crowned on Pentecost Sunday, 19 May 1342.

Bertrand de Déaulx was named Apostolic Legate in the Principality of Catalonia, departing Avignon on 2 June 1344. His purpose was to broker a peace between Peter IV of Aragon and James III of Majorca, who had been driven out of his kingdom in a brief war (1343-1344). Instead of granting a peace, Peter IV seized the Kingdom of Majorca and incorporated it into the Crown of Aragon. Papal intervention was fruitless.

Due to the crisis produced in southern Italy by the murder, on 19 September 1345, of Andreas of Hungary, the husband of Joanna I of Naples, Cardinal Bertrand was appointed Apostolic Legate by Pope Clement VI on 4 March 1346; on 30 March he was named Vicar General of temporalities in the States of the Church. Naples was a papal fief, and the Pope had a major interest in who the next ruler might be. There were several bad possibilities. Cardinal Bertrand set out for Naples as Apostolic Legate on 26 August 1346 and arrived on 20 November. Andrew had produced a posthumous son on 25 December. Clement VI ordered Cardinal Bertrand to return to Avignon on 15 September 1347, and again on 12 October. Cardinal Bertrand returned on 17 November 1348. After the uprising of Cola di Rienzo, he was ordered to Rome by Pope Clement VI to restore the senatorial regime under papal authority.

Having returned to Avignon, Bertrand de Déaulx was promoted to the Order of Cardinal Bishops on 4 November 1348, and granted the suburbicarian See of Sabina.

Pope Clement VI died in the Apostolic Palace in Avignon on 6 December 1352, the Feast of St. Nicholas. Twenty-six cardinals attended the Conclave to elect his successor including Cardinal Bertrand. The Conclave opened on Sunday 16 December. It reached a successful conclusion on Tuesday, 18 December, with the election of Cardinal Étienne Aubert of Limoges, the Cardinal Bishop of Ostia. He was crowned as Pope Innocent VI on Sunday 30 December 1352.

Bertrand de Déaulx died on 21 October 1355 and was interred in the Collegial Church of Saint-Didier in Avignon, which he had endowed. In 1362 his executors received permission from the King of France to create two Chaplains, one in the Cathedral of Nîmes, the other in the Church of S. Maria Nova de Utecia (Uzès).

== Bibliography ==
- Albe, Edmond (1904). Autour de Jean XXII.: Hugues Géraud, évêque de Cahors. L'affaire des poisons et des envoûtements en 1317 (in French). Paris: Société des Études Littéraires, Scientifiques et Artistiques du Lot.
- Aloisi, Ugo (1906). "Benedetto XII e Bertrando arcivescovo Ebredunense riformatore nella Marca d'Ancona". Atti e Memorie della R. Deputazione di Storia Patria per le Province delle Marche. III: 413–439.
- Baluze [Baluzius], Etienne [Stephanus] (1693). Vitae paparum Avenionensium, hoc est, Historia pontificum romanorum qui in Gallia sederunt ab anno Christi MCCCV. usque ad annum MCCCXCIV (in Latin). Vol. Tomus primus. Paris: apud Franciscum Muguet. Nouvelle edition by G. Mollat II (Paris 1927).
- Baluze, Etienne (1693). Vitae Paparum Avenionensium, Hoc est Historia Pontificum Romanorum qui in Gallia sederunt ab anno Christi MCCCV usque ad annum MCCCXCIV (in Latin). Vol. Tomus secundus. Paris: Muguet.
- Baronio, Cesare (1872). Augustin Theiner (ed.). Annales ecclesiastici: A. D. 1-1571 denuo excusi et ad nostra usque tempora perducti ab Augustino Theiner (in Latin). Vol. Tomus vigesimus quartus (24). Paris: Typis et sumptibus Ludovici Guerin. [1313-1333]
- Baronio, Cesare (1872). Augustinus Theiner (ed.). Annales ecclesiastici: A. D. 1-1571 denuo excusi et ad nostra usque tempora perducti ab Augustino Theiner (in Latin). Vol. Tomus vigesimus quintus (25). Barri-Ducis: Typis et sumptibus Ludovici Guerin.[1333-1356]
- Bliss, William H., ed. (1895). Calendar of Entries in the Papal Registers Relating to Great Britain and Ireland: Papal Letters. Vol. II (1305-1342). London: H.M. Stationery Office.
- Bliss, William Henry; Johnson, C. (1897). Calendar of Entries in the Papal Registers Relating to Great Britain and Ireland: Papal Letters. Vol. III (1342-1362). London: H.M. Stationery Office.
- Du Chesne, François (1660). Histoire De Tous Les Cardinaux François De Naissance (in French). Vol. Tome I. Paris: Aux despens de l' Autheur. pp. 465–470.
- Du Chesne, François (1660). Preuves de l' Histoire de tous les cardinaux François de naissance (in French and Latin). Paris: Aux despens de l'Autheur & se vendent chez luy. pp. 311–322.
- Eubel, Konrad (1898). Hierarchia catholica medii aevi: sive Summorum pontificum, S.R.E. cardinalium, ecclesiarum antistitum series ab anno 1198 usque ad annum [1605] perducta e documentis tabularii praesertim Vaticani collecta, digesta (in Latin). Vol. I. Münster: sumptibus et typis librariae Regensbergianae. (second edition 1913).
- Fournier, Marcel (1892). Histoire de la science du droit en France (in French). Vol. Tome III. Paris: L. Larose & Forcel.
- Fournier, Marcel (1891). Les statuts et privilèges des universités françaises depuis leur fondation jusqu'en 1789 (in French and Latin). Vol. Tome II, premiere partie. Paris: L. Larose et Forcel.
- Giordanengo, G. (1974). "Droit féodal et droit romain dans les universités du Midi : l'exemple de Bertrand de Deaux". Mélanges R. Aubenas (in French). Montpellier: 343–349.
- Gregorovius, Ferdinand Gregorovius (1906). A. Hamilton, tr. (ed.). History of the city of Rome in the Middle Ages. Vol. VI, part 1 (1305-1354). London: G. Bell & sons.
- Lützelschwab, Ralf (2007). Flectat cardinales ad velle suum? Clemens VI. und sein Kardinalskolleg: Ein Beitrag zur kurialen Politik in der Mitte des 14. Jahrhunderts (in German). Berlin: De Gruyter. pp. 438–441. ISBN 978-3-486-84130-5.
- Mollat, Guillaume (1968). "Bertrand de Deaulx, jurisconsulte et pacificateur des états de l' Église au XIV^{e} siècle". Archivum Historiae Pontificiae. 6: 393–397. JSTOR 23563679.
- Renouard, Yves (1970). The Avignon papacy, 1305-1403. Hamden CT USA: Archon Books. ISBN 978-0-208-01156-5.
- Reydellet-Guttinger., Chantal (1975). L'administration pontificale dans le duché de Spolète (1305-1352) (in French). Firenze: Leo S. Olschke.
- Rollo-Koster Joëlle (2015). Avignon and Its Papacy, 1309–1417: Popes, Institutions, and Society. New York-London: Rowman & Littlefield Publishers. ISBN 978-1-4422-1534-4.
- Sainte-Marthe, Denis de (OSB) (1725). Gallia Christiana, In Provincias Ecclesiasticas Distributa (in Latin). Vol. Tomus tertius (3). Paris: Ex Typographia Regia.
