= Rinaldo Orsini (cardinal) =

Italian prelate

Rinaldo Orsini (died 6 June 1374) was an Italian prelate during the Avignon Papacy. Born in the 1290s, he was a nephew of Cardinal Napoleone Orsini. He was appointed to succeed his uncle as the cardinal deacon of Sant'Adriano al Foro by Pope Clement VI on 17 December 1350. He held nonresident ecclesiastical posts in Italy, Spain, the Low Countries and England, where he was the archdeacon of Leicester for three months in 1346–1347 and later dean of Salisbury. He died during an epidemic at Avignon.

== Bibliography ==
- Cocks, Terence (1993). "The Archdeacons of Leicester, 1092–1992" (PDF). Transactions of the Leicestershire Archaeological and Historical Society. 67: 27–46. Archived from the original on 20 April 2019.
- Pio, Berardo (2013). "Orsini, Rinaldo". Dizionario Biografico degli Italiani, Volume 79: Nursio–Ottolini Visconti (in Italian). Rome: Istituto dell'Enciclopedia Italiana. ISBN 978-8-81200032-6.
