= Avignon Cathedral =

Cathedral in Avignon, France

Cathedral of Our Lady of Doms Cathédrale Notre-Dame des Doms d'Avignon
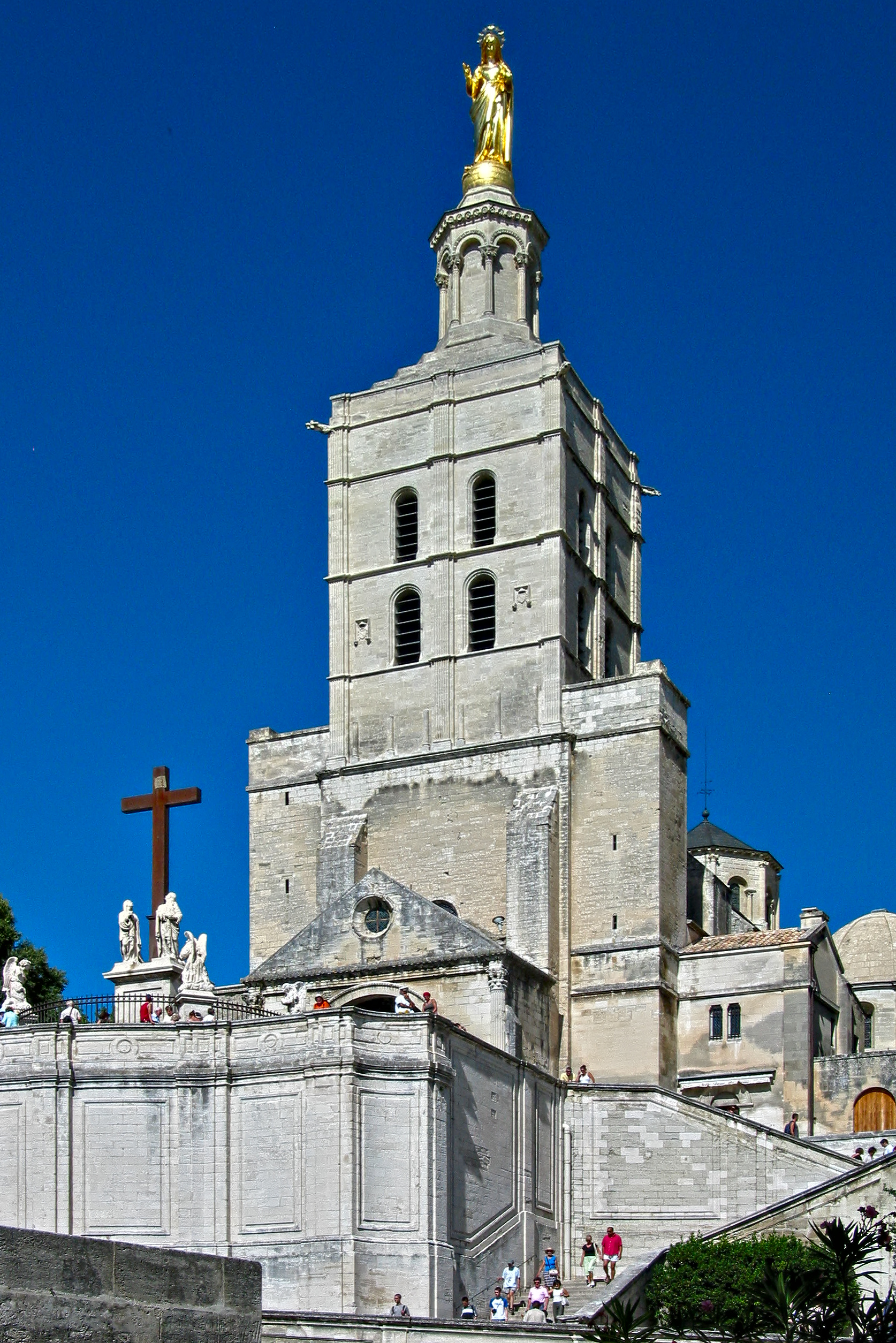
- Avignon Cathedral

Religion
- Affiliation: Roman Catholic Church
- Diocese: Archdiocese of Avignon
- Rite: Roman
- Ecclesiastical or organizational status: Cathedral

Location
- Location: Avignon, France
- Interactive map of Cathedral of Our Lady of Doms; Cathédrale Notre-Dame des Doms d'Avignon
- Coordinates: 43°57′06″N 4°48′27″E

Architecture
- Type: Church
- Style: Romanesque, Gothic
- Groundbreaking: 12th century
- Completed: 1425
- UNESCO World Heritage Site
- Official name: Historic Centre of Avignon: Papal Palace, Episcopal Ensemble and Avignon Bridge
- Type: Cultural
- Criteria: i, ii, iv
- Designated: 1995
- Reference no.: 228
- State Party: France

Website
- Official Website

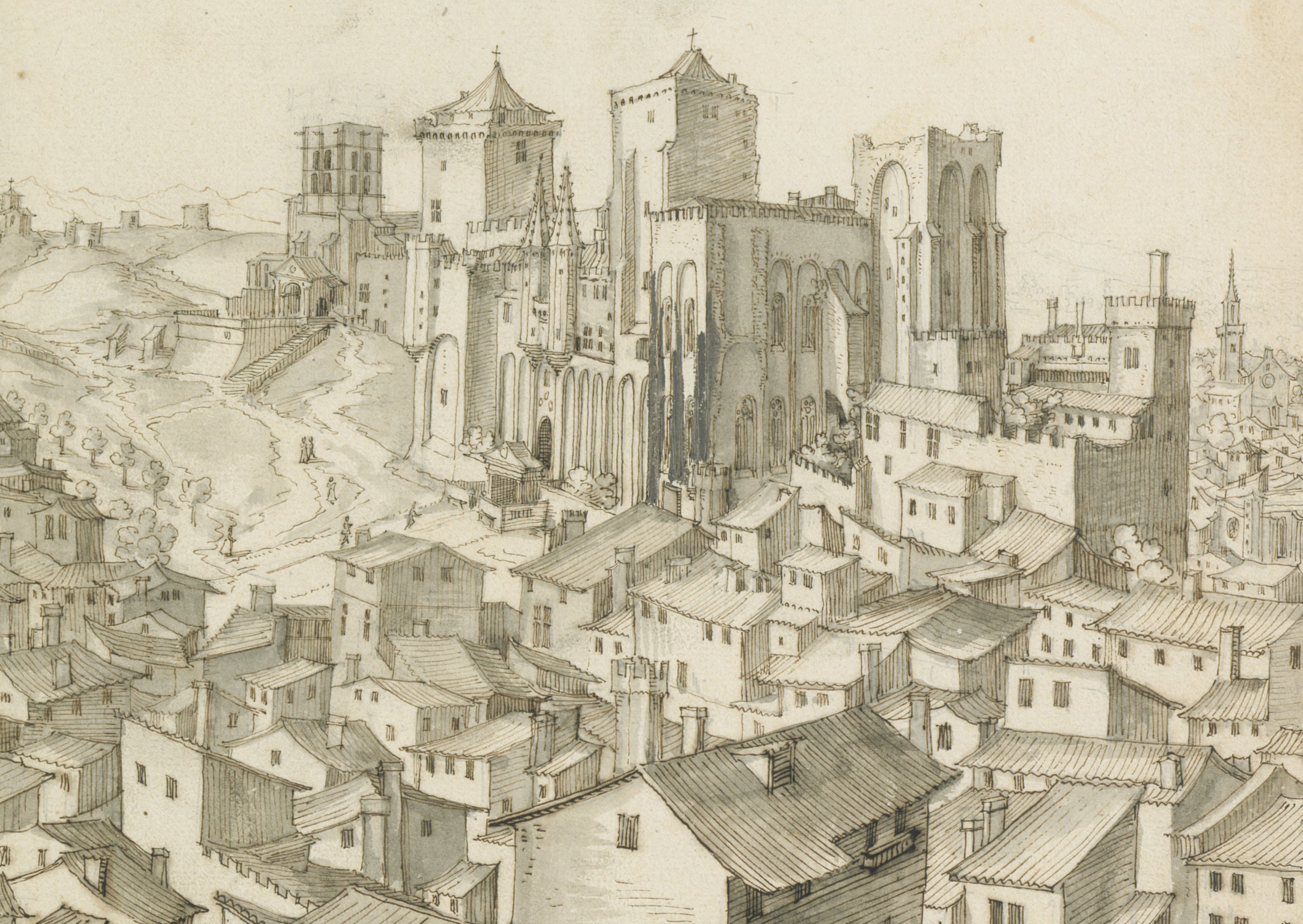
Detail of a drawing by Étienne Martellange dating from the first quarter of the 17th century. The cathedral is at the top left, beyond the Palais des Papes.

Avignon Cathedral (French: Cathédrale Notre-Dame des Doms d'Avignon; Occitan: Catedral Nòstra Dama dels Dòms d'Avinhon) is a Roman Catholic church located next to the Palais des Papes in Avignon, France. The cathedral is the seat of the Archbishop of Avignon.

The cathedral is a Romanesque building, constructed primarily in the second half of the 12th century. The bell tower collapsed in 1405 and was rebuilt in 1425. In 1670–1672 the apse was rebuilt and extended. The extension led to the destruction of the medieval cloister.

The building was abandoned and allowed to deteriorate during the Revolution, but it was reconsecrated in 1822 and restored by the archbishop Célestin Dupont in 1835–1842. The most prominent feature of the cathedral is a gilded statue of the Virgin Mary atop the bell tower which was erected in 1859. The interior contains many works of art. The most famous of these is the mausoleum of Pope John XXII (died 1334), a 14th-century Gothic edifice. It was moved in 1759, damaged during the Revolution, and restored to its original position in 1840. The cathedral was listed as a Monument historique in 1840. In 1995, the cathedral, along with the Palais des Papes and other historic buildings in the Avignon city center, became a UNESCO World Heritage Site because of its outstanding architecture and its importance during the 14th and 15th centuries.

== See also ==
- High medieval domes
- Avignon Papacy

== Sources ==
- Girard, Joseph (1958). Évocation du Vieil Avignon (in French). Paris: Les Éditions de Minuit. OCLC 5391399.
