= 1317 =

1317 in various calendars
- Gregorian calendar: 1317; MCCCXVII
- Ab urbe condita: 2070
- Armenian calendar: 766; ԹՎ ՉԿԶ
- Assyrian calendar: 6067
- Balinese saka calendar: 1238–1239
- Bengali calendar: 723–724
- Berber calendar: 2267
- English Regnal year: 10 Edw. 2 – 11 Edw. 2
- Buddhist calendar: 1861
- Burmese calendar: 679
- Byzantine calendar: 6825–6826
- Chinese calendar: 丙辰年 (Fire Dragon); 4014 or 3807 — to — 丁巳年 (Fire Snake); 4015 or 3808
- Coptic calendar: 1033–1034
- Discordian calendar: 2483
- Ethiopian calendar: 1309–1310
- Hebrew calendar: 5077–5078
- Hindu calendars
- Vikram Samvat: 1373–1374
- Shaka Samvat: 1238–1239
- Kali Yuga: 4417–4418
- Holocene calendar: 11317
- Igbo calendar: 317–318
- Iranian calendar: 695–696
- Islamic calendar: 716–717
- Japanese calendar: Shōwa 6 / Bunpō 1 (文保元年)
- Javanese calendar: 1228–1229
- Julian calendar: 1317; MCCCXVII
- Korean calendar: 3650
- Minguo calendar: 595 before ROC 民前595年
- Nanakshahi calendar: −151
- Thai solar calendar: 1859–1860
- Tibetan calendar: མེ་ཕོ་འབྲུག་ལོ་ (male Fire-Dragon); 1443 or 1062 or 290 — to — མེ་མོ་སྦྲུལ་ལོ་ (female Fire-Snake); 1444 or 1063 or 291

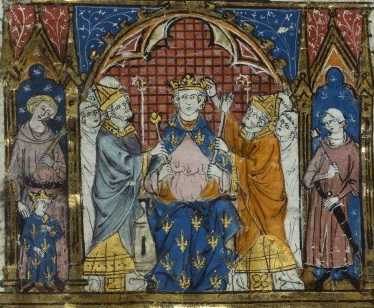
January 9, 1317: Philip the Tall is crowned as King of France and Navarre.

Year 1317 (MCCCXVII) was a common year starting on Saturday of the Julian calendar.

== Events ==
=== January – March ===
- January 9 – The 23-year-old Philip the Tall, younger brother of the late King Louis X of France, is hastily crowned King of France, as King Philip V, at Rheims. The only son of King Louis X had been born posthumously, but died after four days. Supporters of King Louis felt that his eldest daughter, Joan II of Navarre, should have been crowned as the monarch. Mass protests follow in Artois, Champagne and Burgundy. The coronation of a brother, instead of the eldest daughter, as the successor to the throne sets the precedent for the Salic law, providing that the eldest male heir inherits the throne. Philip V reorganizes the French army by extending the military obligations of the realm. Each town and castellany is responsible for providing a specified number of fully equipped troops – such as sergeants and infantry militias, while towns in economically advanced areas like Flanders become a major source of men and money. At the same time, the arriére ban (military recruitment) is generally commuted in favour for taxation.
- February 1 – Manuel Pessanha of Genoa is appointed as the first Chief Admiral of Portugal (Almirante-mor) by King Denis, and charged with organizing a permanent navy for the kingdom, with 20 warships and hiring Genoese captains to recruit sailors. The organization of the Portuguese Royal Navy is completed by December 12.
- February 16 – (10th day of 1st month of 6 Shōwa) An earthquake of estimated 7.0 magnitude strikes Kyoto. On February 22, an aftershock of 6.0 magnitude follows the first quake.
- March 15 – Pope John XXII admonishes King Frederick III of Sicily to take severe measures against the Fraticelli, the Spiritual Franciscans who have broken with the Roman Catholic Church doctrine.
- March 17 – In Germany, Waldemar the Great becomes the sole ruler of the reunited Margraviate of Brandenburg upon the death of his cousin, John V, Margrave of Brandenburg-Salzwedel. Waldemar had been the Margrave of Brandenburg-Stendal since 1308.
- March 23 – In France, Hugues Géraud, the Roman Catholic Bishop of Cahors, is arrested along with plotting to assassinate Pope John XXII (with poisoned bread) and to use evil magic against him and two of his advisors, Bertrand du Pouget and Gaucelme de Jean. Following a trial, Géraud is convicted of witchcraft and sacrilege, and executed on August 30.
- March 31 – Pope John XXII claims imperial rights of government in Italy for the papacy. He erects the dioceses of Luçon, Maillezais, and Tulle and issues the decretal Spondent Pariter prohibiting alchemy.

=== April – June ===
- April 7 – Louis of Toulouse is canonized as a saint in the Roman Catholic Church by Pope John XXII.
- April 8 – Fakhr al-Din al-Qibti is appointed Emir of Egypt.
- April 11 – In Italy's Republic of Massa, coinage is resumed by arrangement of the Republic and of the Benzi family.
- April 27 – John XXII orders the Spiritual Franciscans, including the French priest Bernard Délicieux, to come to Avignon and answer for their disobedience. Upon arrival, Délicieux is arrested and interrogated.
- May 13 – King Edward II restores the dower lands that had been surrendered by Margaret de Clare, widow of Piers Gaveston.
- May 22 – Pursuant to the papal order of April 27, the first of the Spiritual Franciscans (Fraticelli) appear before Pope John XXII to be confronted over their disobedience.
- June 13 – Cardinal Jacques de Via, Bishop of Avignon and nephew of Pope John XXII, is found dead. A court will conclude on August 30 that de Via was murdered by witchcraft.
- June 23 – Thawun Gyi, Burmese monarch of the principality of Toungoo, is assassinated by his younger brother, Thawun Nge, who takes his place.

=== July – September ===
- July 5 – Mongol Prince Abu Sa'id Bahadur Khan becomes the ruler of the Ilkhanate, the Mongol-controlled area of the Middle East.
- July 22 – Alexander de Bicknor is consecrated by the Pope as the Archbishop of Dublin.
- August 21 – Hugues Géraud, the Catholic Bishop of Cahors who is implicated in a plot to assassinate Pope John XXII, is personally questioned by the Pope. Géraud is convicted on August 30 of witchcraft, sacrilege and the June 13 murder of Cardinal Jacques de Via, and is burned at the stake as punishment.
- September 1 – Near Rushyford in County Durham, English knight Gilbert Middleton begins a rebellion against King Edward II. Middleton attacks and takes hostage the newly elected Bishop of Durham, Louis de Beaumont, Louis' brother Henry de Beaumont, and two cardinals, Gauscelin de Jean and Luca Fieschi. The cardinals are set free, while the Beaumonts are imprisoned at Mitford Castle for the next seven weeks.

=== October – December ===
- October 7 – Pope John XXII issues the bull Quorundam exigit, imposing a more lenient treatment of supporters of the Franciscan cause of "unconditional poverty".
- October 17 – Sir Gilbert Middleton releases the Bishop of Durham, Louis de Beaumont, and the bishop's brother Henry after being paid a ransom of 500 marks (2,000 troy ounces) of silver.
- November 9 – William II, son of King Frederick III of Sicily, becomes the new Duke of Athens upon the death of his older brother, Manfred of Sicily.
- November 13 – Yahballaha III, Patriarch of the Church of the East in Byzantium, dies after serving 26 years as leader of the Eastern Orthodox Church. Timothy II of Seleucia-Ctesiphon will be elected to succeed him.
- November 25 – Treaty of Templin: After ending the war between the Margraviate of Brandenburg and Denmark, Brandenburg is forced to negotiate a truce. King Eric VI, his ally Duke Henry the Lion and Waldemar the Great sign a peace treaty in Templin. Brandenburg agrees to transfer Burg Stargard and Arnsberg castle to Mecklenburg. They also surrender the territories of Schlawe-Stolp, located on the Baltic coast, to Pomerania.
- December 11 – King Birger Magnusson has his brothers, Dukes Eric Magnusson and Valdemar Magnusson, captured and thrown into a dungeon during the Nyköping Banquet – as a revenge for their imprisonment of him in the Håtuna games (see 1306). As the brothers soon starve to death in the dungeon, their followers rebel against Birger, throwing Sweden into civil war.
- December 12 – The Portuguese Royal Navy, with 20 warships, is created by order of King Denis. The Navy has 20 armed galleys as warships, under the command of Admiral Manuel Pessanha and will celebrate its 700th anniversary in 2017 as the oldest continuously serving navy in the world.

=== Date unknown ===
- A Hungarian document mentions for the first time Basarab I as leader of Wallachia (historians estimate he was on the throne since about 1310). Basarab will become the first voivode of Wallachia as an independent state, and founder of the House of Basarab (until 1352).
- The Great Famine of 1315–1317 comes to an end. Crop harvests return to normal – but it will be another five years before food supplies are completely replenished in Northern Europe. Simultaneously, the people are so weakened by diseases such as pneumonia, bronchitis, and tuberculosis. Historians debate the toll, but it is estimated that 10–25% of the population of many cities and towns dies.

== Births ==
- March 21 – Isabel de Verdun, English noblewoman (House of Clare) (d. 1349)
- date unknown
  - Blanche of Valois, queen consort of Germany and Bohemia (d. 1348)
  - Euphemia of Sweden, Swedish noblewoman and princess (d. 1370)
  - Coloman, Hungarian nobleman, prince, prelate and bishop (d. 1375)
  - Godfrey de Foljambe, English nobleman and Chief Justice (d. 1376)
  - Ichijō Tsunemichi, Japanese nobleman (kugyō) and regent (d. 1365)
  - John II, Sicilian nobleman and prince (House of Barcelona) (d. 1348)
  - Michael Szécsényi, Hungarian nobleman, cleric and bishop (d. 1377)
  - Ralph de Spigurnell, English nobleman, knight and admiral (d. 1373)
  - Vuk Kosača, Bosnian nobleman (knyaz), magnate and ruler (d. 1359)

== Deaths ==
- February 6 – Brinolfo Algotsson, Swedish bishop and theologian (b. 1240)
- February 7 – Robert de Clermont, French nobleman and prince (b. 1256)
- February 11 – Ralph Fitzwilliam, English nobleman and knight (b. 1256)
- April 6 – Guy IV, French nobleman and Grand Butler (House of Châtillon)
- April 19 – Nitchō, Japanese Buddhist monk, cleric and scholar (b. 1252)
- April 20 – Agnes of Montepulciano, Italian prioress and saint (b. 1268)
- May 23 – Guy of Avesnes, French bishop (House of Avesnes) (b. 1253)
- June 23 – Thawun Gyi, Burmese founder and ruler of Toungoo (b. 1258)
- June 25 – Henry of Harclay, English philosopher and chancellor (b. 1270)
- August 14 – Bernard de Castanet, French diplomat and bishop (b. 1240)
- September 21 – Viola of Teschen, queen consort of Bohemia and Poland
- October 8 – Fushimi, Japanese emperor and calligrapher (b. 1265)
- October 26 – Alice of Hainault, French noblewoman (House of Avesnes)
- November 9 – Manfred of Sicily, Sicilian nobleman and prince (b. 1306)
- November 13 – Yahballaha III, Turkic patriarch of the Church of the East
- November 28 – Yishan Yining, Chinese monk and calligrapher (b. 1247)
- December 15 – Maria of Bytom, queen consort of Hungary and Croatia
- December 24 – Jean de Joinville, French historian and writer (b. 1224)
- date unknown
  - Dujam II, Croatian nobleman and oligarch (House of Frankopan)
  - Gerard of Bologna, Italian Carmelite theologian and philosopher
  - Guillemette of Neufchâtel, Swiss noblewoman (suo jure) (b. 1260)
  - Irene Violante of Montferrat, Byzantine empress consort (b. 1274)
  - John I Orsini, Latin nobleman, knight and ruler (House of Orsini)
  - John the Illustrious, German nobleman and knight (b. 1302)
  - Malise III of Strathearn, Scottish nobleman and politician (b. 1257)
  - Parsoma ("the Naked"), Egyptian Coptic hermit and saint (b. 1257)
  - Ram Khamhaeng the Great, Tai ruler of Sukhothai (b. 1239)
  - Robert of Burgundy, French nobleman and knight (b. 1300)
  - Roger Brabazon, English lawyer and Chief Justice (b. 1247)
  - Stephen de Dunnideer, English bishop-elect
  - Tolberto III, Italian nobleman (House of Caminesi) (b. 1263)
  - Wolfert II van Borselen, Dutch nobleman and knight (b. 1280)
