= Ultragotha =

Frankish queen

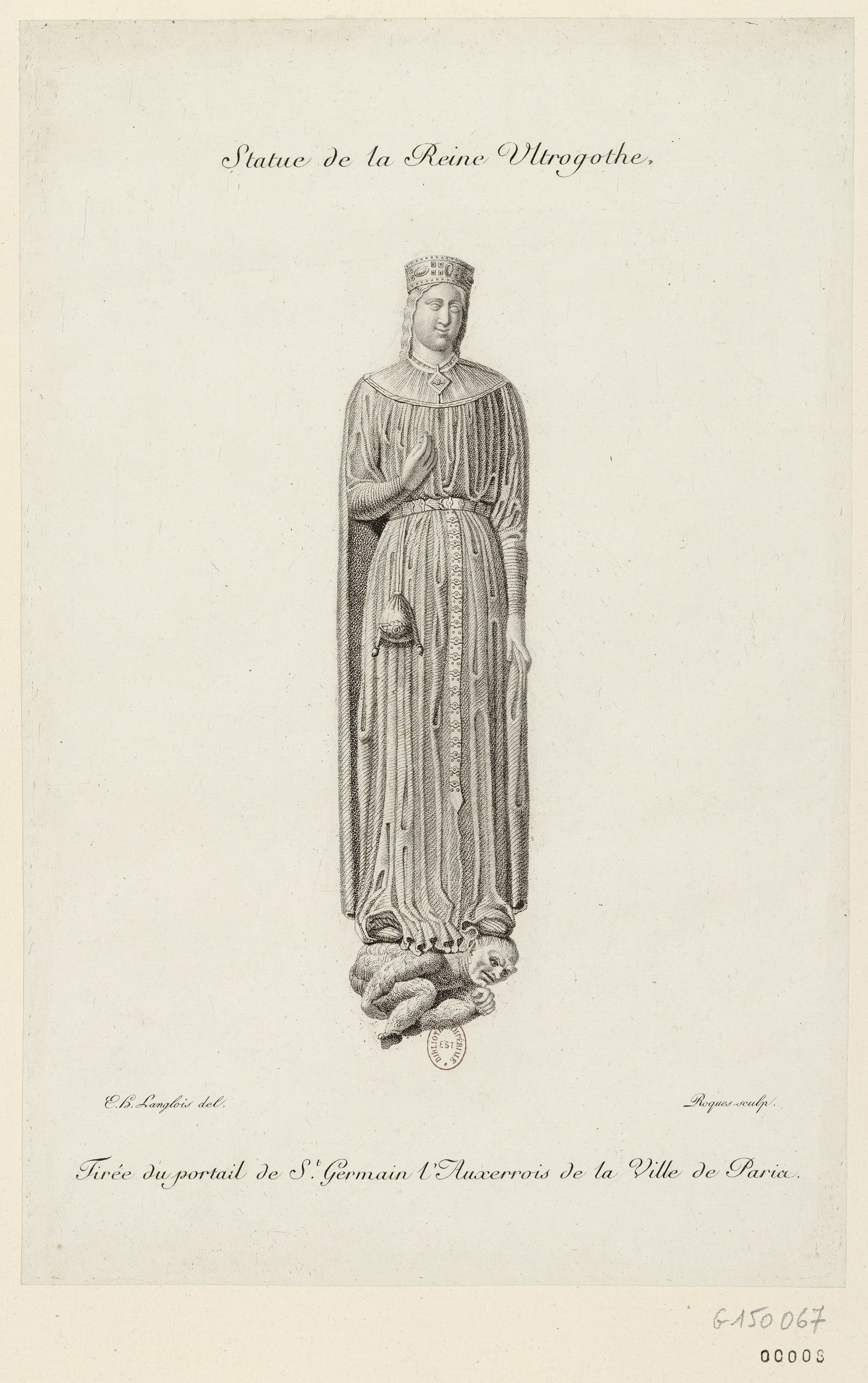
- Drawing of the statue of the queen Ultrogothe on the portal of the church Saint-Germain l'Auxerrois

Queen consort of Paris
- Tenure: 27 November 511 – 23 December 558
- Born: c. 496
- Died: after 566; Paris
- Burial: Abbey of Saint-Germain-des-Prés
- Spouse: Childebert I
- Issue: Chrodoberge; Chrodesinde
- Dynasty: Merovingian
- Religion: Nicene Christianity

Ultragotha (or Ultrogothe, c. 496 – after 566/567) was a Frankish queen of the Merovingian dynasty via her marriage to Childebert I, reigning from c. 541 to 558. They had two daughters, possibly named Chrodoberge and Chrodesinde.

When Childebert died in 558, his brother Clotaire I seized his kingdom and took control of the Palais de la Cité in Paris, where the royal treasures and the family of the deceased were. According to Gregory of Tours, he then condemned Ultragotha and the two daughters to prison. Upon reuniting the kingdom of Clovis, Clotaire I freed them; the daughters likely became nuns. She died in around 567 and was buried in the St-Germain-des-Prés along with Childebert. The two daughters are also buried there.

In 580, again according to Gregory of Tours, Ultragotha's former Chancellor, Ursicinus, was chosen by Maurilio, bishop of Cahors, as his successor.

== Sources ==
- Gregory of Tours. The History of the Franks. 2 vol. trans. O. M. Dalton. Oxford: Clarendon Press, 1967.
