= Cardinals created by John XXII =

Catholic appointments from 1316 to 1334

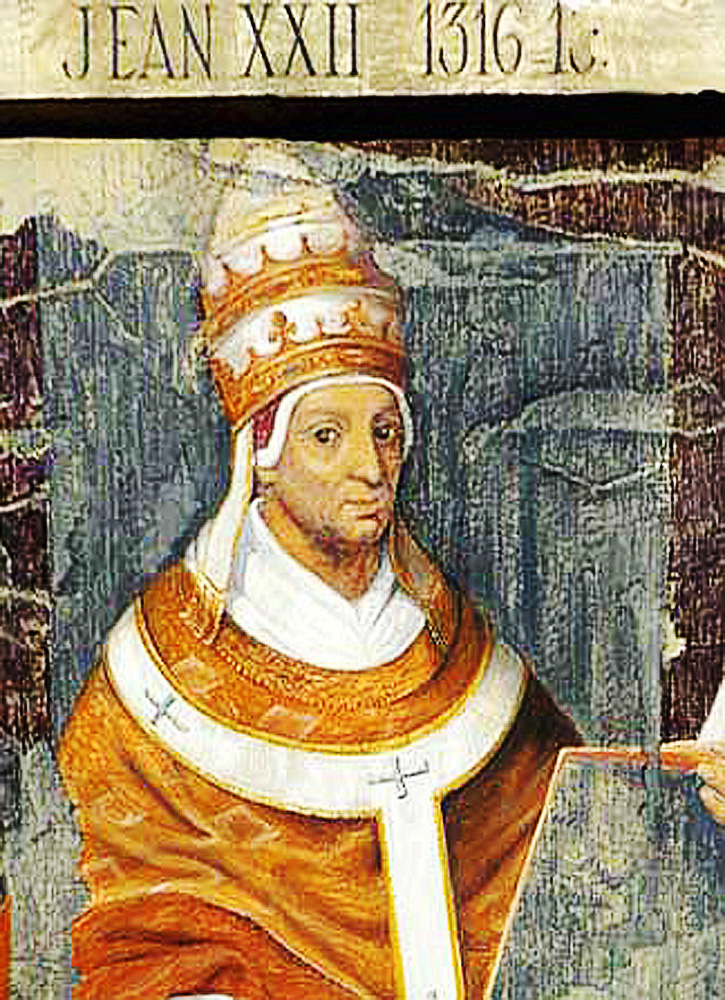
Pope John XXII (r. 1316–1334)

Pope John XXII (r. 1316–1334) created 28 new cardinals in six consistories:

== 18 December 1316 ==
1. Bernard de Castanet, bishop of Le Puy – cardinal-bishop of Porto e S. Rufina, † 14 August 1317.
2. Jacques de Via, nephew of John XXII, bishop Avignon – cardinal-priest of SS. Giovanni e Paolo, † 13 June 1317.
3. Gauscelin de Jean, relative of John XXII – cardinal-priest of SS. Marcellino e Pietro, then cardinal-bishop of Albano (18 December 1327), † 3 August 1348.
4. Bertrand du Pouget – cardinal-priest of S. Marcello, then cardinal-bishop of Ostia e Velletri (18 December 1327), † 3 February 1352.
5. Pierre d'Arrabloy – cardinal-priest of S. Susanna (received the title on 29 March 1317), then cardinal-bishop of Porto e S. Rufina (18 December 1327), † in March 1331.
6. Bertrand de Montfavez – cardinal-deacon of S. Maria in Aquiro, † 1 December 1342.
7. Gaillard de la Mothe – cardinal-deacon of S. Lucia in Silice, † 20 December 1356.
8. Gian Gaetano Orsini – cardinal-deacon of S. Teodoro, † 27 August 1335.

== 20 June 1317 ==
1. Arnaud de Via, nephew of John XXII – cardinal-deacon of S. Eustachio, † 24 November 1335.

== 20 December 1320 ==
The new cardinals received their titles probably in February 1321:

1. Regnaud de la Porte, archbishop of Bourges – cardinal-priest of SS. Nereo ed Achilleo, then cardinal-bishop of Ostia e Velletri (1 August 1321), † in August 1325.
2. Bertrand de la Tour, O.F.M., archbishop of Salerno – cardinal-priest of S. Vitale, then cardinal-bishop of Tusculum (1323), † 1333
3. Pierre Desprès, archbishop of Aix – cardinal-priest of S. Pudenziana, then cardinal-bishop of Palestrina (10 May 1322), † 16 May 1361.
4. Simon d'Archiac, archbishop-elect of Vienne – cardinal-priest of S. Prisca, † 14 May 1323.
5. Pilfort de Rabastens, O.S.B., bishop of Rieux – cardinal-priest of S. Anastasia, † 14 July 1324
6. Pierre Le Tessier, C.R.S.A. – cardinal-priest of S. Stefano al Monte Celio, † 22 March 1325.
7. Raymond Le Roux – cardinal-deacon of S. Maria in Cosmedin, † 31 October 1325.

== 18 December 1327 ==
1. Jean-Raymond de Comminges, archbishop of Toulouse – cardinal-priest of S. Vitale, then cardinal-bishop of Porto e S. Rufina (15 March 1331), † 20 November 1348
2. Annibaldo di Ceccano, archbishop of Naples – cardinal-priest of S. Lorenzo in Lucina, then cardinal-bishop of Tusculum (February 1333), † 17 July 1350.
3. Jacques Fournier, O.Cist., bishop of Mirapoix – cardinal-priest of S. Prisca, then Pope Benedict XII (20 December 1334), † 25 April 1342
4. Raymond de Mostuéjouls, O.S.B., bishop of St.-Papoul – cardinal-priest of S. Eusebio, † 12 November 1337.
5. Pierre de Mortemart, bishop of Auxerre – cardinal-priest of S. Stefano al Monte Celio, † 14 April 1335.
6. Pierre des Chappes, bishop of Chartres – cardinal-priest of SS. Silvestro e Martino, † 24 March 1336.
7. Matteo Orsini di Monte Giordano, O.P., archbishop of Manfredonia – cardinal-priest of SS. Giovanni e Paolo, then cardinal-bishop of Sabina (18 December 1338), † 18 August 1340.
8. Pedro Gómez de Barroso, bishop of Cartagena – cardinal-priest of S. Prassede, then cardinal-bishop of Sabina (1340), † 14 July 1348.
9. Imbert Dupuis – cardinal-priest of SS. XII Apostoli, † 26 May 1348.
10. Giovanni Colonna – cardinal-deacon of S. Angelo in Pescheria, † 3 July 1348.

== 25 May 1331 ==
1. Hélie de Talleyrand-Périgord – cardinal-priest of S. Pietro in Vincoli (received the title in June 1331), then cardinal-bishop of Albano (4 November 1348) † 17 January 1364.

== 20 December 1331 ==
1. Pierre Bertrand d'Annonay, bishop of Autun – cardinal-priest of S. Clemente, † 23 June 1348.

== Sources ==
- Konrad Eubel: Hierarchia Catholica, I, Münster 1913
- Etienne Blauze: Vitae paparum avenionensium, vols. I-II, ed. G. Mollat, 1914
- Miranda, Salvador. "Consistories for the creation of Cardinals 14th Century (1303-1404): John XXII (1316-1334)". The Cardinals of the Holy Roman Church. Florida International University. OCLC 53276621.
- Lettres communes
