= Hôtel de Ville, Cahors =

Town hall in Cahors, France

Hôtel de Ville
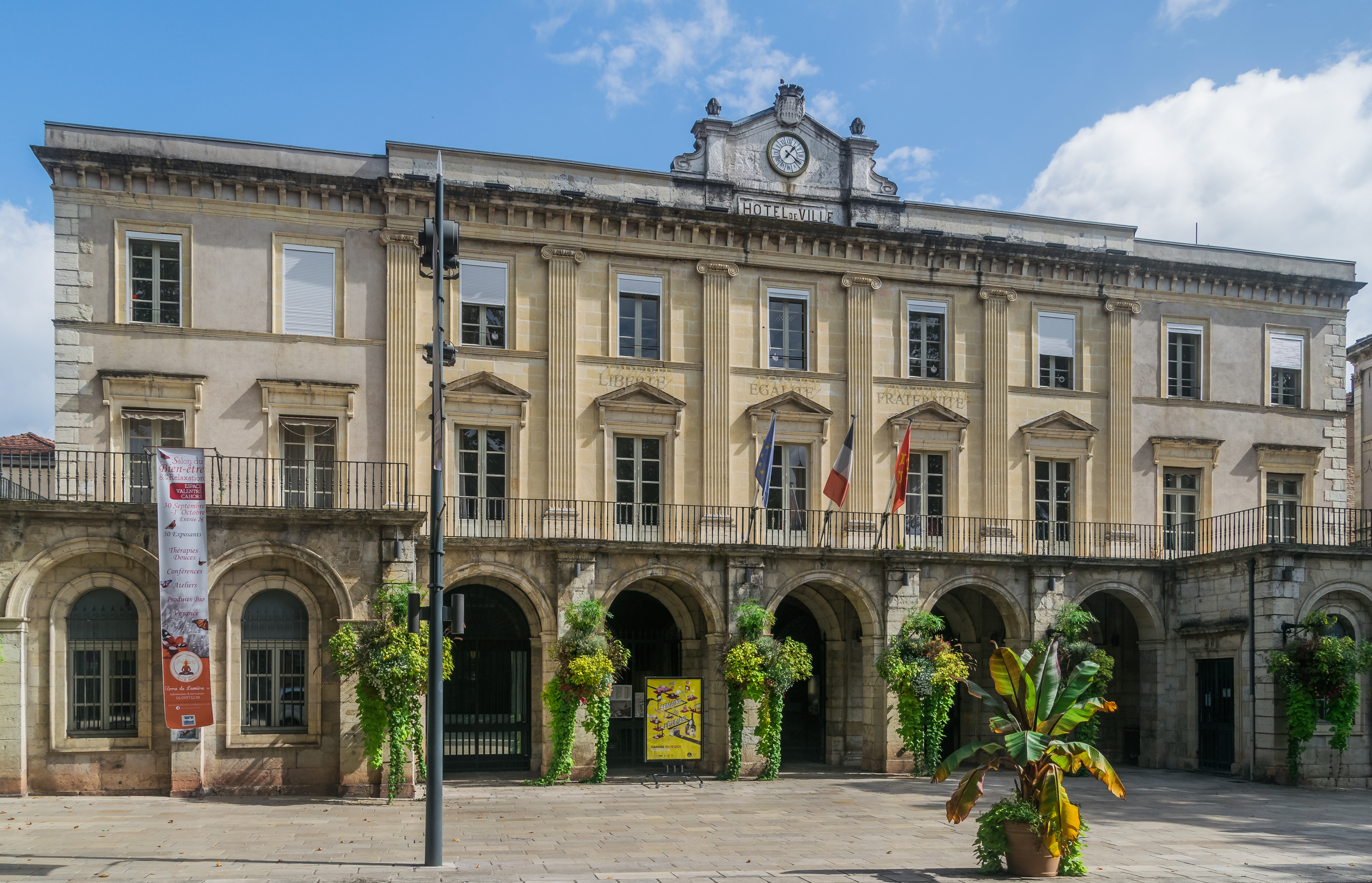
- The main frontage of the Hôtel de Ville in September 2017

General information
- Type: City hall
- Architectural style: Neoclassical style
- Location: Cahors, France
- Coordinates: 44.4468°N 1.4410°E
- Completed: 1840

Design and construction
- Architect: Charles Hector Malo

Monument historique
- Official name: Hôtel de ville
- Type: Inscrit
- Designated: 1975
- Reference no.: PA00095003

The Hôtel de Ville (French pronunciation: [otɛl də vil], City Hall) is a municipal building in Cahors, Lot, in southwestern France, standing on Boulevard Léon-Gambetta. It was designated a monument historique by the French government in 1975.

== History ==
The first municipal building in the town, known as "the Consulate" on account of its use as the meeting place of the local consuls, was in the centre of the market square (now Place Jean-Jacques Chapou) in the heart of the medieval part of the town; it dated back at least to the 13th century. The building, which faced the Cathedral of Saint-Saint-Étienne, was in a dilapidated condition by the early 14th century and the consuls commissioned a local mason to rebuild it. By the late 15th century, the ground floor of the building was being let for retail use. After the old consulate was destroyed in a major fire on 6 December 1686, the consuls secured the use of two buildings approximately 100 metres (330 ft) west of the old market square. The old consulate was then demolished in November 1719.

After the Court of Aids was removed to Montauban in 1662, the consuls acquired the buildings that had previously been used by the court on the east side of Rue de le Fondue (now Rue Fondue Haute) and converted them for municipal use in 1686. Following the French Revolution, Boulevard Léon-Gambetta became the main thoroughfare of the town bringing together many of the main public buildings there. In the mid-1830s, the town council led by the mayor, Étienne Brives, decided to commission a new town hall on a site between Boulevard Léon-Gambetta and Rue de le Fondue. Construction of the new building, which was connected to the old municipal buildings on the east side of Rue de le Fondue, started in 1837. It was designed by Charles Hector Malo in the neoclassical style, built in ashlar stone and was completed in 1840.

The design involved a symmetrical main frontage of nine bays facing onto the street, with the central section of five bays slighted projected forward and the last two bays on either side significantly projected forward as single storey wings. The ground floor was arcaded with nine round-headed openings allowing access to the main structure. On the first floor, there were nine French doors with a wide balcony, the central five being surmounted by pediments, while the outer four were surmounted by cornices. The second floor was fenestrated by casement windows with moulded surrounds. The bays in the central section were flanked by fluted Ionic order pilasters supporting a modillioned cornice and, at roof level, there was a parapet and a clock above the central bay.

Internally, the principal rooms were the Salle du Conseil (council chamber), the Salle des Mariages (wedding room) and the Salle des Réceptions (reception room). A lift was installed at a cost of €478,000 to ensure greater accessibility to these rooms in summer 2013.
