= Ursicinus of Cahors =

Ursicinus of Cahors or Urcis or Saint Urcsicinus was a bishop of Cahors from the early 580s until his death in around 595. His feast day is on December 13. Ursicinus was the chancellor of queen Ultragotha, wife of Childebert I, king of Paris. He was chosen by Maurilio, then-bishop of Cahors, to be his successor.

In 585, the Second Synod of Mâcon, assembled at the request of king Guntram of Orléans, began to conduct trials of those who had declared themselves in favor of the rebel Gundowald, who claimed to be the son of Clothar I. Ursicinus publicly confessed to having received Gundowald and having declared himself in his favor. The synod sentenced him to three years' penance. During this penance he had to let his beard and hair grow (priests of the time wore tonsure and no beard), not to consume meat and wine, not to celebrate mass, not to ordain priests, nor to consecrate churches or bless bread. During this penance, St. Gregory of Tours recounts an event as one indicative of the greed of bishops of the era. Innocent, count of Gévaudan and elected bishop of Rodez under pressure from Brunhilda of Austrasia, attempting to claim more land, accused Ursicinus of unjustly holding parishes that should be under the bishopric of Rodez. To judge this dispute, Sulpitius, the archbishop of Bourges, convened a council in Clermont in 587. It was decided there that the bishop of Cahors would keep the parishes for which the bishop of Rodez could not prove that a bishop of Rodez had exercised his authority there.
