= Collegiate Church of Notre-Dame, Villeneuve-lès-Avignon =

Church in Gard, France

Coordinates: 43°57′48″N 4°47′48″E

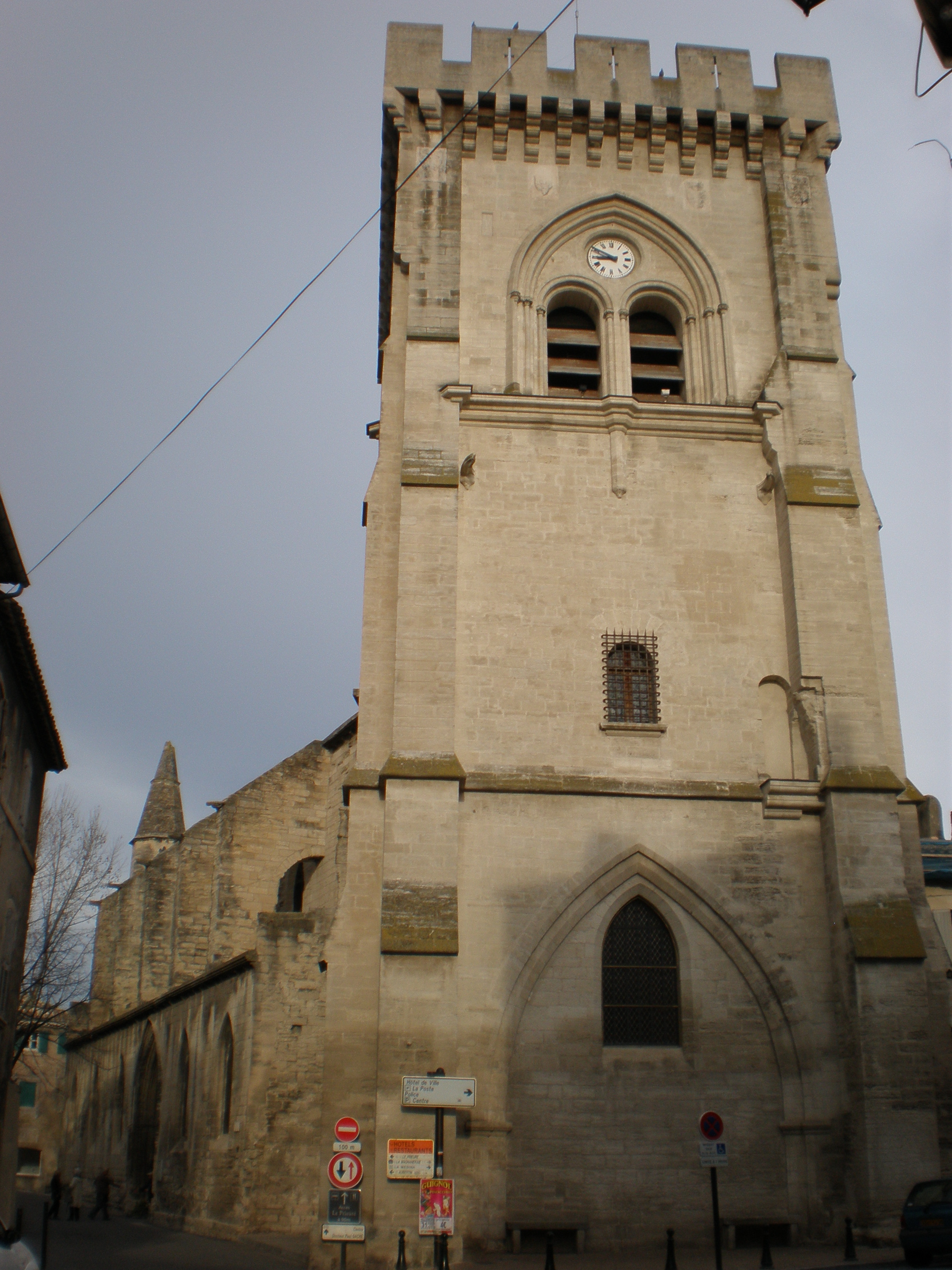
The church

The Collegiate Church of Notre-Dame (French: Collégiale Notre-Dame) is a Gothic church in Villeneuve-lès-Avignon, Gard, Occitanie, France.

== History ==
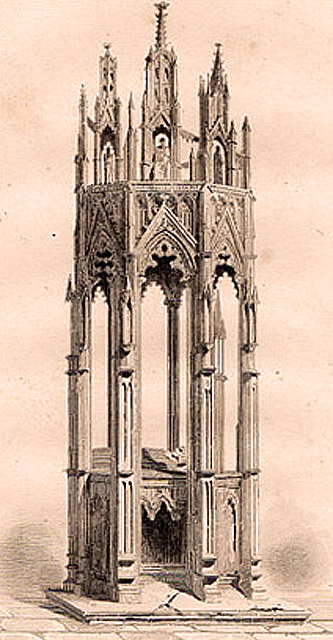
Arnaud de Via's tomb, 1845 engraving.

It was completed in 1314 and consecrated in 1333 by cardinal Arnaud de Via, bishop of Cahors, and nephew of Pope John XXII. A bell tower was added in 1362. The church and its cloister were made a monument historique in 1862.

== Bibliography (in French) ==
- Joseph Girard, Évocation du Vieil Avignon, Les éditions de Minuit, Paris, 1958, p. 364-368
- Jean-Marie Pérouse de Montclos (ed.), Le guide du patrimoine Languedoc Roussillon, Hachette, Paris, 2006, p. 574, ISBN 978-2-01-242333-6
- Léon-Honoré Labande, "La collégiale de Notre-Dame"., in Congrès archéologique de France, 76^{e} session. Avignon. 1909, Société française d'archéologie, Paris, 1910, tome 1, Guide du congrès, p. 141-144
- Francis Salet, "L'église Notre-Dame de Villeneuve-lès-Avignon", dans Congrès archéologique de France. 121^{e} session. Avignon et le Comtat Venaissin. 1963, Société française d'archéologie, Paris, 1963, p. 177-190
- Marie-Luce Fabrié, "La collégiale Notre-Dame de Villeneuve-lez-Avignon", dans Congrès archéologique de France, 157^{e} session. Gard. 1999, Société française d'archéologie, Paris, 2000, p. 455-465
- Hervé Aliquot, Cyr Harispe, Collégiale d'Arnaud de Via. Un paradis de pierres à Villeneuve-lès-Avignon, Éditions École palatine, Avignon, 2010, ISBN 978-2-95224773-3
