= Sulpitius I of Bourges =

French bishop

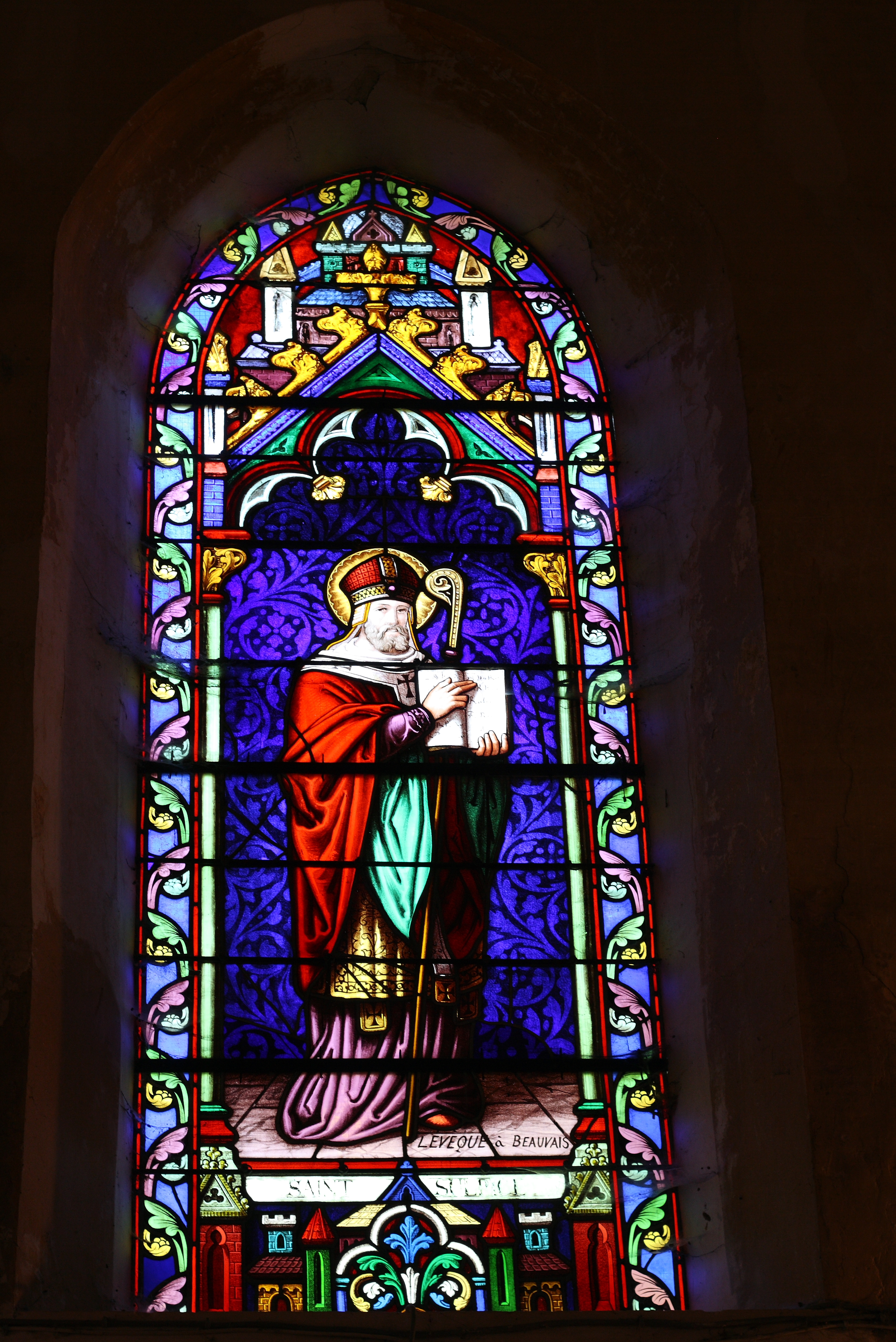
St. Sulpice window at La Celle-sur-Morin

Sulpitius I (died 591) was Bishop of Bourges. Often called Sulpitius Severus, the Severe, he is wrongly identified with Sulpicius Severus, the historian of Saint Martin of Tours.

He was raised to the see in 584. He was, says Gregory of Tours, a man of high birth, one of the first senators of Gaul, of great oratorical talent, and expert in the art of poetical rhythms. The See of Bourges having become vacant with the death of Remedius, several candidates offered gifts to King Gontran to secure the assistance of his favour. But the latter rejected all these simoniacal gifts to favour the election of Sulpitius.

He was elected, given holy orders, and consecrated bishop. Shortly afterwards, he held a council in Auvergne, to adjust the dispute which had arisen between two of his suffragans, Innocentius, Bishop of Rodez, and Urcis, Bishop of Cahors, with regard to parishes for which they contended. The council decided that the Bishop of Cahors should retain the contested parishes, which the Bishop of Rodez had not proved that he or his predecessors had long possessed. Sulpitius assisted at the Third Council of Mâcon in 585.

He is a Catholic saint, his feast occurring in the Roman Martyrology on 29 January.
