= Cahors Cathedral =

Roman Catholic church in Occitanie, France

Coordinates: 44°26′50″N 01°26′35″E

Cahors Cathedral Cathédrale Saint-Étienne de Cahors
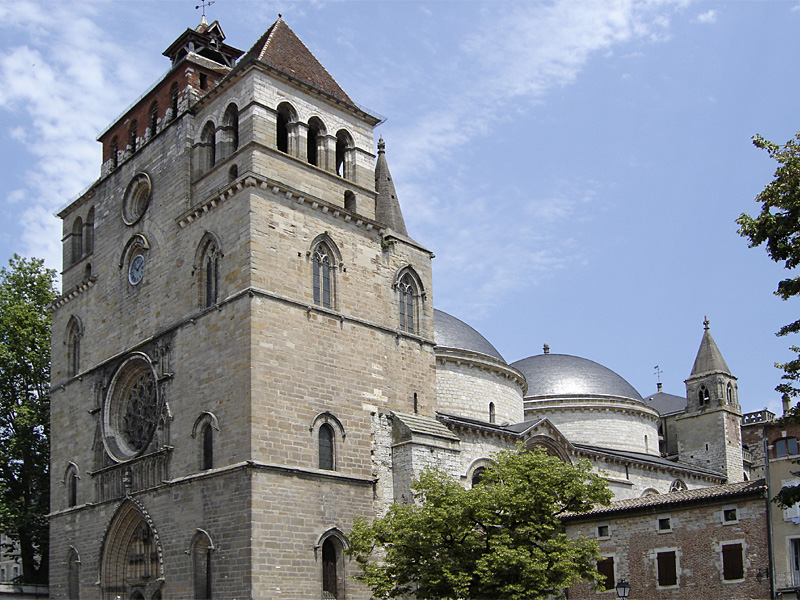
- Cahors Cathedral

Religion
- Affiliation: Roman Catholic Church
- Province: Diocese of Cahors
- Region: Occitanie
- Rite: Roman
- Ecclesiastical or organisational status: Cathedral
- Year consecrated: 1135
- Status: Active

Location
- Location: Cahors, France
- Interactive map of Cahors Cathedral; Cathédrale Saint-Étienne de Cahors

Architecture
- Type: church
- Style: Gothic, Romanesque
- Groundbreaking: 1080
- Completed: 1135

Plan of the cathedral complex

Cahors Cathedral (French: Cathédrale Saint-Étienne de Cahors) is a Roman Catholic church located in the town of Cahors, Occitanie, France. A national monument, it is an example of the transition between the late Romanesque and Gothic architectural traditions.

== Overview ==
The church was built by bishop Gerard de Cardaillac in the 11th century, over a church erected in the 7th century by St. Didier of Cahors. It was consecrated by Pope Calixtus II on September 10, 1119, and completed around 1135. The church, located in the city's centre, has the sturdy appearance of a fortified edifice: at the time, the local bishops were in fact also powerful feudal lords in their role as counts and barons of Cahors.

The façade was renovated in 1316–1324 by Guillaume de Labroue, cousin of Pope John XXII, confirms this impression: it resembles a heavy castle wall, consisting in a porch surmounted by a bell tower enclosed between two towers. The six windows, as well as those on the porch sides, are rather narrow; the only elements characterizing it as a church are the magnificent portal with triple splays, surmounted by a gallery of small arches, and the large rose window.

On the northern side is a secondary façade in Romanesque style, also fortified.

== Nave ==
The well-illuminated nave is 44 x 20 m wide. The two massive, 32 m-high, domes in Byzantines style, resting on pendentives, are supported by six huge pilasters. Unusually, there is no transept.

One of the domes is decorated with 14th-century frescoes, depicting the stoning of St. Stephen as well as eight prophets, each riding an animal, in the fashion of Greek or Hindu deities. The walls have numerous other medieval paintings.

== Apse ==
In Gothic style on a Romanesque base (to which belong the columns with decorated capitals), the apse has three chapels with sculptures. The complex forms a pleasant contrast between the white apse and the colorful stained glass and the paintings of the choir.

There are several tombs, such as that of Alain de Solminihac, and the precious relic of the Holy Cap, which supposedly was worn by Christ and which was brought to France by bishop Gerard de Cardillac after his trip to the Holy Land in 1113.

== Cloister ==
A door on the right of the choir gives access to the Flamboyant Gothic-style cloister, built in 1504 by bishop Anthony of Luzech. It has scenes of everyday life and a Madonna.

On the western side is the St. Gaubert Chapel, with the vault decorated with Italian Renaissance paintings and, on the walls, 15th-century frescoes representing the Last Judgement. It is now home to a museum of Religious Art.

== Gallery ==
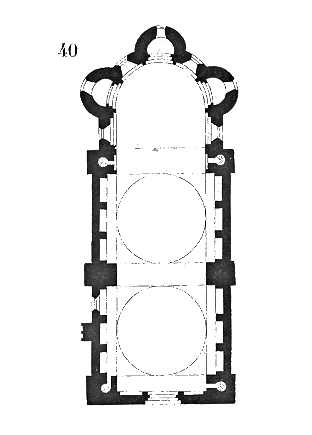
Plan of the cathedral

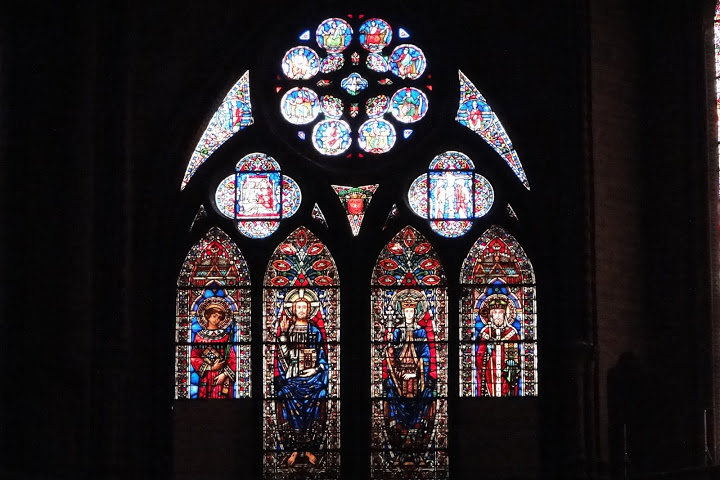
Stained glass windows

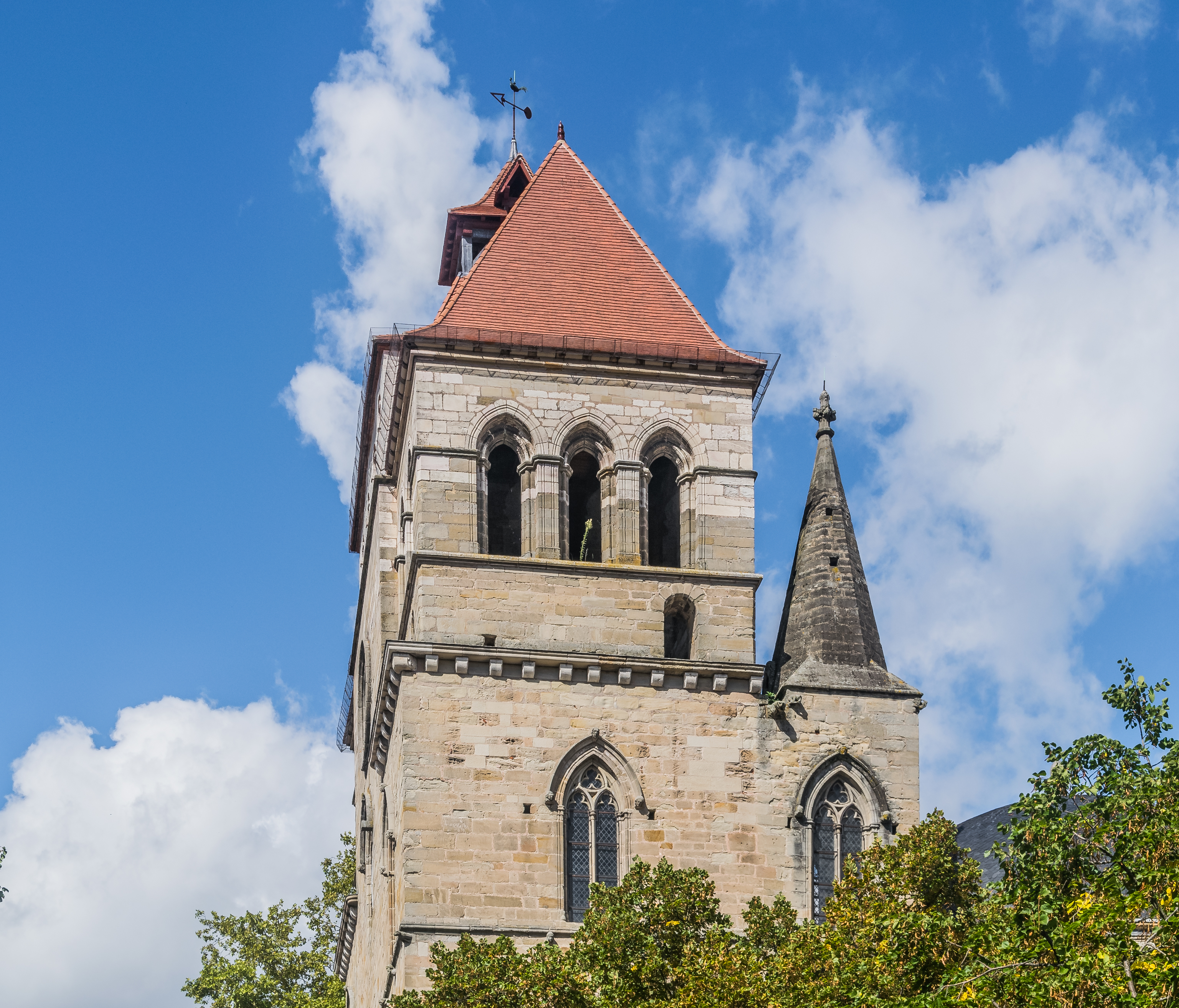
View

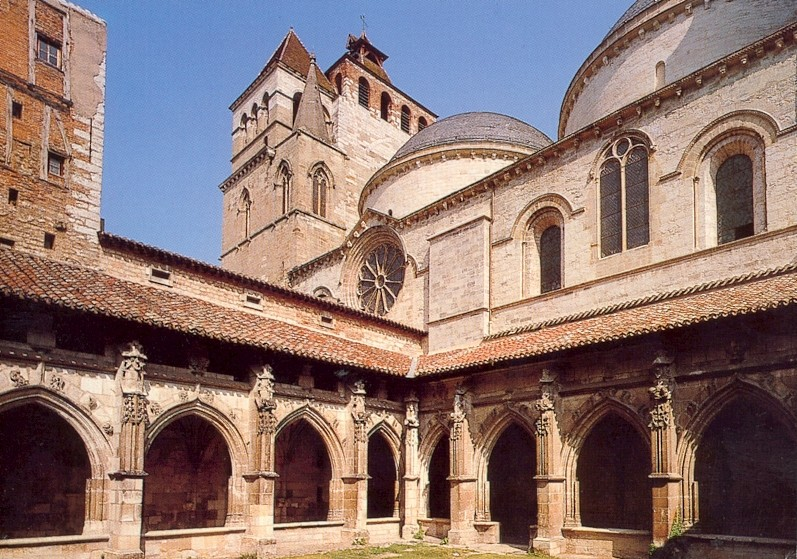
Cloister

== See also ==
- List of Gothic Cathedrals in Europe
- High medieval domes
