= Gaillard de Preyssac =

French Roman Catholic bishop

Gaillard de Préchac or de Preyssac was a French Roman Catholic cleric.

His mother Vidal/Vitale/Gailharde de Got was the sister of pope Clement V and of Arnaud-Garcie de Gout. Gaillard's father was Arnaud-Bernard I de Préchac (Préchac and Preyssac à Daignac; soudan de la Trau). Gaillard's uncle made him bishop of Toulouse in 1305, but in 1317 he was dismissed for wasting the diocese's revenues and complicity in Hugues Géraud's plot against pope John XXII.

== See also ==
- Gaillard de la Mothe, whose mother was de Preyssac's cousin
