= Blaise Gisbert =

Blaise Gisbert (21 February 1657 – 21 February 1731) was a French Jesuit rhetorician and critic.

Gisbert was born in Cahors. Having entered the Society of Jesus in 1672, he taught the humanities, rhetoric, and philosophy, after which he devoted himself for a long time to preaching. The pleasure which Gisbert took in discussing pulpit eloquence with Nicolas de Lamoignon, the intendant of Languedoc, impelled him to write an essay on sacred eloquence, which he entitled Le bon gôut de l'éloquence chrétienne (Lyons, 1702). He spent ten years in retouching this essay, and augmented it considerably by adding to the rules examples drawn from Holy Scripture and the Church Fathers, especially St. John Chrysostom. The second edition appeared in Lyons in 1715 under the title L'Eloquence chrétienne dans l'idée et dans la pratique. The work, which comprises twenty-three chapters, does not follow the rigorous order of a didactical treatise and is without the dryness of a scholastic manual. It has been called "un livre éloquent sur l'éloquence" (An eloquent book on Eloquence). It contains a series of talks on the faults to be avoided in the matter and form of sermons, on oratorical action and decorum.

Gisbert's book sufficed to make its author famous, not only among Catholic clergy, but even among Protestant pastors. One of them, Jacques L'enfant (1661–1728), carefully annotated it, and another, Kornrumpff, translated it into German. An Italian translation also appeared during Gisbert's lifetime, and later a Latin translation. As a sort of supplement, Gisbert wrote reflections on the collections of sermons printed in France from 1570 to about 1670. In this he considers ten orators before Jacques-Bénigne Bossuet and Louis Bourdaloue. The manuscript of this Historie critique de la chaire française depuis François Ier was lost but was finally recovered by Mgr Puyol and published by Fathers Chérot and Griselle, S.J., in the Revue Bourdaloue, 1902–04.

Gisbert died, aged 74, in Montpellier.
