= Didier of Cahors =

Merovingian official

Saint Didier, Bishop of Cahors
- Born: c. 580; Albi or Obreges
- Died: 15 November 655
- Venerated in: Roman Catholicism; Eastern Orthodoxy
- Feast: 15 November

Saint Didier, also known as Desiderius (c. 580 AD – November 15, 655), was a Merovingian-era royal official of aristocratic Gallo-Roman extraction.

He succeeded his own brother, Rusticus of Cahors, as bishop of Cahors after the latter's murder. Didier was ordained by Sulpitius the Pious, bishop of Bourges, on April 8, 630, and governed the diocese, which flourished under his care, until his death in 655.

Didier's career, like that of his brothers, is an example of a church and a monastic system controlled by the ruling, landholding class that was closely linked to the Merovingian monarchy. "This was no innovation of this period, but rather represented a continuation of a state of affairs which had existed since late Roman and early Merovingian times".

== Life ==
Born in the town of Albi about the year 580, to a father with the expressly Christian name of Salvius and a literate mother with the Frankish name Herchenfreda, Desiderius had two brothers, named Rusticus and Syagrius. The three boys were sent to the court of the Frankish king Clotaire II (584–629; from 613 sole sovereign), and with other boys of noble family received an excellent education at the Merovingian court-school. Rusticus assumed holy orders at an early age and became archdeacon in the town of Rodez before being appointed abbot of the palatine basilica of Clotaire, who at length appointed him bishop of Cahors, in Quercy. The second brother, Syagrius, after long service in the palace household of the Franks and long familiarity with Clotaire, was made comte d’Albi and exercised juridical authority as praefectus in the city of Marseille.

Desiderius combined a love of letters with a native Gallican eloquence, according to his Vita. While still adolescent he received the dignities of the royal household and turned his studies towards Roman (i.e. canon) law, with the result that a Roman gravity of demeanor tempered the gallic richness and brilliance of his discourse. Before long he was appointed treasurer to the king, an office that he retained under the new king, Dagobert I (629–639), whose confidant he was. After the death of Syagrius (629), he is said to have obtained also the prefectship of Marseilles, but this is not certain.

Faithful to the admonitions of his pious mother, three of whose letters to him are mentioned in his Vita, Desiderius led at court the serious holy life of a monk, and administered his office with great fidelity. While at court he made the acquaintance of St. Arnoux, St Ouen, and St Eloi.

In 630 his brother Rusticus, the Bishop of Cahors, was killed during a riot, whereupon the clergy and people of that city requested from the king Desiderius as his successor. By a letter of April 8, 630, Dagobert made known his consent, and Desiderius was consecrated Bishop of Cahors. With the other bishops of his time, many of them educated with him at the royal court, he maintained an active correspondence. He was a zealous promoter of monastic life and founded a monastery in the vicinity of Cahors, the church of which was dedicated to St. Amantius; later on the convent was called after its founder St Géry (i.e. Dierius, from Desiderius). He directed also a convent of women, as we see from a letter written by him to the Abbess Aspasia. Under him and with his support was likewise founded in his diocese the monastery of St. Peter of Moissac. Desiderius built three large basilicas in and near Cahors (St Maria, St Peter and St Julian) and an oratory in honor of St Martin. The finished style of his building was notable, not of vernacular materials of wood, wattle and thatch, but

in the manner of the ancients out of squared and hewn stones, not indeed in our Gallican fashion, but just as a whole circuit of ancient walls is wont to be built; thus from the foundations to the topmost pinnacle he completed the work with squared stones' (quoted in Greenhalgh) He also built an aqueduct to serve Cahors, and rebuilt the walls and towers (castella) that protected the city, as well as the Castrum Mercurio in Cahors itself. His actions show how much the bishop acted for the public good with the authority of a count or of a patricius. Desiderius persuaded the nobles of his diocese to endow churches and monasteries.

By his testament (649–650) he endowed the cathedral, the churches, and the monasteries of his episcopal city with all his estates. While resident on his estates in the district of Albi he fell ill and died at his villa of Wistrilingo. His body was carried to Cahors and interred in the church of St Amantius.

A Vita of Desiderius has been composed around the late 8th century by an anonymous author, possibly a monk from Saint-Géry near Cahors, written on the basis of older documents. Appended to it is a collection of letters, some composed by himself and others addressed to him, as well as an account of miracles that took place at his tomb.

His feast is celebrated on 15 November.

== "Last of the Ancient Romans" ==
Anthyme Saint-Paul, in his Histoire monumentale de la France, nominated Didier as "le dernier des Romains" ("the last of the Romans") because of his building activities as bishop. Didier's lifelong correspondence with other aristocrats that he befriended in his youth also represents the very end of ancient epistolography dating back to the Hellenistic period. Didier was fully educated in literary studies, grammar and Roman laws. His small literary circle clearly attempted to preserve Roman heritage and traditions going back to Vergil and Homer, and the ability to speak the language of the past was valued. But Didier and his circle were remarkably few in number, indicating that only a very few individuals were participating in 7th century literary society. His letter collection marks the end of an unbroken chain of not only literary style but also cultural and social connection that can be traced back to Cicero and before. Subsequent surviving letter collections from the late Merovingian and Carolingian periods lack a direct connection to any ancient models.

== Sources ==
- Desiderii episcopi Cadurcensis epistolae, ed. W. Arndt, Epistolae Merowingici et Karolini aevi 1, MGH EE 3, Berlin 1892, pp. 191–214 (Latin edition).
- La vie de Saint Didier, évêque de Cahors (630–655), ed. R. Poupardin, Paris 1900 (Latin edition with a French introduction).
- Epistulae Sancti Desiderii, ed. D. Norberg, Acta Universitatis Stockholmiensis, Studia Latina Stockholmiensia 4, Uppsala 1961 (Latin edition).

== Literature ==
- J.R.C. Martyn: King Sisebut and the culture of Visigothic Spain, with translations of the lives of Saint Desiderius of Vienne and Saint Masona of Mérida, Lewiston 2008.
