= Antoine Cavalleri =

Jesuit professor of mathematics at Cahors during much of the French Enlightenment

Antoine Cavalleri (1698–1765) was a Jesuit professor of mathematics at Cahors during much of the French Enlightenment in the 18th century, until late in the reign of Louis XV.

== Intellectual climate of the age ==
During the early years of the 18th century Isaac Newton's work on gravity was still incompletely accepted in France and Descartes' vortex theory had not yet been conclusively superseded. One result was the difficulty of formulating and establishing a coherent and compelling explanatory theory of tidal action. The French Académie Royale des Sciences both supported practical research into tidal effects, and offered a prize for the best essay to establish the topic on a sound mathematical and theoretical footing.

Three essays were selected for prizes, all of them by supporters of Newtonian theory. They were Daniel Bernoulli, Leonhard Euler, and Colin Maclaurin. However, it was rumoured by Pierre Louis Maupertuis that the reason that Cavalleri was added to the list of winners was that one influential judge among those selecting the winning essays was René Antoine Ferchault de Réaumur, who favoured Decartes' vortex theory, and who insisted that at least one winner should be a supporter of that view, though by that time it was rapidly losing ground and leading workers in the field already were rejecting it. As a sop for Réaumur, his colleagues consented to include an arbitrary choice of essay supporting the vorticist view. Cavalleri not only was fairly prominent in his own right, but had recently won two prizes from the Académie de Bordeaux for his essays: "Opacité et diaphanéité des corps" in 1738 and "Chaleur et froideur des eaux minérales" in 1739, so he was a convenient choice.

== Cavalleri's obscurity ==
Though competent, Cavalleri is little remembered. He was perhaps doubly unfortunate; firstly, in an age that produced figures such as the Bernoulli family, Euler, Lacaille, D'Alembert, Reaumur, and Lagrange, even a prominent professor of mathematics is easy to overlook. Secondly, Cavalleri's essay on tides, though penetrating in that he recognised debatable points in both Cartesian and Newtonian theory, amounted to the last substantial support for the Cartesian theory of vortices; in effect a futile rearguard action. It is true that Fontenelle has been referred to as the last defender of the vortices, but unlike Cavalleri he wrote as an interpreter and populariser, rather than as an analyst or formulator of material theory.

On the one hand Cavalleri's objection to Descartes' theory was mainly that it effectively dismissed the obvious tidal influence of the sun. On the other he rejected Newton's theory of remote gravitational attraction. The latter idea might seem naive, but even in 21st century theoretical physics there are echoes of dissatisfaction with the concept of action at a distance. He tried to construct a theoretical basis for an inverse square law of gravitational attraction arising from Cartesian vortices. Newton however, had already raised theoretical objections to Descartes' vortex theory, and Cavalleri not only failed to refute the objections, but misinterpreted a modified vortex theory by Philippe Villemot which attempted to reconcile vortices with Newtonian attraction.

Cavalleri's essay, although having received the prize from the Académie, more or less lapsed into obscurity thereafter. Possibly this was because of its being biased towards Cartesian rather than Newtonian gravitational theory; Pope Benedict XIV had ordered two priests to produce a new, annotated edition of Newton's Principia. In the commentary the other three winning essays were included, but Cavalleri's was omitted.

== Works ==
- Opacité et diaphanéité des corps, winning essay for Académie de Bordeaux, 1738
- Chaleur et froideur des eaux minérales, winning essay for Académie de Bordeaux, 1739
- Pièces qui ont remporté le prix de l'Académie royale des sciences, en MDCCXL. sur le flux et reflux de la mer winning essay for Académie Royale des Sciences, 1740
