= Maurice Gaidon =

French Roman Catholic bishop

His Excellency Maurice Gaidon
- Bishop of Cahors
- Church: Roman Catholic Church
- See: Diocese of Cahors
- Predecessor: Joseph-Marie-Henri Rabine
- Successor: Norbert José Henri Turini

Orders
- Ordination: 29 June 1956
- Consecration: 30 September 1973 by André Charles de la Brousse

Personal details
- Born: 17 January 1928 Dijon, France
- Died: 14 November 2011 (aged 83) Dijon, France
- Motto: Ex toto corde meo
- Coat of arms

Maurice-Adolphe Gaidon (17 January 1928 – 14 November 2011) was the Roman Catholic bishop of the Roman Catholic Diocese of Cahors, France.

Ordained to the priesthood in 1956, Gaidon became a bishop in 1973 retiring in 2004.
