= Pont Valentré =

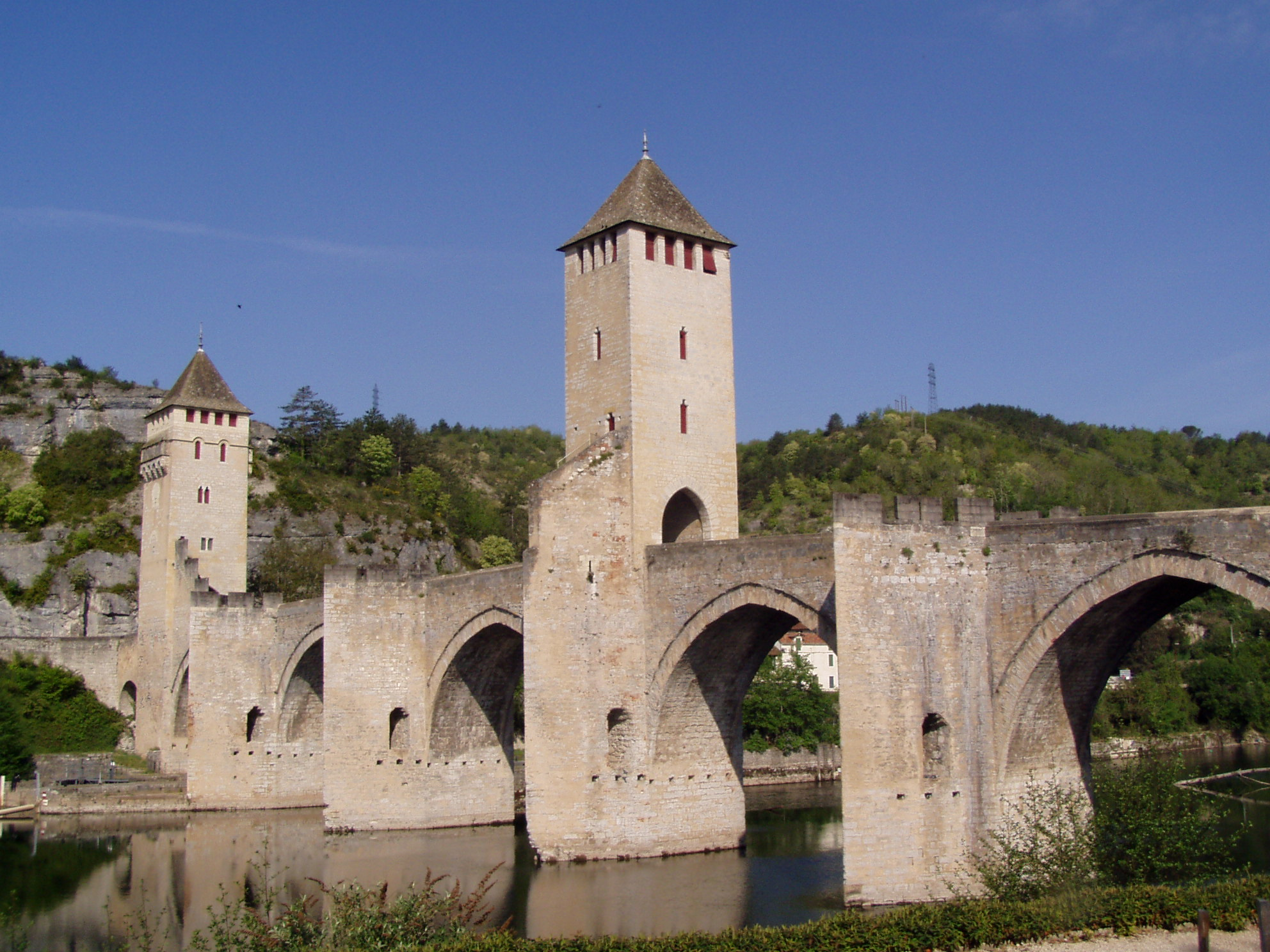
- Coordinates: 44°26′42″N 1°25′54″E
- Crosses: Lot
- Locale: Cahors, France

Characteristics
- Design: arch bridge
- Material: Stone
- Total length: 138 metres (453 ft)
- Width: 5 metres (16 ft)
- Height: 40 metres (130 ft) (towers)
- Longest span: 6 × 16.5 metres (54 ft)
- No. of spans: 6

History
- Construction start: 17 June 1308
- Construction end: 1378
- Opened: 1350; 676 years ago

Location
- Interactive map of Pont Valentré

The Pont Valentré (French pronunciation: [pɔ̃ valɑ̃tʁe]) (Occitan: Pont de Balandras; English: Valentré Bridge) is a 14th-century six-span fortified stone arch bridge crossing the river Lot to the west of Cahors, in France. It has become a symbol of the city.

After the decision was made to build it on 30 April 1306, construction began on 17 June 1308. It was built between 1308 and 1378 with six Gothic arches and three square bridge towers. It opened for use in 1350. It was originally fortified at both ends; the western tower has not survived.

The bridge was built due to increasing tensions in the region between France and England that would eventually erupt into the Hundred Years' War around 30 years later.

A major restoration was performed from 1867 to 1879 by Paul Gout.

The bridge was classified in 1998 as a World Heritage Site.

This bridge can only be crossed by foot.

== The legend of the Pont Valentré ==
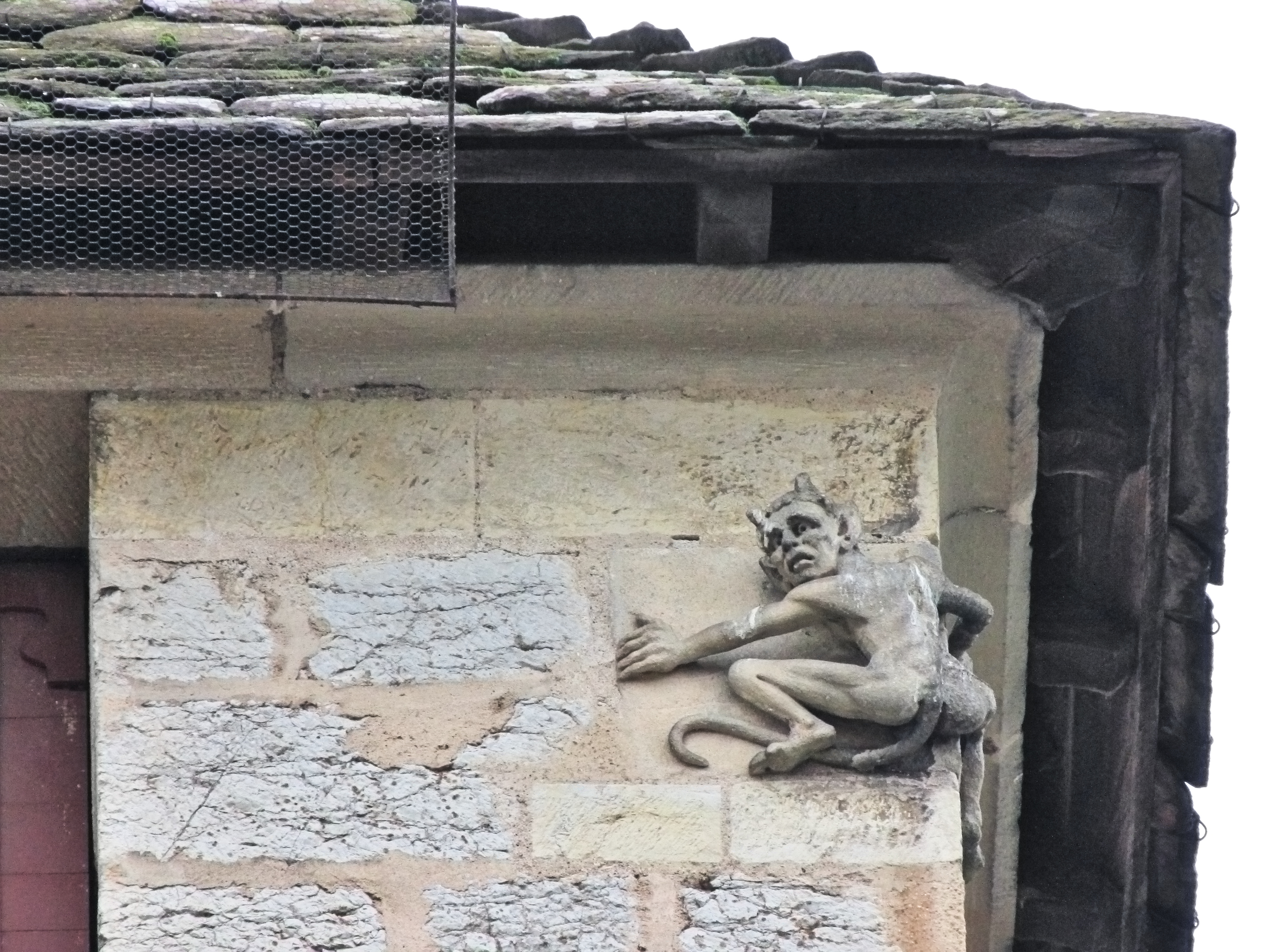
Statue of a devilish imp, added during the 1879 restoration.

The construction of the bridge lasted 70 years (1308 to 1378). In local folklore it is said that the foreman, exasperated by the slow pace of the work, signed a pact with the Devil. In the pact the Devil promised to use his skills to expedite the work and, if he carried out all of the foreman's orders, then his (the foreman's) soul would be forfeit.

Having seen the bridge built on time, the foreman regrets his decision and issues a final order to the devil to go and collect water for the other workers using a sieve. In revenge for having been tricked, the Devil sends a demon each night to loosen the final stone in the central tower (known as the Devil's Tower) to ensure that the bridge is never finished and must be repaired each day.

During the restoration of the bridge in 1879, the architect Paul Gout inserted a stone bearing the sculpted image of an imp into the central tower. As a result, according to the updated legend, every time the Devil checks to see that his vandalism has been carried out, he is confused into thinking that the stone image is one of his demons tasked with dismantling the bridge.

== See also ==
- List of medieval bridges in France
- List of bridges in France
