= Hugues Géraud =

French bishop

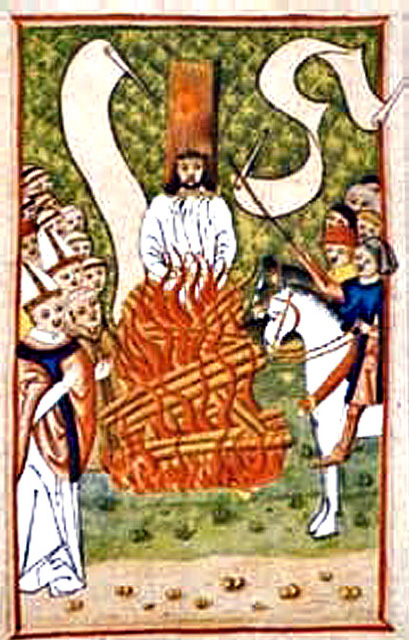
Hugues Géraud

Hugues Géraud (died 30 August 1317) was a 14th-century Roman Catholic bishop, serving as bishop of Cahors from 1313 until his dismissal in 1317 for attempting to murder pope John XXII by poison and witchcraft, for which he was burned at the stake.

== Life ==
During his time as bishop he was tried for embezzlement and – thinking he had lost his case – he decided to poison the pope. He enlisted Pons de Vassal and Isar d’Escodata, both members of the papal court, and procured poisons and wax figurines to bewitch the pope. He first tested the bewitchment against the pope's nephew Jacques de Via.

Three wax figurines, representing Pope John XIII and his advisors Bertrand du Pouget and Gaucelme de Jean, were hidden in loaves and given to messengers to carry into the episcopal palace. However, the messengers' strange behaviour drew the attention of the papal guards, who discovered the figurines. On 23 March 1317 Géraud and everyone else implicated in the plot were arrested. Influential figures from south-west France gravitated towards Géraud's entourage, including Gaillard de Preyssac (bishop of Toulouse and nephew of pope Clement V), Arnaud de Pellegrue (cardinal and rival to John XXII at his election as pope) and the viscount of Bruniquel (Clement V's nephew by marriage).

Questioning began on 22 April at the château de Noves and on 5 May the pope commissioned Pierre des Prés and Arnaud de Capdenac to continue the enquiry. The suspects were questioned in secret, meaning the names of major figures implicated in the plot were not revealed. The plot quickly unravelled, with Géraud admitting everything without being tortured and the pope praising des Près's "prudence, faithfulness and experience". During the questioning Jacques de Via died. On 21 August the pope personally questioned Géraud, who nine days later was found guilty of witchcraft, sacrilege and the murder of Jacques de Via. He was dismissed from his bishopric, handed over to the secular arm and burned at the stake in front of the episcopal palace in Avignon. de Preyssac also lost his diocese, but de Pellegrue went unpunished.

1317 also saw the pope issue a papal bull expanding inquisitors' rights when investigating witchcraft and sorcery, followed by another in August 1326 entitled Super illius specula which made sorcery practically equivalent to heresy. This campaign against sorcery was continued by John's successors from pope Benedict XII to Antipope Alexander V. At the pope's request Pierre des Prés also presided over the trials of Géraud's accomplices, most notably those of Pierre de Saleilles in September 1322 and of Bernard Gasc (a bishop in partibus who had blessed the wax figurines) on 26 November 1322
