= Jacques de Via =

French Cardinal

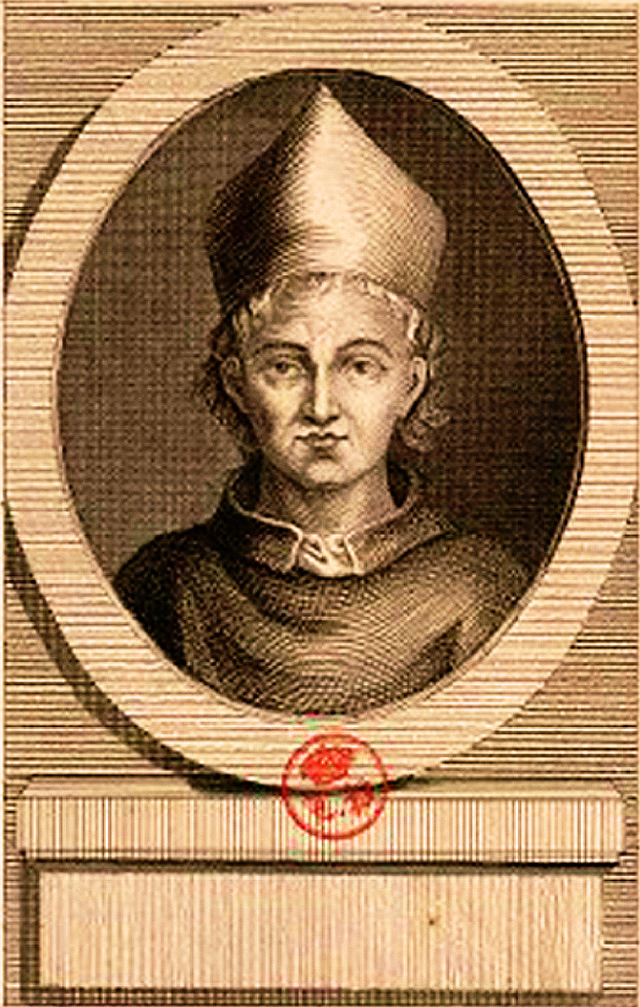
Later print of Jacques de Via

Jacques de Via (died 13 June 1317) was a French cardinal in the Roman Catholic Church. His brother Arnaud was also a cardinal.

== Life ==
Born in Cahors (year unknown), he first became chantry canon of Fréjus. He was already occupying this position on 2 January 1304. Then, he became archdeacon of Mede and prebendary canon of Mende. In 1313 he was elected bishop of Avignon, succeeding his mother's brother Jacques Duèze, the future Pope John XXII, who made him a cardinal in the consistory of 17 December 1316.

He died in June 1317 during the trial of Hugues Géraud, bishop of Cahors for attempting to murder pope John XXII by witchcraft. Géraud was thus also accused of initially testing his witchcraft on Jacques de Via and his murder was added to the charge sheet. Géraud was found guilty, stripped of his bishopric and burned at the stake.
