= Alain de Solminihac =

French Catholic religious reformer

Blessed Bishop Alain de Solminihac
- Bishop of Cahors
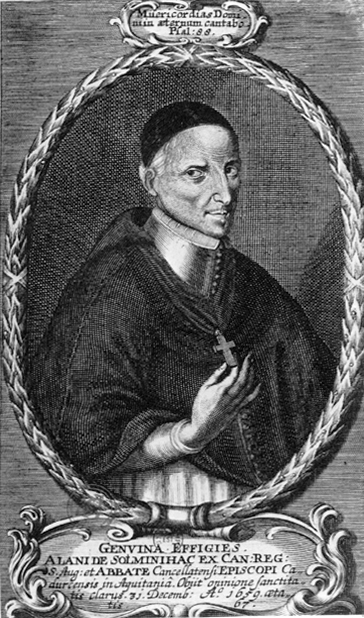
- Church: Roman Catholic Church
- Diocese: Cahors
- See: Cahors
- Appointed: 22 September 1636
- Term ended: 31 December 1659
- Predecessor: Pierre Habert de Montmort
- Successor: Nicolas Sévin

Orders
- Ordination: 22 September 1618
- Consecration: 27 September 1637 by Charles de Montchal
- Rank: Bishop

Personal details
- Born: Alain de Solminihac; 25 November 1593 Chateau de Belet, Dordogne, Kingdom of France
- Died: 31 December 1659 (aged 66) Mercuès, Lot, Kingdom of France
- Motto: Fides virtusque ("Faith and valor")

Sainthood
- Feast day: 31 December; 3 January (Augustinians)
- Venerated in: Roman Catholic Church
- Beatified: 4 October 1981; Saint Peter's Square, Vatican City by Pope John Paul II
- Attributes: Bishop's attire; Crucifix
- Patronage: Diocese of Cahors

Alain de Solminihac (25 November 1593 – 31 December 1659) was a French Roman Catholic religious reformer and served as the Bishop of Cahors from 1636 until his death.

Solminihac was a professed member of the Canons Regular of Saint Augustine of Chancelade in Périgueux, an order now extinct. He was also a member of the Compagnie du Saint-Sacrement, and acquainted with Vincent de Paul and Francis de Sales.

He was declared a Servant of God after Pope Pius VI opened his cause for sainthood on 6 August 1783 and Pope Pius XI declared him to be Venerable on 19 June 1927. Pope John Paul II beatified him on 4 October 1981.

== Life ==
Alain de Solminihac was born on 25 November 1593 in the Chateau de Belet Kingdom of France to Jean and Margaret de Solminihac.

He wanted to become a member of the Knights of Malta in order to serve God but felt a strong call to the priesthood and to the religious life so joined the Canons Regular of Saint Augustine of Chancelade in 1613 as a postulant. His period of novitiate commenced in 1615 and concluded on 28 July 1618. The completion of his theological studies soon saw him ordained to the priesthood on 22 September 1618. He was made the superior of his convent in 1623. Pope Urban VIII appointed him as the Bishop of Cahors on 22 September 1636 (King Louis XIII approved this after meeting him) and he received his episcopal consecration on 27 September 1637 in the French capital of Paris.

The bishop visited each of his 800 parishes at least nine times during the course of his episcopate and he held an episcopal consecration on one occasion. He also prompted adoration to the Eucharist and restored a range of local devotions. He followed the lead of Charles Borromeo in enforcing the decrees of the Council of Trent in his diocese. He met Francis de Sales for the first time during Lent in 1619 and the two had more meetings following this; he also became a friend of Vincent de Paul.

He died on 31 December 1659.

== Beatification ==
A cause for his beatification was opened on 6 August 1783 under Pope Pius VI, and he was declared Venerable by Pope Pius XI on 20 May 1927. The process for a miracle attributed to his intercession saw two independent processes run with the informative one spanning from 1769 until 1775. The Congregation for Rites validated the informative miracle process on 12 April 1905 while the Congregation for the Causes of Saints validated the apostolic one on 14 April 1978.

The medical board approved the miracle on 25 June 1975 while the C.C.S. officials and their consultants also approved it on 10 April 1979; the C.C.S. themselves issued their own approval to it on 29 May 1979 and passed it to Pope John Paul II who granted the final approval needed on 13 July 1979 in which the pope also confirmed the beatification. John Paul II beatified him on 4 October 1981.

The miracle involved the cure of Marie Ledoux on 29 June 1661 in France.

== Bibliography ==
- P. Petot, Alain de Solminihac (1593–1659), prélat réformateur. De l'abbaye de Chancelade à l'évêché de Cahors, Turnhout: Brepols Publishers, 2009, ISBN 978-2-503-53278-3
