= Gauscelin de Jean =

French cardinal

Gauscelin de Jean (died 3 August 1348) was a French cardinal.

He was born at Cahors in the family related (by the marriage alliance) to the family of Pope John XXII. From 1312 he was archdeacon of Paris. Pope John XXII shortly after his election to the papacy named him Vice-Chancellor of the Holy Roman Church (occupied the post until 1319), and in his first consistory on 17 December 1316 created him cardinal-priest of SS. Marcellino e Pietro. In 1317 together with Cardinal Luca Fieschi unsuccessfully tried to mediate (as papal legate) between Scotland and England. In Scotland the legates were even detained for some time due to their alleged partiality in favour of England. In 1319 Gauscelin was more successful by arranging a truce between France and Flanders.

In 1327 John XXII named him Bishop of Albano and grand penitentiary. He participated in the papal conclaves in 1334 and 1342. He held several benefices in England and France. He took part also in the process for the controversy in the Order of the Friars Minor (Franciscans) concerning the poverty of Christ and the Apostles.

He died at Avignon.

== See also ==
- Cahorsins
- Cardinals created by John XXII

== Bibliography ==
- Konrad Eubel: Hierarchia Catholica Medii Aevi, Vol. I, 1913
- G. Mollat: Vitae paparum avenionensium, vol. II, Paris 1928
