= Arnaud de Via =

French Cardinal

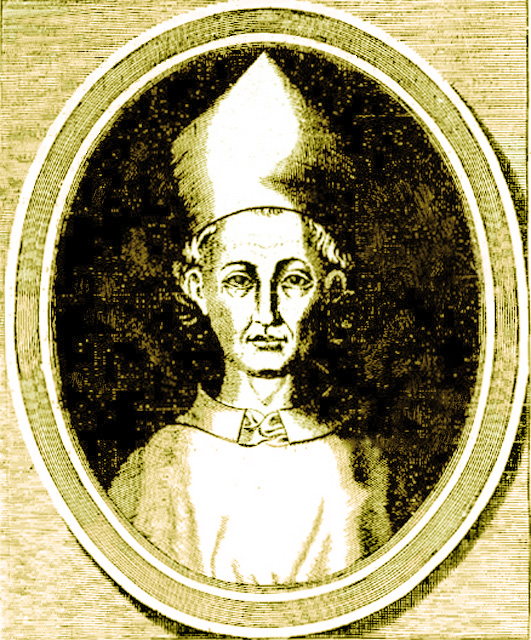
Arnaud

Arnaud de Via (died 24 November 1335) was a French cardinal in the Roman Catholic Church. Arnaud's brother Jacques was also a cardinal and their mother was sister to pope John XXII.

== Life ==
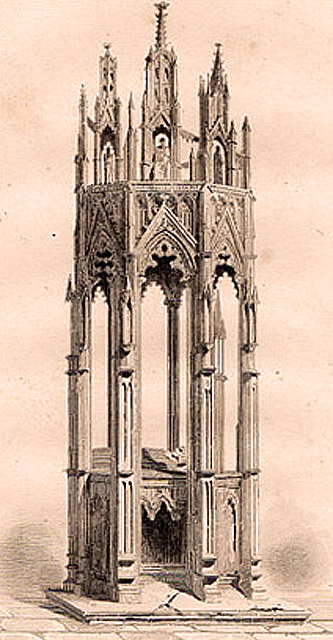
His tomb in Villeneuve-lès-Avignon.

Born in Cahors, he became a protonotary apostolic, archdeacon of Fréjus, provost of Barjols and prior of S. Nicola de Bari. He was made a cardinal in the consistory of 20 June 1317. He built the Petit Palais in Avignon, a residence at Villeneuve-lès-Avignon and the collégiale Notre-Dame, intended to receive his tomb and granted a chapter of 12 canons. He took part in the papal conclave of 1334, which elected pope Benedict XII and died in Avignon.
