= Cahors =

Cahors Caors (Occitan)
- Prefecture and commune
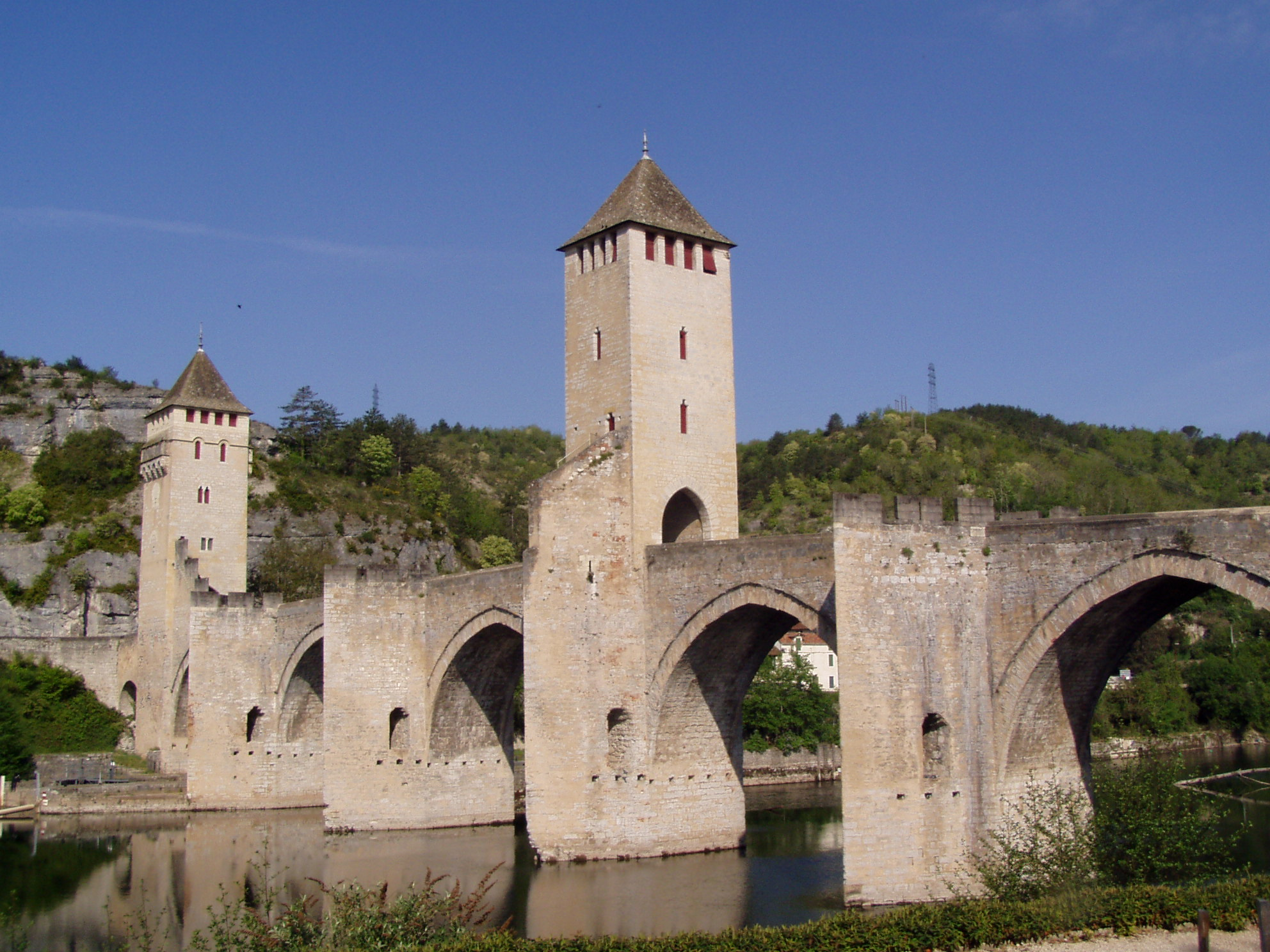
- Valentré bridge

- Flag Coat of arms
- Location of Cahors
- Location within France Location within Occitanie
- Coordinates: 44°26′54″N 1°26′29″E
- Country: France
- Region: Occitania
- Department: Lot
- Arrondissement: Cahors
- Canton: Cahors-1, 2 and 3
- Intercommunality: CA Grand Cahors

Government
  - Mayor (2026–32): Vivien Coste
- Area^{1}: 64.72 km^{2} (24.99 sq mi)
- Elevation: 130 m (430 ft)
- Population (2023): 20,050
  - Density: 309.8/km^{2} (802.4/sq mi)
- Time zone: UTC+01:00 (CET)
  - Summer (DST): UTC+02:00 (CEST)
- INSEE/Postal code: 46042 /46000
- ^{1} French Land Register data, which excludes lakes, ponds, glaciers > 1 km^{2} (0.386 sq mi or 247 acres) and river estuaries.

Cahors (French pronunciation: [kaɔʁ]; Languedocien: Caors [kaˈuɾs, ˈkɔw(s)]) is a commune in the western part of Southern France. It is the smallest prefecture among the 13 departments that constitute the Occitanie Region. The capital and main city of the Lot department and the historical center of the Quercy, Cahors is home to 20,050 cadurciennes and cadurciens (2023).

Nestled in a meander of the Lot and surrounded by steep arid limestone hills, this historic city is home to great monumental diversity, mainly inherited from Roman times and the Middle Ages; the city's monuments include a historic city centre, Saint-Étienne cathedral, Roman walls and the famous Valentré bridge (a UNESCO World Heritage Site as part of the pilgrimage path to Santiago de Compostela). Famed for its wine and gastronomy (truffles and foie gras), this southern French city holds the label of the French Towns of Art and History. The Cadurcian economy is reliant on tertiary services and makes Cahors the Lot's economic centre.

== History ==
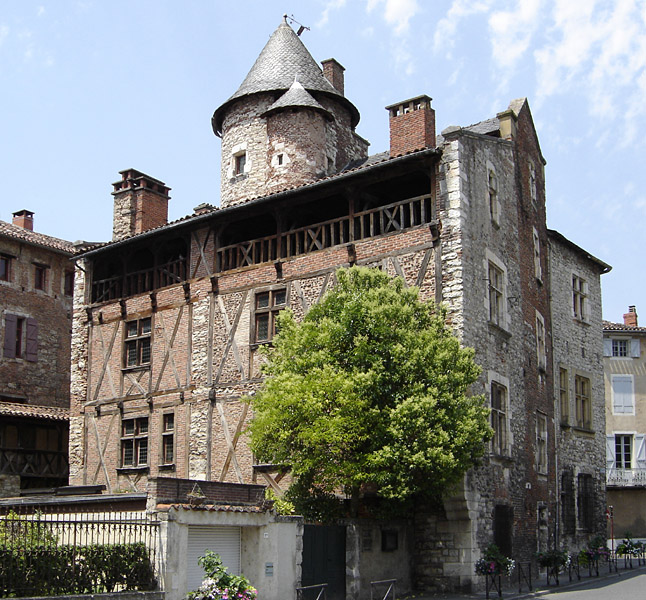
The Hôtel de Roaldès

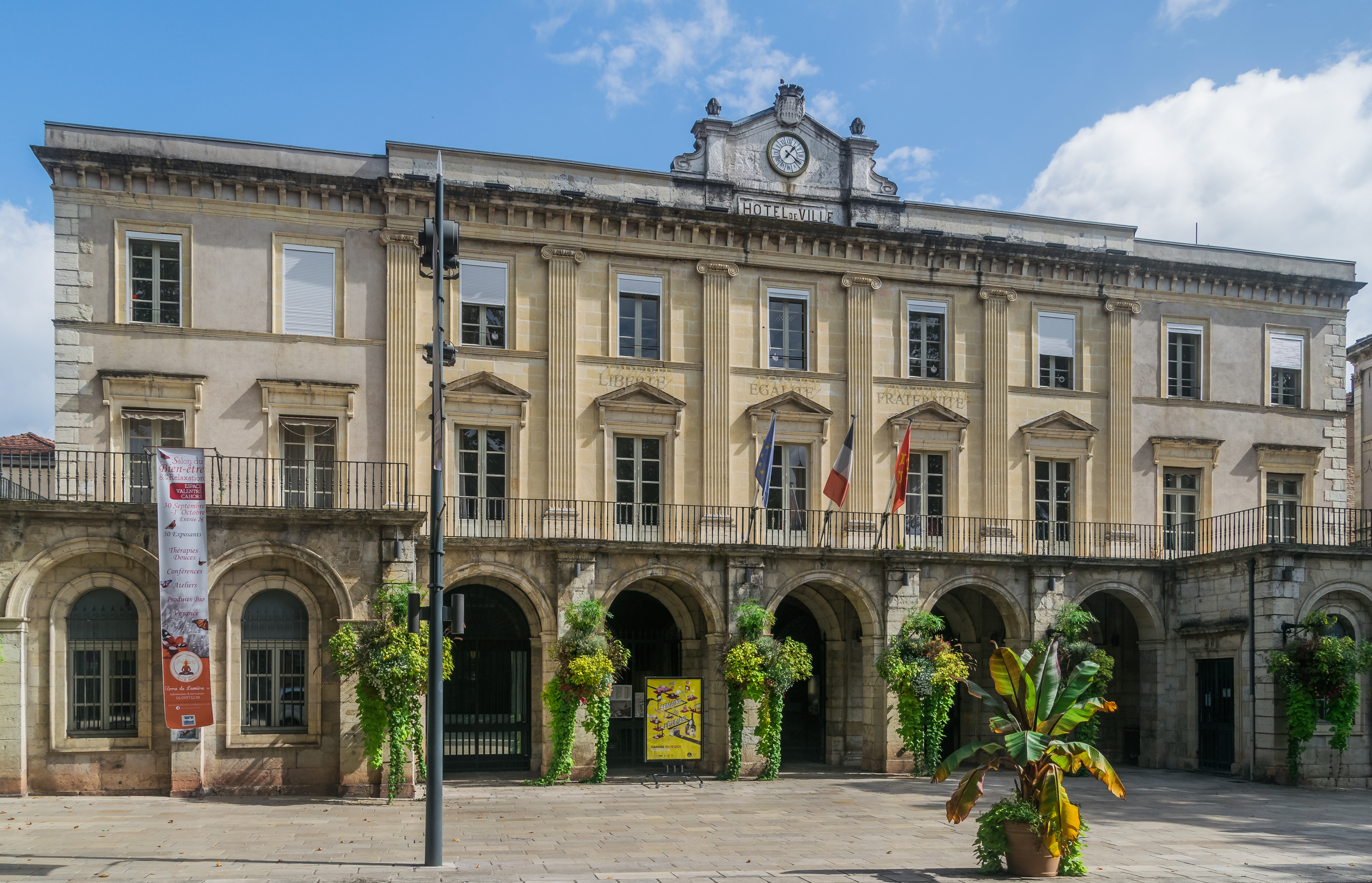
The Hôtel de Ville

Cahors has had a rich history since Celtic times. The original name of the town was Divona or Divona Cadurcorum, "Divona of the Cadurci," Divona was a fountain, now called "la fontaine des Chartreux", worshiped by the Cadurci, a Celtic people of Gaul before the Roman conquest in the 50s BC. The Cadurci were among the last Celtic tribes to resist the Roman invasion. Cahors derives from Cadurcorum. However, romanization was rapid and profound: Cahors became a large Roman city, with many monuments whose remnants can be seen today. It has declined economically since the Middle Ages, and lost its university in the 18th century. Today it is a popular tourist centre with people coming to enjoy its medieval quarter and the 14th-century fortified Valentré bridge. It is the seat of the Diocese of Cahors.

It was also notorious at that time for the financiers widely known as Cahorsins, Christians who charged interest on their loans. The church in these times said that using money as an end in itself (usury) was a sin. Because of this Cahors became synonymous with this sin, and was mentioned in Dante's Inferno (XI.50) alongside Sodom as wicked.

Pope John XXII, born Jacques Duèze or d'Euse, was born in Cahors in 1244, the son of a shoemaker.

The Hôtel de Ville was completed in 1840.

In the 2007 Tour de France, Cahors was the start of stage 18. Cahors also in the 2022 Tour de France was the finish of stage 19.

== Geography ==
The town is situated 115 km (71 mi) north of Toulouse, on the RN20 / A20, connecting the city, via Limoges to Paris and Orléans. The town's altitude is between 105 and 332 m (344 and 1,089 ft). With an area of 64.72 km^{2} (24.99 sq mi), and a population density, relatively high for France of 309 inhabitants per square kilometre (800/sq mi).

== Population ==
Historical population
Year	Pop.	±% p.a.
1968	19,128	—
1975	20,226	+0.80%
1982	19,707	−0.37%
1990	19,735	+0.02%
1999	20,003	+0.15%
2007	20,093	+0.06%
2012	19,991	−0.10%
2017	19,878	−0.11%
2023	20,050	+0.14%
Source: INSEE

== Main sites ==
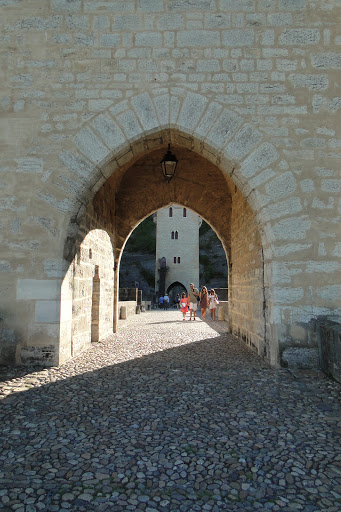
On the bridge

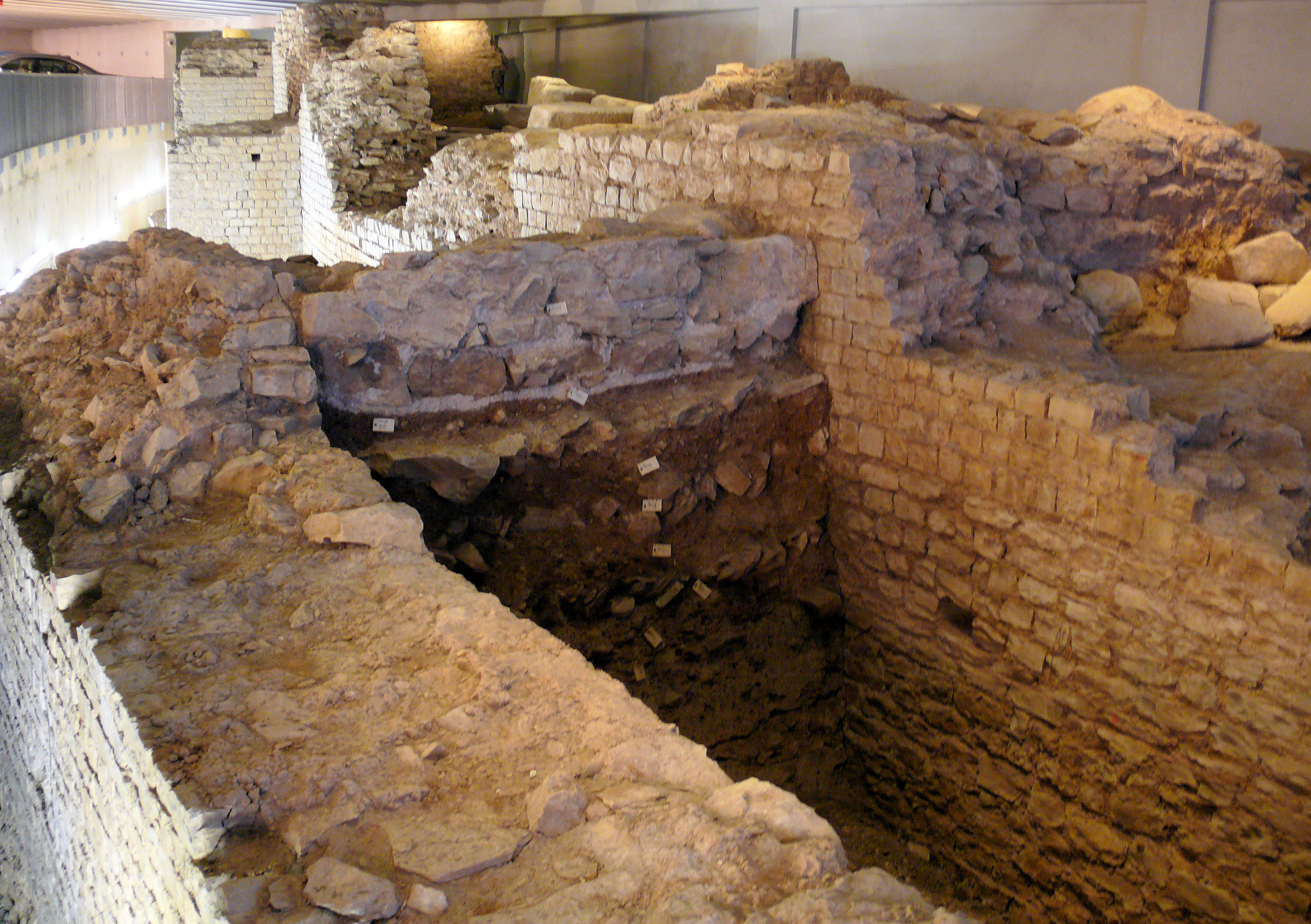
Cahors - Roman amphitheatre

- The Valentré Bridge, the symbol of the town. Building began in 1308 and was completed in 1378. The legend associated with this bridge is one of the most fully realized of all Devil's Bridge legends, with a carefully developed plot, complex characters, and a surprising dénouement. When the bridge was restored in 1879, the architect Paul Gout made reference to this by placing a small sculpture of the devil at the summit of one of the towers.
- Cathédrale Saint-Étienne, a national monument.
- Saint-Barthélémy Church (14th century).
- Maison Henri IV or Hôtel de Roaldès (15th century).
- Daurade quarter with:
  - Maison Hérétié (14th–16th centuries)
  - Maison Dolive (17th century)
  - Maison du Bourreau (13th century)
- The barbican that once defended the Barre Gate.
- Tour des pendus.
- Palais Duèze.
- Tower of Pope John XXII.
- Collège Pélegry.
- Cloister
- Arc de Diane, a relic of ancient Roman baths.
- Roman Amphitheatre – remains of an oval amphitheatre were revealed when the underground car park was excavated at the Place Gambetta, just west of, and partially beneath, Boulevard Gambetta in the city centre. The stone walls can be seen in the car park first level, below the statue of Leon Gambetta, opened to the public in April 2009.

== Wine ==
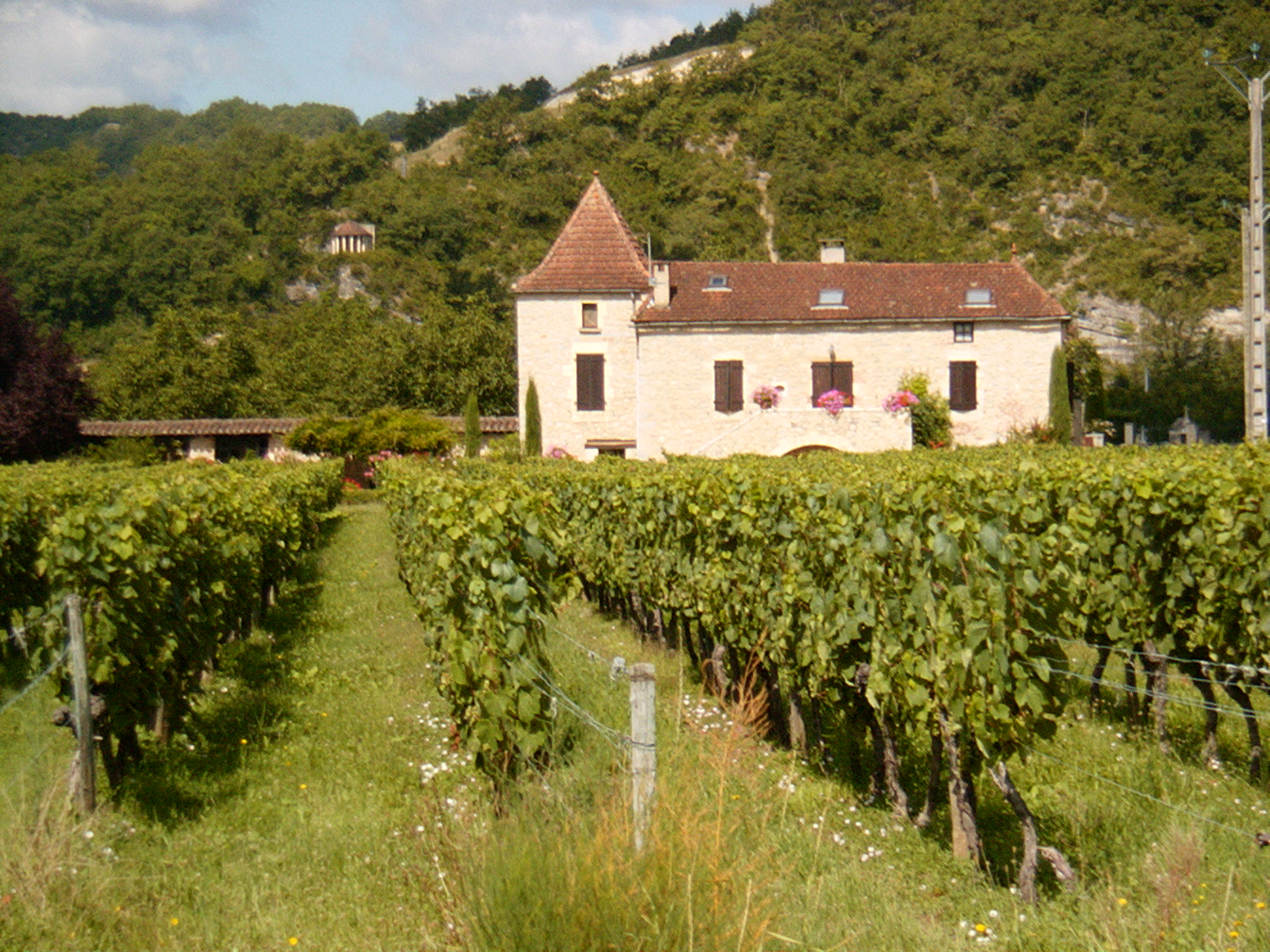
A Cahors château and vineyard

The area around Cahors produces wine, primarily robust and tannic red wine. Wine from the Cahors appellation must be made from at least 70% Malbec (also called Cot, Auxerrois and Pressac) grape, with a maximum of 30% Merlot or Tannat grape varieties.

== Culture ==
The Cahors Blues Festival has taken place annually, in July, since 1982.

== Education ==
From 1331 to 1751 the Roman Catholic Diocese of Cahors managed the University of Cahors.

Pope John XXII granted a charter on 7 June 1331.

The university had three colleges at Cahors: Pélegry (1358), Rodez (1371), and San Michel (1473). Fénelon studied at this institution, which, in 1751, was dissolved as a separate institution and annexed to the University of Toulouse. The institution had faculties covering theology, law, medicine, arts and literature.

The university dissolved in 1751 and faculties annexed into the University of Toulouse.

== Notable people ==
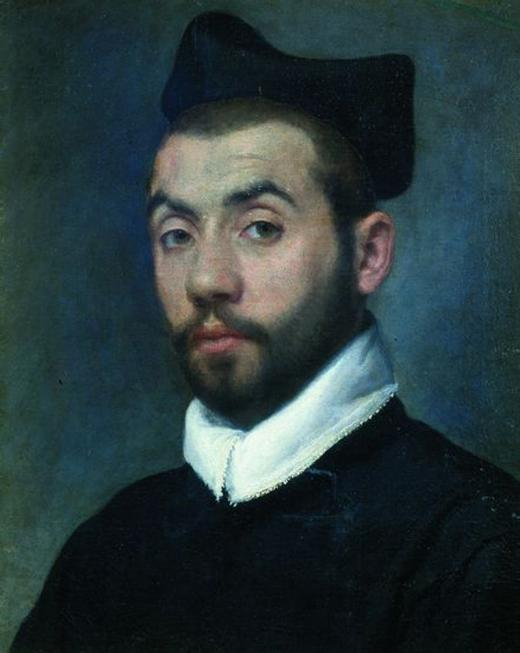
Clement Marot

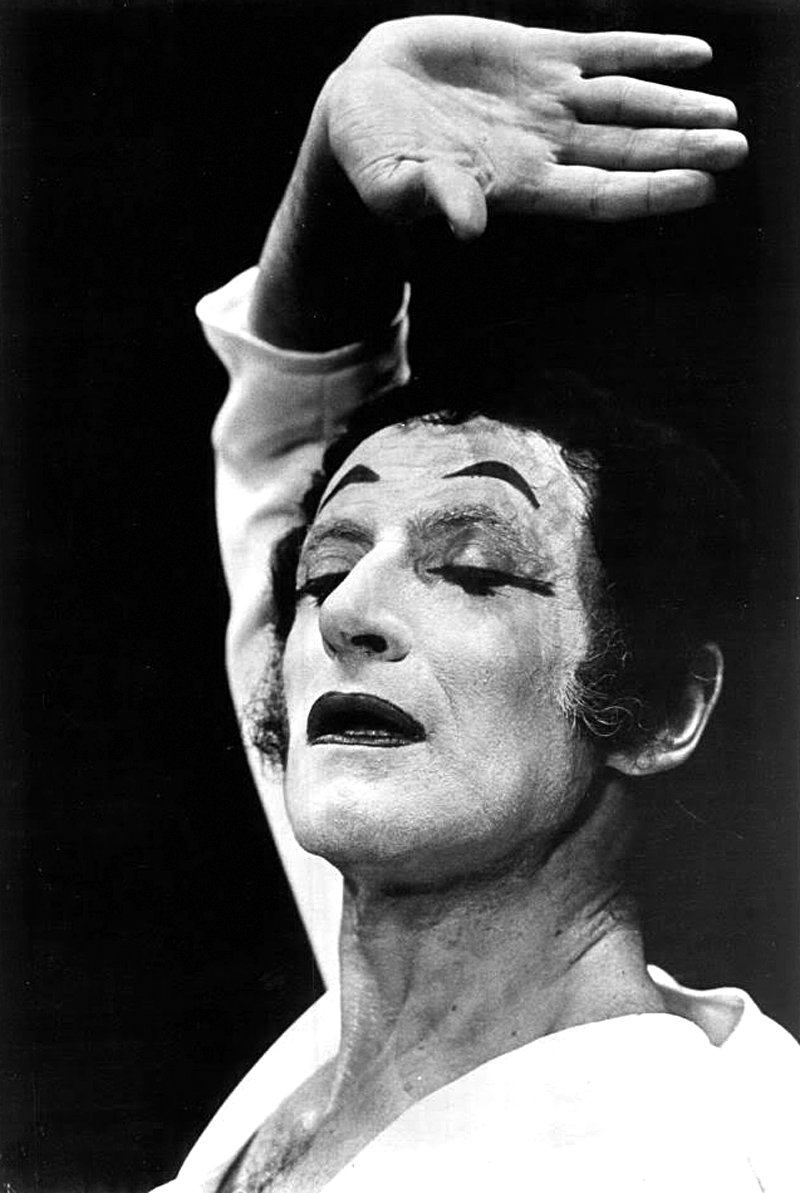
Marcel Marceau, 1971

- Gerald of Braga (died 1109), Benedictine monk and Bishop of Braga
- Jacques de Via (died 1317) & Arnaud de Via (died 1335), Roman Catholic cardinals
- Pope John XXII (1244 – 1334), Pope from 1316 to 1334, born Jacques Duèze.
- Clément Marot (1496–1544), a Renaissance poet.
- Blaise Gisbert (1657–1731), a Jesuit rhetorician and critic.
- Jean Pierre de Caussade (1675–1751), Jesuit priest and writer.
- Antoine Cavalleri (1698–1765), Jesuit professor of maths during the Age of Enlightenment
- Jean-Baptiste Bessières (1768 in Prayssac – 1813), 1st Duke of Istria, military commander and Marshal of the Empire.
- Charles Combes (1801–1872), engineer, his name is on the Eiffel Tower
- Léon Gambetta (1838–1882), lawyer, politician and statesman; proclaimed the French Third Republic in 1870.
- François Deloncle (1856–1922), an orientalist, journalist, diplomat and politician.
- Jules Combarieu (1859–1916), musicologist and music critic.
- Marie-Louise Dissard OBE GM (1881–1957), member of the French Resistance during WWII.
- Louis Darquier de Pellepoix (1897–1980), Commissioner-General for Jewish Affairs under the Vichy Régime
- Georges Gorse (1915–2002), politician and diplomat.
- Marcel Marceau (1923–2007), actor and mime artist, died in Cahors rest home.
- Émile Parisien (born 1982), a soprano and alto saxophonist, jazz musician and composer.

=== Sport ===
- Philippe Benetton (born 1968), former rugby union footballer, now head coach
- Fabien Galthié (born 1969), rugby union player now head coach of the France national team.
- Oussama Souaidy (born 1981), a retired footballer who also played for Morocco.

== Climate ==
Climate data for Cahors (Le Montat) (1991–2020 normals, extremes 1986–present)
Month	Jan	Feb	Mar	Apr	May	Jun	Jul	Aug	Sep	Oct	Nov	Dec	Year
Record high °C (°F)	19.6 (67.3)	25.9 (78.6)	26.4 (79.5)	31.0 (87.8)	34.5 (94.1)	40.2 (104.4)	40.0 (104.0)	43.3 (109.9)	35.7 (96.3)	34.6 (94.3)	23.8 (74.8)	18.3 (64.9)	43.3 (109.9)
Mean daily maximum °C (°F)	9.1 (48.4)	10.9 (51.6)	15.1 (59.2)	18.2 (64.8)	22.0 (71.6)	25.9 (78.6)	28.7 (83.7)	28.7 (83.7)	24.4 (75.9)	19.3 (66.7)	12.9 (55.2)	9.6 (49.3)	18.7 (65.7)
Daily mean °C (°F)	5.4 (41.7)	6.2 (43.2)	9.6 (49.3)	12.3 (54.1)	15.8 (60.4)	19.5 (67.1)	21.8 (71.2)	21.8 (71.2)	17.9 (64.2)	14.1 (57.4)	8.8 (47.8)	6.0 (42.8)	13.3 (55.9)
Mean daily minimum °C (°F)	1.7 (35.1)	1.5 (34.7)	4.2 (39.6)	6.5 (43.7)	9.6 (49.3)	13.1 (55.6)	15.0 (59.0)	14.9 (58.8)	11.5 (52.7)	9.0 (48.2)	4.8 (40.6)	2.3 (36.1)	7.8 (46.0)
Record low °C (°F)	−20.0 (−4.0)	−12.5 (9.5)	−11.6 (11.1)	−3.2 (26.2)	0.4 (32.7)	4.0 (39.2)	7.2 (45.0)	5.1 (41.2)	2.0 (35.6)	−5.8 (21.6)	−8.7 (16.3)	−11.4 (11.5)	−20.0 (−4.0)
Average precipitation mm (inches)	76.9 (3.03)	60.2 (2.37)	60.5 (2.38)	73.4 (2.89)	80.4 (3.17)	78.1 (3.07)	49.6 (1.95)	60.9 (2.40)	69.1 (2.72)	65.1 (2.56)	73.5 (2.89)	76.9 (3.03)	824.6 (32.46)
Average precipitation days (≥ 1.0 mm)	11.8	10.0	10.2	10.4	10.1	8.0	6.6	7.2	8.0	9.1	10.9	11.7	114.1
Mean monthly sunshine hours	84.1	128.2	168.8	193.3	220.7	250.6	272.0	253.0	221.0	152.8	103.0	94.3	2,141.9
Source: Meteociel

== See also ==
- Communes of the Lot department
