= Maurilio =

Maurilio or Maurelio (Italian), Maurille (French) and Maurílio (Portuguese) are variations of the Latin name Maurilius.

Maurilius

- Maurilius of Angers (died 426), bishop and saint
- Maurilius (died 1067), bishop of Rouen

Maurilio

- Maurilio Fossati (1876–1965), Italian cardinal
- Maurilio De Zolt (born 1950), Italian cross country skier
- Maurilio Mariani (born 1973), Italian pole vaulter

Maurílio

- Hélder Maurílio da Silva Ferreira (born 1988), Brazilian footballer
- Maurílio (born 1969), Brazilian football manager
