= Diocese of Cahors =

Catholic diocese in France

Coordinates: 44°26′50″N 1°26′34″E

Diocese of Cahors Dioecesis Cadurcensis Diocèse de Cahors

Catholic
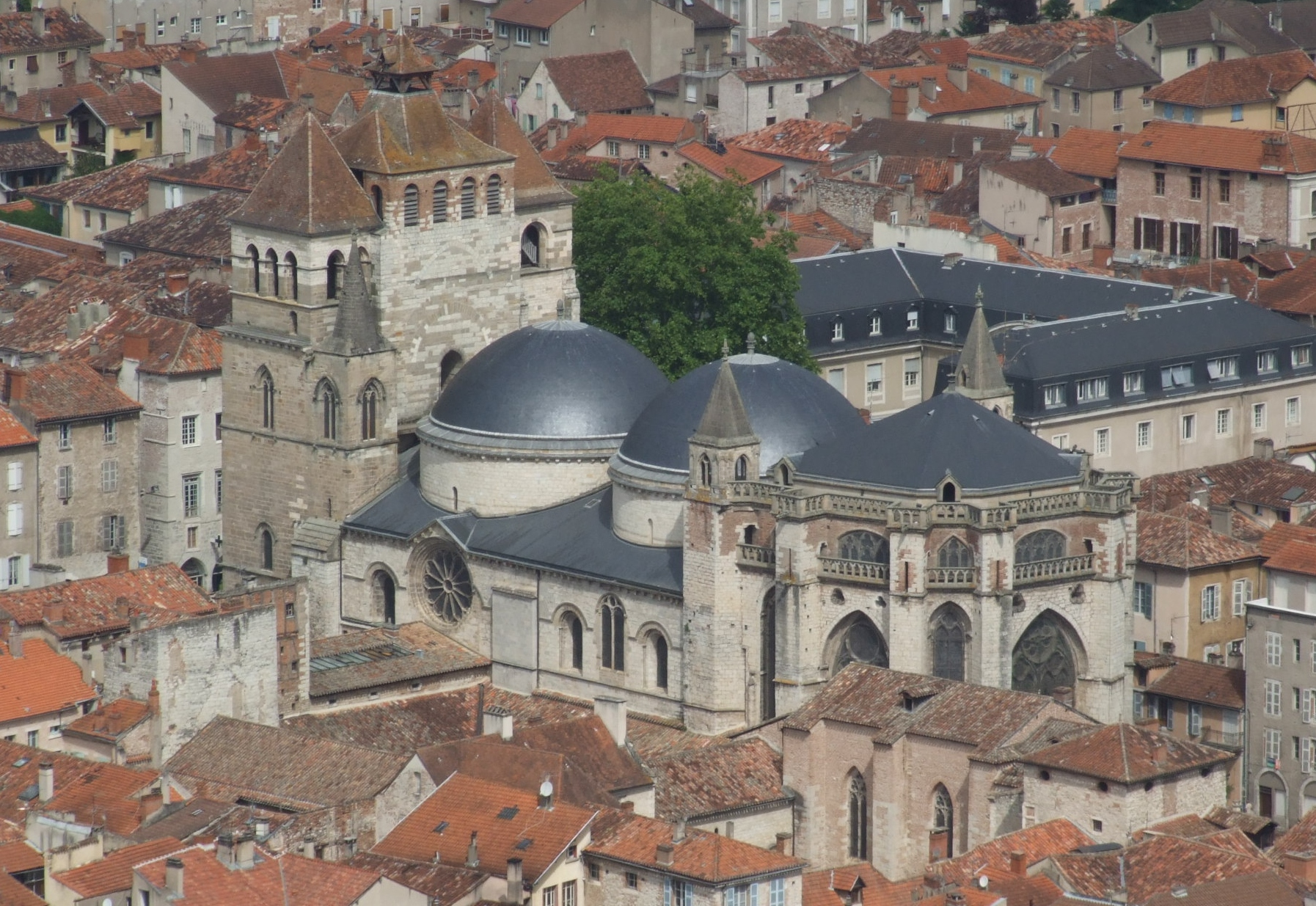
- Cahors Cathedral

Location
- Country: France
- Ecclesiastical province: Toulouse
- Metropolitan: Archdiocese of Toulouse

Statistics
- Area: 5,216 km^{2} (2,014 sq mi)
- Population: Total; Catholics: (as of 2023); 174,670 (est.); 163,540 (est.) (93.6%)
- Parishes: 392

Information
- Denomination: Roman Catholic
- Sui iuris church: Latin Church
- Rite: Roman Rite
- Established: 3rd Century
- Cathedral: Cathedral of St. Stephen in Cahors
- Patron saint: Saint Stephen
- Secular priests: 45 (Diocesan); 3 (Religious Orders); 7 Permanent Deacons

Current leadership
- Pope: Leo XIV
- Bishop: Laurent Camiade
- Metropolitan Archbishop: Guy de Kerimel

Map

Website
- Website of the Diocese

The Diocese of Cahors (Latin: Dioecesis Cadurcensis; French: Diocèse de Cahors) is a Latin Church diocese of the Catholic Church in France. The diocese comprises the whole of the department of Lot.

In the beginning it was a suffragan of the Archdiocese of Bourges, and later, from 1676 to the time of the French Revolution, it was a suffragan of the Archdiocese of Albi. From 1802 to 1822 Cahors was under the Archbishop of Toulouse, and combined the former Diocese of Rodez with a great part of the former Diocese of Vabres and the Diocese of Montauban. However, in 1822 it was restored almost to its pristine limits and again made suffragan to Albi.

In the Diocese of Cahors in 2023 there was one priest for every 3,407 Catholics.

== History ==
According to a tradition connected with the legend of St. Martial, this saint, deputed by St. Peter, came to Cahors in the first century and there dedicated a church to St. Stephen, while his disciple, St. Amadour (Amator), the Zaccheus of the Gospel and husband of St. Veronica, evangelized the diocese. In the seventeenth century these traditions were closely examined by the Abbé Antoine Raymond de Fouillac, a friend of Fénelon, and, according to him, the bones discovered at Rocamadour in 1166, and looked upon as the relics of Zaccheus, were in reality the bones of St. Amator, Bishop of Auxerre.

A legend written about the year 1000 by the monks of Saint-Genou Abbey (in the Diocese of Bourges) relates that Genitus and his son Genulfus were sent to Gaul by Pope Sixtus II (257–59), and that Genulfus (Genou) was the first Bishop of Cahors. But Louis Duchesne repudiated this as legend.

The first historically known Bishop of Cahors is St. Florentius, correspondent of Paulinus of Nola (ca. 354–431). The Diocese of Cahors counted among its bishops Hugues Géraud (1312–16), who was implicated in the conspiracy against John XXII and sentenced to be burned alive; and Alain de Solminihac (1636–59), a reformer of the clergy.

=== Diocesan organization ===
The Cathedral of Saint-Étienne de Cahors was served by a Chapter composed of fourteen individuals. The Bishop was considered a member of the Chapter, as were the Archdeacons of Cahors and Tournus; in addition there was a Precentor and a Treasurer, as well as nine other Canons. In addition there were four hebdomadarii, fourteen prebendaries, and twelve chaplains. In 1251, Bishop Bartholomaeus secularized the Chapter, and in 1253 issued new Statutes for them.

The diocese was divided into districts, each headed by an Archpriest. It is attested that by 1526 there were fourteen Archpriests, though a number of them are far older, being mentioned already in the 12th century. Six archpriests are named in the 13th century. The archpriests were supervised by the Archdeacons, of which there were six by 1252: Montpezat, Tournès, Figeac, Cahors, Saint-Céré, and Vaux. In 1418, however, Bishop Guillaume (VI.) d'Arpajon decided to suppress superfluous offices and reduced the number of archdeacons to two: Cahors and Tournès; these two continued to exist down to the Revolution.

=== City of Cahors ===
Location of Cahors

The city of Cahors was visited by Pope Callistus II (1119–24) in 1119, where, on 26 August 1119 he dedicated the high altar of the cathedral. It was also the birthplace of Jacques d'Euse (1244–1334), who became pope in 1316 under the title of John XXII. The tower of his palace is still to be seen in Cahors. He provided a charter for a university there, dated 7 June 1331, its law faculty being so celebrated as to boast at times of 1200 pupils. There were three colleges at Cahors: Pélegry (1358), Rodez (1371), and San Michel (1473). Fénelon studied at this institution, which, in 1751, was dissolved as a separate institution and annexed to the University of Toulouse. In the sixteenth century the Diocese of Cahors was severely tried by religious wars, and the Collège de Pélegry, which provided for a certain number of university students without cost, became noted for the way in which these young men defended Cahors against the Huguenots. The War of the Spanish Succession in its turn took a heavy toll on the good order of the university. In 1707 King Louis XIV found it necessary to reform the Collège de Pélegry and provide it with new statutes.

In 1680 the town of Cahors is reckoned as having some 12,000 inhabitants. By 1766 the population is estimated to have grown to 15,000 persons.

The Cathedral of Saint-Étienne, built at the end of the eleventh and restored in the fourteenth century, has a beautiful Gothic cloister. Recent archival and archaeological discoveries have demonstrated, however, that the westwork of the cathedral, once thought to be of the 14th century, was actually completed by 1288. Plans were already under way by the mid-1240s, when Pope Innocent IV granted indulgences to those who contributed financially to the project; these were renewed by Pope Alexander IV in 1255, and yet another grant was made in 1289 by Nicholas III. The great builders were Bishop Bartholomeus de Roux and Bishop Raimond de Cornil. In 1285 Bishop Raimond persuaded the Chapter to join with him in a commitment to donate half of the first year of income of every newly granted benefice in the diocese to the building fund. When, in the Middle Ages, the bishops officiated in this church they had the privilege, as barons and counts of Cahors, of depositing their sword and armour on the altar. In the diocese local honors are given to St. Sacerdos, Bishop of Limoges, and his mother, Mundana (seventh century); Esperie (Speria), virgin and martyr (eighth century); St. Géraud, Count of Aurillac (beginning of the eleventh century); Blessed Christopher, companion of St. Francis of Assisi and founder of a Franciscan convent at Cahors in 1216, and Blessed Jean-Gabriel Perboyre, born in the village of Mongesty, 1802, and martyred in China, 1840.

The city of Figeac owed its origin to a Benedictine abbey founded by Pepin in 755. The principal places of pilgrimage are: Notre-Dame de Rocamadour, visited by St. Louis (1245), Charles the Fair (1324), and Louis XI (1463); Notre-Dame de Félines and Notre-Dame de Verdale, both dating back to the eleventh century; Saint-Hilaire Lalbenque, where relics of St. Benedict Joseph Labre are preserved.

=== The Revolution ===
During the French Revolution the Diocese of Cahors was abolished and its territory subsumed into a new diocese, coterminous with the new 'Departement de Lot' and a suffragan of the 'Metropole du Sud' in the departement of Haute-Garonne, with its seat at Toulouse. The clergy were required to swear and oath to the Constitution, and under the terms of the Civil Constitution of the Clergy a new bishop was to be elected by all the voters of the departement, who were not even required to be Catholics. This placed them in schism with the Roman Catholic Church and the Pope. The electors of the Diocese of Lot duly met, but found no obvious candidate in the department of Lot; they therefore chose an outsider, Abbé Jean-Louis Gouttes as their new Constitutional Bishop. He has also been chosen by the electors of Seine-et Loire, which he preferred. The electors of Lot then, on 27 February 1791, elected Jean d'Anglars, the Archpriest of Cajarc. He was consecrated at Tulle on 29 April by Jean-Jacques Brival.

The legitimate Bishop Louis Maria de Nicolai died in 1791, leaving the diocese vacant. On 11 November 1791 Pope Pius VI appointed Charles-Nicolas de Bécave to be the Vicar-Apostolic of the Diocese of Cahors in the absence of a bishop; he served until the appointment of a new bishop in 1802. Both the Constitutional Church and the Roman Catholic Church were severely stressed in 1793 and 1794 by the Terror, and the discovery that Reason was to replace Faith as the governing principle in France.

In 1801 First Consul Napoleon Bonaparte ordered all the Constitutional Bishops to resign. He was striking a Concordat with Pope Pius VII, which included the liquidation of the Constitutional Church. In accordance with the Concordat, the Pope revived the Diocese of Cahors and placed it in the hands of Guillaume-Balthasar Cousin de Grainville of Montpellier. D'Anglars was made an honorary Canon of the Cathedral of Cahors.

== Bishops ==
=== To 1000 ===
[Genulfus] c. 300
[Saint Sebast c. 300]

- Florentius c. 380
- Alithius c. 425
- [Saint Anatolius c. 450]
- Boethius c. 506
- Sustratius c. 541
- Maximus c. 549
- Maurilio 580
- Ursicinus c. 585
- Eusebius 614
- Rusticus 623–630
- Desiderius 630–655
- Beto c. 673
- Saint Capua c. 700
- Saint Ambrosius c. 745
- ? c. 770
- Agarn c. 783
- Aimat c. 813
- Angarius 813–?
- Stephanus I. 852–?
- Guillaume c. 875, 876
- Gerardus I. c. 887
- Saint Gausbert 892–907
- Amblardus c. 909
- Bernardus I. 945–?
- Frotarius I. c. 961
- Stephanus (Étienne) II. 972–?
- Frotarius II. 979–?
- Gausbert II. de Gourdon c. 990

=== 1000 to 1300 ===
- Bernardus II. de Castelnau 1005–?
- Deudonné c. 1031
- Bernardus III. de Castelnau-Gramat 1042–?
- Fulco Simonis : (attested 1055, 1061, 1063)
- Bernardus IV de Castelnau : (attested 1067)
- Gerard II : (attested 1068, 1074, 1095, 1107)
- Géraud de Cardaillac 1083–1112
- Guillaume de Calmont : 1113–1143
- Gerard IV. Hector : 1159–1199
- Guillaume III. : attested in 1199, 1202
- Bartholomaeus : c. 1207
- Guillaume de Carvaillon : 1208–1234
- Pons d'Antejac: 1235–1236
- Gérard de Barasc: 1237–1250
- Bartholomeus de Roux: 1250–1273

Sede Vacante 1273 – 1280

- Raimond (or Rainaldus) de Corneille: 1280–1293
- Sicard de Montaigu : 1294–1300

=== 1300–1500 ===
- Ramon de Pauchel : 1300–1312
- Hugues Geraldi : 1313–1317
- Guillaume V. de Labroue, O.P. : 1317–1324
- Bertrand de Cardaillac 1324–1367
- Beco (Bego) de Castelnau 1367–1388
- François de Cardaillac 1388–1404 (Avignon Obedience)
- Guillaume VI. d'Arpajon 1404–1431 (Avignon Obedience)
- Jean del Puèy 1431–1434
- Jean de Castelnau-Caylus 1438–1459
- Louis d'Albret (Cardinal) 1460–1465
- Antoine d'Alamand 1465–1474
- Guiscard d'Aubusson 1474–1476
- Antoine d'Alamand (2. Mal) 1476–1493
- Benet de Joan 1494–1501

=== 1500–1800 ===
- Antoine de Luzech : 1501–1510
- Germin de Ganay: 1510–1514
- Charles-Dominique del Caretto (Cardinal) : 1514
- Louis del Carretto: 1514–1524
- Paul del Carretto : 1524–1553
- Cardinal Alessandro Farnese 1554–1557, Administrator.
- Pierre de Bertrand: 1557–1563
- Jean de Balaguer : 1567–1576
- Antoine Hebrard de Saint-Sulpice : 1577–1600
- Siméon-Étienne de Popian: 1601–1627
- Pierre Habert : 1627–1636
- Alan de Solminihac: 1636–1659
- Nicolaus Sévin : 1660–1678
- Louis-Antoine de Noailles : 1679–1680
- Henri Guillaume Le Jay : 1680–1693
- Henri de Briqueville de la Luzerne : 1693–1741
- Bertrand Jean-Baptiste Renatus du Guesclin: 1741–1766
- Josep Dominic de Cheylus: 1766–1777
- Louis Maria de Nicolai: 1777–1791
- [Charles-Nicolas de Bécave: 1791–1802] (Vicar Apostolic)
  - [Jean d'Anglars : 1791] (Constitutional Bishop)

=== From 1800 ===
- Guillaume-Balthasar Cousin de Grainville (1802–1828)
- Paul Louis Joseph D'Hautpoul (1828–1842)
- Jean-Jacques-David Bardou (1842–1863)
- Joseph-François-Clet Peschoud (1863–1865)
- Pierre-Alfred Grimardias (1866–1896)
- Emile-Christophe Enard (1896–1906)
- Victor-Omésime-Quirin Laurans (1906–1911)
- Pierre-Célestin Cézerac (1911–1918)
- Joseph-Lucien Giray (1918–1936)
- Jean-Joseph-Aimé Moussaron (1936–1940)
- Paul Chevrier (1941–1962)
- André Bréheret(1962–1972)
- Joseph-Marie-Henri Rabine (1973–1986)
- Maurice-Adolphe Gaidon (1987–2004)
- Norbert Turini (2004–2014)
- Laurent Michel Camiade (2015–present)

== See also ==
- Catholic Church in France

== Books ==
=== Reference works ===
- Gams, Pius Bonifatius (1873). Series episcoporum Ecclesiae catholicae: quotquot innotuerunt a beato Petro apostolo. Ratisbon: Typis et Sumptibus Georgii Josephi Manz. pp. 524–526. (Use with caution; obsolete)
- Eubel, Conradus, ed. (1913). Hierarchia catholica, Tomus 1 (second ed.). Münster: Libreria Regensbergiana. (in Latin)
- Eubel, Conradus, ed. (1914). Hierarchia catholica, Tomus 2 (second ed.). Münster: Libreria Regensbergiana. (in Latin)
- Gulik, Guilelmus (1923). Eubel, Conradus (ed.). Hierarchia catholica, Tomus 3 (second ed.). Münster: Libreria Regensbergiana.
- Gauchat, Patritius (Patrice) (1935). Hierarchia catholica IV (1592-1667). Münster: Libraria Regensbergiana.
- Ritzler, Remigius; Sefrin, Pirminus (1952). Hierarchia catholica medii et recentis aevi V (1667-1730). Patavii: Messagero di S. Antonio.
- Ritzler, Remigius; Sefrin, Pirminus (1958). Hierarchia catholica medii et recentis aevi VI (1730-1799). Patavii: Messagero di S. Antonio.
- Ritzler, Remigius; Sefrin, Pirminus (1968). Hierarchia Catholica medii et recentioris aevi sive summorum pontificum, S. R. E. cardinalium, ecclesiarum antistitum series... A pontificatu Pii PP. VII (1800) usque ad pontificatum Gregorii PP. XVI (1846) (in Latin). Vol. VII. Monasterii: Libr. Regensburgiana.
- Remigius Ritzler; Pirminus Sefrin (1978). Hierarchia catholica Medii et recentioris aevi... A Pontificatu PII PP. IX (1846) usque ad Pontificatum Leonis PP. XIII (1903) (in Latin). Vol. VIII. Il Messaggero di S. Antonio.
- Pięta, Zenon (2002). Hierarchia catholica medii et recentioris aevi... A pontificatu Pii PP. X (1903) usque ad pontificatum Benedictii PP. XV (1922) (in Latin). Vol. IX. Padua: Messagero di San Antonio. ISBN 978-88-250-1000-8.
- Sainte-Marthe, Denis de (1715). Gallia Christiana, In Provincias Ecclesiasticas Distributa; Qua Series Et Historia Archiepiscoporum, Episcoporum, Et Abbatum Franciae Vicinarumque Ditionum ab origine Ecclesiarum ad nostra tempora deducitur, & probatur ex authenticis Instrumentis ad calcem appositis: Tomus Primus (in Latin). Paris: Johannes-Baptista Coignard. pp. 115–196, Instrumenta pp. 28–49.

=== Studies ===
- Baudel, M.J. (1876). Histoire de l'Université de Cahors (in French). Cahors: Layton.
- Boulade, (Abbe) (1897). Monographie de la cathédrale de Cahors suivie d'une notice sur le suaire à la tête du christ, et certains évêques de Cahors inhumés dans la cathédrale (in French). Cahors: Delsaud.
- Duchesne, Louis (1910). Fastes épiscopaux de l'ancienne Gaule: II. L'Aquitaine et les Lyonnaises. Paris: Fontemoing. pp. 44–47.
- DuFour, Jean (1989). "Les évêques d'Albi, de Cahors, et de Rodez, des origins à la fin du XIIe siècle," Memoires et documents d'histoire médiévale et de philologie 3 (Paris 1989).
- Du Tems, Hugues (1774). Le clergé de France, ou tableau historique et chronologique des archevêques, évêques, abbés, abbesses et chefs des chapitres principaux du royaume (in French). Vol. Tome premier. Paris: Brunet. pp. 215–248.
- Gasmand, Marion (2007). Les évêques de la province ecclésiastique de Bourges: milieu Xe-fin XIe siècle (in French). Paris: Connaissances et Savoirs. ISBN 978-2-7539-0022-6.
- Jean, Armand (1891). Les évêques et les archevêques de France depuis 1682 jusqu'à 1801 (in French). Paris: A. Picard. pp. 5–7.
- Lacarrière, Cyprien (1876). Histoire des évêques de Cahors, des saints, des monastères et des principaux évènements du Quercy (in French). Martel (Lot): J.-B. Valat.
- La Croix, Guillaume de (1626). Series et acte episcoporum Cadurcensium (in Latin). Cahors: J. Dalvy.
- La Croix, Guillaume de (1879). Histoire des évêques de Cahors, tr. du lat. par L. Ayma (in French). Vol. Tome premier. Cahors: Cantade.
- La Croix, Guillaume de (1879). Histoire des évêques de Cahors, tr. du lat. par L. Ayma (in French). Vol. Tome second. Cahors: Cantade.
- Longnon, Auguste (1877). Pouillé du diocèse de Cahors (in French and Latin). Paris: Imprimerie nationale.
- Savy, Nicolas (2005). Cahors pendant la guerre de Cent Ans (in French). Cahors: Colorys. ISBN 978-2-9524385-0-6.
- Scellès Maurice, Séraphin Gilles (2002). "Les dates de la « rénovation » gothique de la cathédrale de Cahors". In: Bulletin Monumental, tome 160, n°3, 2002. pp. 249–273.
- Vic, Claude de; Vaissete, J. (1872). Histoire générale de Languedoc, avec des notes et les pièces justificatives....: Livres I-X (des origines à 877) (in French). Vol. Tome premier. Toulouse: Privat.
