= Cardinals created by Urban VI =

Catholic appointments from 1378 to 1384

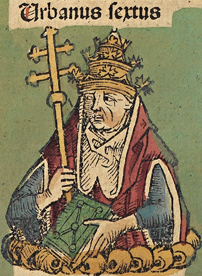
Pope Urban VI (r. 1378–1389)

Pope Urban VI (r. 1378–1389) created 42 cardinals in four consistories held throughout his pontificate. In 1381 he named his future successor Pope Boniface IX as a cardinal.

== 18 September 1378 ==
The pope offered the cardinalate to the Bishop of London William Courtenay though he refused the nomination.

- Tommaso da Frignano O.F.M.
- Pietro Pileo di Prata
- Francesco Moricotti Prignani
- Luca Rodolfucci de Gentili
- Andrea Bontempi Martini
- Bonaventura Badoaro de Peraga O.E.S.A.
- Niccolò Caracciolo Moschino O.P.
- Filippo Carafa
- Galeotto Tarlati de Petramala
- Giovanni d'Amelia
- Filippo Ruffini O.P.
- Poncello Orsini
- Bartolomeo Mezzavacca
- Renoul de Monteruc
- Gentile di Sangro
- Philippe d'Alençon de Valois
- Jan Očko z Vlašim
- Guglielmo Sanseverino
- Eleazario da Sabran
- Demetrius of Esztergom
- Agapito Colonna
- Ludovico di Capua
- Stefano Colonna
- Giovanni Fieschi

== 21 December 1381 ==
- Adam Easton O.S.B.
- Ludovico Donato O.F.M.
- Bartolomeo da Cogorno O.F.M.
- Francesco Renzio
- Landolfo Maramaldo
- Pietro Tomacelli

== 1383 ==
- Marino Giudice
- Tommaso Orsini
- Guglielmo di Capua

== 17 December 1384 ==
The pope was said to have offered the cardinalate to the Archbishop of Cologne Friedrich von Saarwerden and the Archbishop of Mainz Adolf von Nassau though both refused. In addition, the Archbishop of Trier Kuno von Falkenstein, the Bishop of Liège Arnold von Hoorn O.F.M., the Bishop of Breslau Wenzel von Liegnitz, and Pietro Orsini-Rosenberg (priest from Prague) all declined elevations to the cardinalate. The pope also offered three others the cardinalate, but these three men accepted the promotion from the pope's rival Antipope Clement VII.

- Bálint Alsáni
- Angelo Acciaioli
- Francesco Carbone O.Cist.
- Marino Bulcani
- Rinaldo Brancaccio
- Francesco Castagnola
- Ludovico Fieschi
- Stefano Palosio
- Angelo d'Anna de Sommariva O.S.B. Cam.

== Sources ==
- Miranda, Salvador. "Consistories for the creation of Cardinals, 14th Century (1303-1404): Urban VI (1378-1389) (Rome obedience)". The Cardinals of the Holy Roman Church. Florida International University. OCLC 53276621.
