= 1406 conclave =

Election of Catholic Pope Gregory XII

Papal conclave November 1406

Dates and location
- 18–30 November 1406; Rome, Papal States

Key officials
- Dean: Angelo Acciaioli
- Camerlengo: Corrado Caraccioli
- Protodeacon: Landolfo Maramaldo

Elected pope
- Angelo Correr; Name taken: Gregory XII
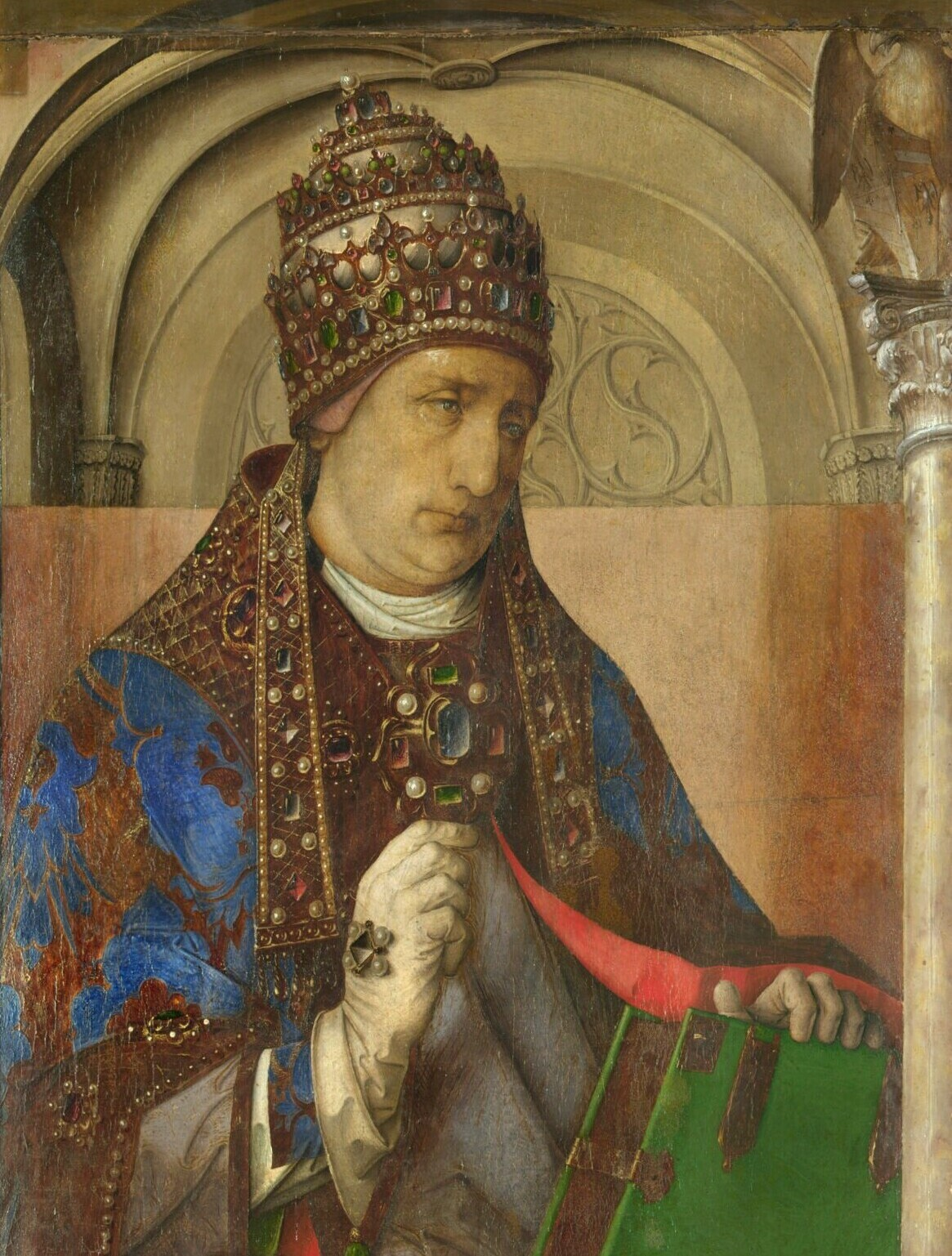

The 1406 papal conclave (18–30 November), the papal conclave of the time of the Great Western Schism, convened after the death of Pope Innocent VII. It elected Cardinal Angelo Correr, who took the name of Gregory XII.

== Cardinal electors ==
Pope Innocent VII died on 6 November 1406. At the time of his death, there were eighteen cardinals in the Roman Obedience of the College of Cardinals. Fourteen of them participated in the election of his successor:

Elector	Title	Elevated	Elevator	Notes
Angelo Acciaioli	Cardinal-Bishop of Ostia e Velletri	1384, December 17	Urban VI	Dean of the Sacred College of Cardinals; Vice-Chancellor of the Holy Roman Church; Archpriest of the patriarchal Vatican Basilica
Enrico Minutolo	Cardinal-Bishop of Frascati	1389, December 18	Boniface IX	Archpriest of the patriarchal Liberian Basilica; Camerlengo of the Sacred College of Cardinals
Antonio Caetani (seniore)	Cardinal-Bishop of Palestrina	1402, February 27	Boniface IX	Grand penitentiary; Archpriest of the patriarchal Lateran Basilica
Angelo d'Anna de Sommariva, O.S.B.Cam.	Cardinal-Priest of S. Pudenziana	1384, December 17	Urban VI	
Corrado Caraccioli	Cardinal-Priest of S. Crisogono	1405, June 12	Innocent VII	Camerlengo of the Holy Roman Church; Administrator of the see of Mileto
Angelo Correr	Cardinal-Priest of S. Marco	1405, June 12	Innocent VII	Latin Patriarch of Constantinople; Administrator of the see of Coron (elected Pope Gregory XII)
Giordano Orsini	Cardinal-Priest of SS. Silvestro e Martino ai Monti	1405, June 12	Innocent VII	Cardinal-protector of the Order of Franciscans
Giovanni Migliorati	Cardinal-Priest of S. Croce in Gerusalemme	1405, June 12	Innocent VII (Cardinal-nephew)	
Antonio Calvi	Cardinal-Priest S. Prassede	1405, June 12	Innocent VII	
Landolfo Maramaldo	Cardinal-Deacon of S. Nicola in Carcere Tulliano	1381, December 21	Urban VI	Protodeacon of the Sacred College of Cardinals; Legate in Perugia
Rinaldo Brancaccio	Cardinal-Deacon of SS. Vito e Modesto	1384, December 17	Urban VI	
Oddone Colonna	Cardinal-Deacon of S. Giorgio in Velabro	1405, June 12	Innocent VII	Bishop-elect of Urbino
Pietro Stefaneschi	Cardinal-Deacon of S. Angelo in Pescheria	1405, June 12	Innocent VII	
Jean Gilles	Cardinal-Deacon of SS. Cosma e Damiano	1405, June 12	Innocent VII	

All the electors were Italians, except of Jean Gilles, who was French. Four of them were elevated by Urban VI, two by Boniface IX, and eight by Innocent VII.

=== Absentee cardinals ===
Four cardinals, one created by Urban VI, one by Boniface IX and two by Innocent VII, did not participate in this conclave:

Elector	Title	Elevated	Elevator	Notes
Bálint Alsáni	Cardinal-Priest of S. Sabina	1384, December 17	Urban VI	Archpriest of the Sacred College of Cardinals; Administrator of Pécs
Francesco Uguccione	Cardinal-Priest of SS. IV Coronati	1405, June 12	Innocent VII	Administrator of Bordeaux
Pietro Filargo of Candia, O.F.M.	Cardinal-Priest of SS. XII Apostoli	1405, June 12	Innocent VII	Administrator of Milan
Baldassare Cossa	Cardinal-Deacon S. Eustachio	1402, February 27	Boniface IX	Legate in Romagna and Bologna

== The election of Pope Gregory XII ==
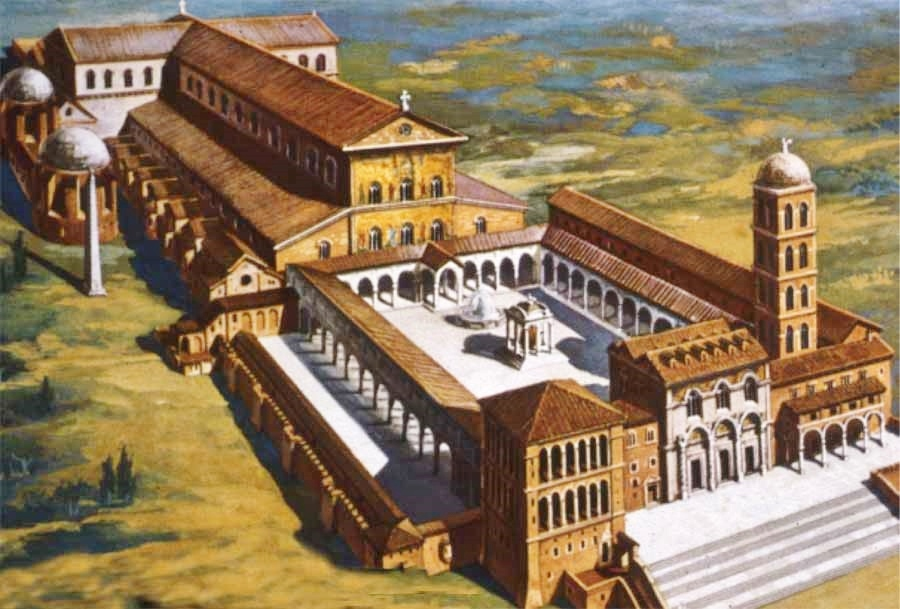
Old St. Peter's Basilica, site of the 1406 conclave

Fourteen cardinals present in Rome entered the conclave in Vatican on November 18, twelve days after the death of Innocent VII.

Initially, all the electors subscribed the conclave capitulation, in which each of them swore that, if elected, he would abdicate provided Antipope Benedict XIII did the same or should die; also, that he would not create new cardinals except to maintain parity of members with the Avignon cardinals; and that within three months he would enter into negotiations with his rival about a place of meeting.

Almost no further details about this conclave are known, except of its final result. On November 30 Cardinal Angelo Correr, proposed by Cardinal Caetani, was unanimously elected Pope, in spite of his very advanced age (probably ca. 80). He accepted his election and took the name of Gregory XII. Although he claimed the legality of his pontificate, nine years later he abdicated in the Council of Constance, making it possible to restore the unity of the Roman Catholic Church.
