= 1404 conclave =

Election of Catholic Pope Innocent VII

Papal conclave October 1404

Dates and location
- 10–17 October 1404; Rome, Papal States

Key officials
- Protodeacon: Ludovico Fieschi

Elected pope
- Cosimo de' Migliorati; Name taken: Innocent VII
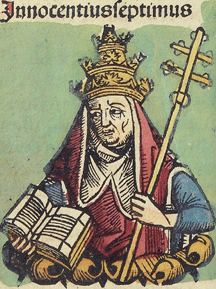

The 1404 papal conclave (10 October to 17 October) – the papal conclave of the time of the Great Western Schism, convened after the death of Pope Boniface IX, it elected Cardinal Cosimo de' Migliorati, who took the name of Innocent VII.

== Cardinal electors ==
Pope Boniface IX died on 1 October 1404. At the time of his death, there were only 12 cardinals in the Roman Obedience of the Sacred College. Nine of them participated in the election of his successor:

Elector	Order and titular church	Elevated	Elevator	Notes
Angelo Acciaioli	Cardinal-Priest of S. Lorenzo in Damaso	1384, December 17	Urban VI	
Francesco Carbone Tomacelli, O.Cist.	Cardinal-Priest of S. Susanna	1384, December 17	Urban VI	Grand penitentiary; Archpriest of the patriarchal Lateran Basilica
Angelo d'Anna de Sommariva, O.S.B.Cam.	Cardinal-Priest of S. Pudenziana	1384, December 17	Urban VI	
Enrico Minutolo	Cardinal-Priest of S. Anastasia	1389, December 18	Boniface IX	Archpriest of the patriarchal Liberian Basilica; Camerlengo of the Sacred College of Cardinals
Cosimo Gentile Migliorati (elected Pope Innocent VII)	Cardinal-Priest of S. Croce in Gerusalemme	1389, December 18	Boniface IX	
Cristoforo Maroni	Cardinal-Priest of S. Ciriaco	1389, December 18	Boniface IX	Archpriest of the patriarchal Vatican Basilica
Antonio Caetani (seniore)	Cardinal-Priest of S. Cecilia	1402, February 27	Boniface IX	
Landolfo Maramaldo	Cardinal-Deacon of S. Nicola in Carcere Tulliano	1381, December 21	Urban VI	
Rinaldo Brancaccio	Cardinal-Deacon of SS. Vito e Modesto	1384, December 17	Urban VI	

All the electors were Italians. Five of them were elevated by Pope Urban VI, and four by Boniface IX.

Camerlengo of the Holy Roman Church was at that time Corrado Caraccioli, bishop of Mileto.

=== Absentee cardinals ===
Three cardinals, two created by Urban VI and one by Boniface IX, did not participate in this conclave:

Elector	Order and titular church	Elevated	Elevator	Notes
Bálint Alsáni	Cardinal-Priest of S. Sabina	1384, December 17	Urban VI	Archpriest of the Sacred College of Cardinals; Administrator of the see of Pécs
Ludovico Fieschi	Cardinal-Deacon of S. Adriano	1384, December 17	Urban VI	Protodeacon of the Sacred College of Cardinals; Administrator of the see of Vercelli
Baldassare Cossa	Cardinal-Deacon of S. Eustachio	1402, February 27	Boniface IX	Legate in Romagna and Bologna

Hungarian Alsani was the only non-Italian Cardinal in the Roman Obedience.

== The election of Pope Innocent VII ==
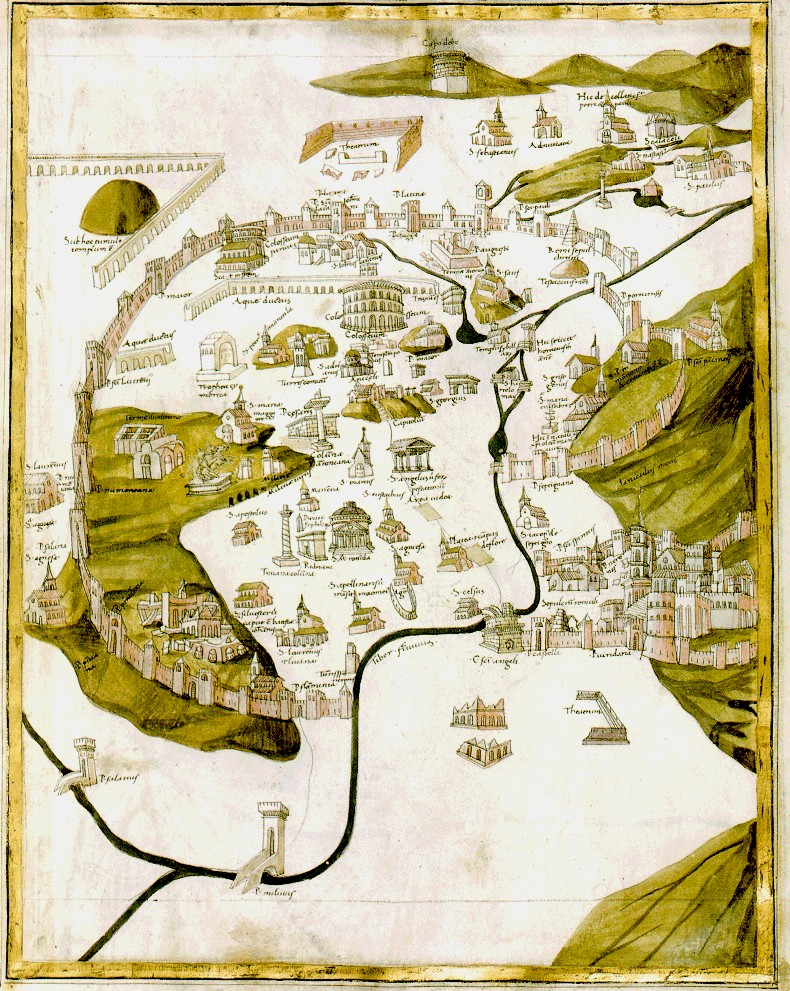
1471 map of Rome

Several churchmen and laymen urged "Roman" Cardinals not to elect the successor of Boniface IX and to recognise Benedict XIII of Avignon as Pope (or, at least, to wait for his death and then elect the new pope together with his adherents). Among the supporters of this point of view was Cardinal Protodeacon Ludovico Fieschi, who did not attend the conclave and later did not recognise its result.

In spite of this, nine cardinals present in Rome entered the conclave on October 10. Initially, they subscribed the conclave capitulation, which obliged whoever was elected to do everything possible (including abdication) in order to restore the unity of the Church. After seven days of deliberations Cardinal Cosimo Gentile Migliorati was unanimously elected pope and took the name of Innocent VII. Five days later Cardinal Fieschi officially abandoned the Roman Obedience and recognised Benedict XIII as true pope, so the rite of papal coronation on November 11 was performed by the new Protodeacon Landolfo Maramaldo.

== Bibliography ==
- Martin Souchon: Die Papstwahlen in der Zeit des grossen Schismas, Verlag von Benno Goeritz, 1888
