= 1389 conclave =

Election of Catholic Pope Boniface IX

Papal conclave October–November 1389

Dates and location
- 25 October – 2 November 1389; Apostolic Palace, Papal States

Key officials
- Dean: Francesco Moricotti Prignani
- Camerlengo: Marino Bulcani
- Protodeacon: Tommaso Orsini dei Conti

Elected pope
- Pietro Tomacelli; Name taken: Boniface IX
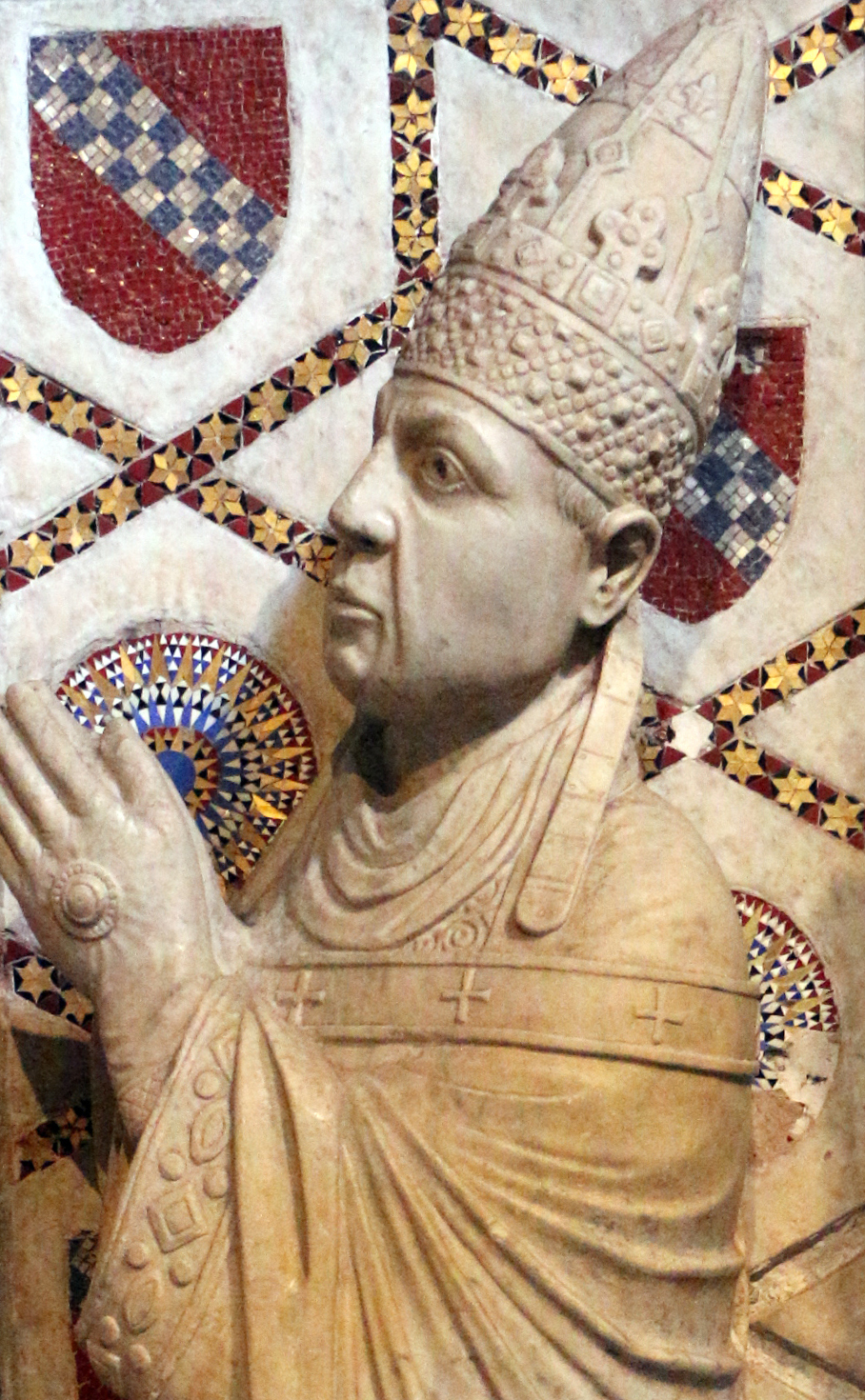

The 1389 conclave (25 October – 2 November) was convoked after the death of Pope Urban VI. The conclave is historically unique because all of the cardinal electors were the creation of a single pontiff: Urban VI, the very pope who was being replaced. None of the surviving cardinals created by previous popes recognized Urban VI as legitimate (see: Western Schism). In addition, Urban VI had deposed four of his creatures, and three were absent, leaving only sixteen cardinal electors.

== Cardinal electors ==
| Elector | Nationality | Order | Title | Elevated | Elevator | Notes |
|---|---|---|---|---|---|---|
| Francesco Moricotti Prignani | | Cardinal-bishop | Bishop of Palestrina | 18 September 1378 | Urban VI | Dean of the Sacred College of Cardinals; Vice-Chancellor of the Holy Roman Church |
| Andrea Bontempi Martini | | Cardinal-priest | Titulus Ss. Marcellino e Pietro | 18 September 1378 | Urban VI | Cardinal primoprete; administrator of the see of Perugia; legate in Picenum |
| Poncello Orsini | | Cardinal-priest | Titulus S. Clemente | 18 September 1378 | Urban VI | |
| Pietro Tomacelli | Neapolitan | Cardinal-priest | Titulus S. Anastasia | 21 December 1381 | Urban VI | Archpriest of the patriarchal Lateran Basilica; Elected Pope Boniface IX |
| Angelo Acciaioli | Florentine | Cardinal-priest | Titulus S. Lorenzo in Damaso. | 17 December 1384 | Urban VI | |
| Francesco Carbone Tomacelli, O.Cist. | | Cardinal-priest | Titulus S. Susanna | 17 December 1384 | Urban VI | Grand penitentiary |
| Stefano Palosio | | Cardinal-priest | Titulus S. Marcello. | 17 December 1384 | Urban VI | Administrator of the see of Todi |
| Tommaso Orsini dei Conti di Manupello | | Cardinal-deacon | Deacon of S. Maria in Domnica | Circa 1383—1379 | Urban VI | Protodeacon |
| Francesco Renzio | | Cardinal-deacon | Deacon of S. Eustachio | 21 December 1381 | Urban VI | Camerlengo of the Sacred College of Cardinals |
| Marino Bulcani | | Cardinal-deacon | Deacon of S. Maria Nuova. | 17 December 1384 | Urban VI | Camerlengo of the Holy Roman Church; Archpriest of the patriarchal Liberian Basilica |
| Rinaldo Brancaccio | | Cardinal-deacon | Deacon of Ss. Vito e Modesto | 17 December 1384 | Urban VI | |
| Ludovico Fieschi | | Cardinal-deacon | Deacon of S. Adriano | 17 December 1384 | Urban VI | Administrator of the see of Vercelli; Vicar General of the States of the Church |
| Angelo d'Anna de Sommariva, O.Camald. | | Cardinal-deacon | Deacon of S. Lucia in Septisolio | 17 December 1384 | Urban VI | |

=== Absentee cardinals ===
| Elector | Nationality | Order | Title | Elevated | Elevator | Notes |
|---|---|---|---|---|---|---|
| Philippe of Alençon | French | Cardinal-bishop | Bishop of Ostia e Velletri | 18 September 1378 | Urban VI | Archpriest of the patriarchal Vatican Basilica |
| Adam Easton, O.S.B. | English | Cardinal-priest | Titulus S. Cecilia | 21 December 1381 | Urban VI | He was deprived of cardinalate by Urban VI in 1385 and was not considered a valid elector in October 1389 (he was reinstated in December of that year) |
| Valentin d'Alsan | Hungarian | Cardinal-priest | Titulus Ss. IV Coronati (or S. Sabina) | 17 December 1384 | Urban VI | Administrator of the see of Pécs |
