= Cardinals created by Boniface IX =

Catholic appointments from 1389 to 1402

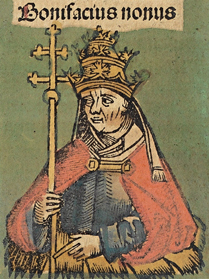
Pope Boniface IX (r. 1389–1404)

Pope Boniface IX (r. 1389–1404) created 8 cardinals in two consistories held during his pontificate including his future successor Pope Innocent VII and the Antipope John XXIII.

== 18 December 1389 ==
- Enrico Minutoli
- Bartolomeo Oleario O.F.M.
- Cosmato Gentile de' Migliorati
- Cristoforo Maroni

== 27 February 1402 ==
- Antonio Caetani
- Baldassare Cossa
- Leonardo Cibo (or Cybo)
- Angelo Cibo (or Cybo)

== Sources ==
- Miranda, Salvador. "Consistories for the creation of Cardinals 14th Century (1303-1404): Boniface IX". The Cardinals of the Holy Roman Church. Florida International University. OCLC 53276621.
