= Angelo d'Anna de Sommariva =

Italian cardinal

Angelo d'Anna de Sommariva (Lodi, circa 1340 – Rome, 21 July 1428) was an Italian cardinal.

== Biography ==
Coming from an influential noble family from Lodi, Lombardy, but with ties to the Neapolitan aristocracy, he entered the Camaldolese Congregation in a convent near Lodi at a young age.

In the consistory of 17 December 1384, Pope Urban VI appointed him Cardinal deacon of Santa Lucia in Septisolio. He was sent to Sicily as Apostolic nuncio of Pope Boniface IX.

Having become Cardinal Protodeacon in 1394, in 1396 he opted for the title of Cardinal priest of Santa Pudenziana and in 1408 he became Protopriest. In 1409 he abandoned Roman obedience for that of Pisa, participating in the election of the Antipope Alexander V and subsequently in that of the Antipope John XXIII. In 1412 he opted for the title of Cardinal Bishop of Palestrina and was Papal Legate in Naples. He took part in the Council of Constance. He was also Abbot in commendam of the Casamari Abbey.

In 1426 he became Dean of the Sacred College, the second highest position in the Vatican behind the Pope.

Upon his death, his body was buried in the church of Santa Maria di Portanova in Naples.

=== Conclaves ===
During his cardinalate, Angelo d'Anna de Sommaria participated in the following conclaves:

- 1389 papal conclave, which elected Pope Boniface IX
- 1404 papal conclave, which elected Pope Innocent VII
- 1406 papal conclave, which elected Pope Gregory XII
- 1409 papal conclave, which elected Antipope Alexander V
- 1410 papal conclave, which elected Antipope John XXIII
- 1417 papal conclave, which elected Pope Martin V

== Sources ==
- Alfred A. Strnad, D'ANNA SOMMARIVA, Angelo, in Dizionario biografico degli italiani, vol. 32, Istituto dell'Enciclopedia Italiana, 1986.
- David M. Cheney, Angelo d'Anna de Sommariva, in Catholic Hierarchy. Edit on Wikidata
- Salvador Miranda, ANNA DE SOMMARIVA, O.S.B.Cam., Angelo d', on fiu.edu – The Cardinals of the Holy Roman Church, Florida International University.

Catholic Church titles
Preceded by Jean-Allarmet de Brogny	Dean of the College of Cardinals; 1426 – 1428	Succeeded by Giordano Orsini
