= Ludovico Fieschi =

Italian cardinal

Ludovico Fieschi (died 3 April 1423) was a cardinal during the Western Schism.

Fieschi came from Genoa, from the family of the counts of Lavagna, a family from which the 13th-century Pope Adrian V and some other cardinals came. On 29 March 1382, he was elected bishop of Vercelli. On 17 December 1384 "Roman" pope Urban VI appointed him cardinal deacon of the church of San Adriano. In July 1385 he released Urban VI from the siege of Nocera. In 1388 he became vicar general of the papal territories. He participated in the conclave of 1389. Fieschi served as the legate of Pope Boniface IX in Genoa and Campania. Around 1403/04, however, he began to distance himself from this pope, which was related to the change of direction of his homeland, Genoa. When Boniface died, Fieschi urged "Roman" Cardinals not to elect a successor and to recognise Benedict XIII of Avignon as Pope (or, at least, to wait for his death and then elect the new pope together with his adherents. Therefore, he did not attend the Conclave of 1404 and did not recognise Innocent VII as the new pope. In October 1404 he officially recognised Benedict XIII. Benedict received him at Avignon on 11 May 1405 and confirmed his position. Benedict appointed him as administrator of the diocese of Carpentras per 31 October 1406. He did not attend the Council of Pisa (1409), but recognised Pope Alexander V, thus leaving the Avignon obedience. Alexander V appointed him vicar in Forli. He served as the legate of Alexander's successor John XXIII in Bologna and Ferrara. Administrator of the Sabbath diocese of Sabina from June to September 1412. He participated in the Council of Constance that ended the schism in 1417. He was legate of Pope Martin V in Sicily from 1420 and 1421. He died in Rome, but his remains were resting in Genoa Cathedral.

== Bibliography ==
- Ludovico Fieschi
