= Francesco Carbone Tomacelli =

Italian cardinal

Francesco Carbone Tomacelli (died 18 June 1405) was an Italian cardinal at the time of the Great Western Schism. He was nephew (possibly adopted) of Pope Boniface IX.

He was born in Naples and in his youth entered the Order of Cistercians. He supported Pope Urban VI against the claims of Antipope Clement VII after the election of the latter in 1378. He was elected bishop of Monopoli at the end of 1382 and in the consistory of 17 December 1384 he was created cardinal. Legate in the Kingdom of Naples to secure its support for the Roman Obedience. Grand penitentiary and archpriest of the patriarchal Lateran Basilica from 1389 until his death. He participated in the papal conclave, 1389. He became close adviser of the new pope Boniface IX, who was his uncle. He participated in the papal conclave, 1404. He acted also as cardinal-protector of the Order of Franciscans. First commendatario of the abbey of Farfa in 1400. He died at Rome, quite suddenly. Shortly before his death Innocent VII named him Cardinal-Bishop of Sabina (12 June 1405).

== Sources ==
- Miranda, Salvador. "CARBONE, O.Cist., Francesco (First half of the 14th century-1405)". The Cardinals of the Holy Roman Church. Florida International University. OCLC 53276621.
- Martin Souchon: Die Papstwahlen in der Zeit des grossen Schismas, Verlag von Benno Goeritz, 1888
