= Pietro Pileo di Prata =

Italian bishop and Cardinal

Cardinal Pietro Pileo di Prata
- Cardinal-Bishop
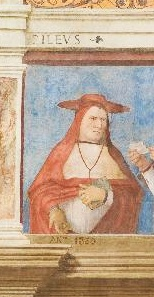
- Church: Santa Prassede (1378-1384)
- Diocese: Tusculum (1384-1387; 1391-1399); Ravenna (1370-1387); Padua (1359-1370)

Orders
- Created cardinal: 18 September 1378 by Pope Urban VI
- Rank: Cardinal Priest, then Cardinal Bishop

Personal details
- Born: c. 1330 Castello di Prata
- Died: c. 1399 Rome
- Buried: Santa Maria del Popolo, Rome, then cathedral of Padua
- Residence: Padua, Ravenna, Rome, Avignon
- Parents: Count Bianchino di Prata; Iselgarda di Carrara
- Occupation: diplomat, administrator
- Profession: bishop
- Education: University of Padua
- Coat of arms

Pietro Pileo di Prata (or da Prata) (c.1330–1400) was an Italian bishop and cardinal. He was a significant diplomat and go-between in the affairs of his times, and was nicknamed the "cardinal with three hats", which he obtained successively from Urban VI, Clement VII, and Boniface IX.

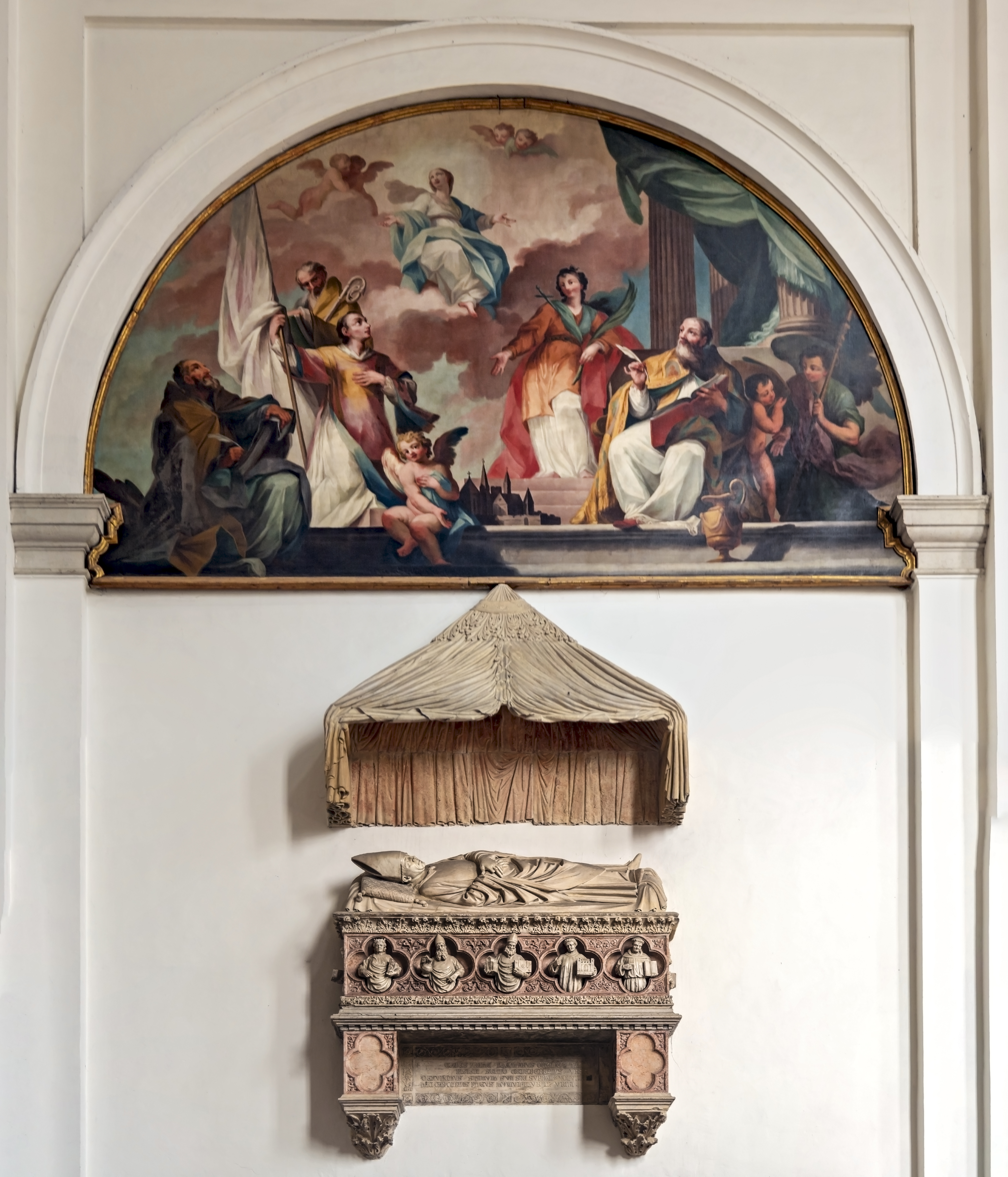
Padua Cathedral - tomb of the cardinal Pileo da Prata.

== Early life ==
Pileo was the son of Count Bianchino and Iselgarda da Carrara, the sister of Jacopino da Carrara. He was born in the Castello di Prata in the diocese of Concordia or, perhaps, in Padua itself.

He was patronized by the family of Francesco il Vecchio da Carrara, lord of Padua. He was a Canon of the cathedral of Padua in 1350 at the age of twenty, and held the dignity of Archpriest from 1356, though he was only in minor orders, when he was appointed bishop of Treviso by Pope Clement VI on 1 June 1358. As bishop-elect, he initially had a Vicar General, Giorgio Torti of Pavia, and he is recorded as bishop as late as 28 June 1359. He did not enter Treviso, however, due to the hostility of the clergy and citizens and the hostility of the Venetians against Francesco di Carrara, whose family were patrons of the bishop.

=== Bishop of Padua ===
Pileo was appointed bishop of Padua by Pope Innocent VI on 12 June 1359. As bishop, he summoned and presided over a diocesan synod on 8 March 1360. At exactly the same time, he was involved in his capacity as Grand Chancellor of the University of Padua, in mediating a dispute between the Law Faculty and the Arts Faculty, as to whether there should be one university or two. On 20 March 1360, he issued his decision, that there should be two institutions, but that the Rector of the Arts should swear to obey the statutes of the Law Faculty. In 1361, he modified the statutes of the cathedral Chapter, allowing younger Canons who were studying at the university to do so without penalty for their absence from their cathedral duties. Bishop Pileo also obtained from Pope Urban V a chair in theology for the University of Padua, only the third such chair to be established, after Paris and Bologna. In 1394, he founded the Collegio Pratense in Padua, for the benefit of scholars studying at the University of Padua, and provided for the institution in his Testament of 1399.

=== Archbishop of Ravenna ===
On 23 January 1370, he was named archbishop of Ravenna by Pope Urban V. When he was named a cardinal in 1378, he relinquished the episcopal throne, but continued on as Administrator of the diocese. In 1372, Pope Gregory XI summoned Pileo to Avignon, and sent the archbishop along with the Bishop of Carpentras, Guillaume l'Estrange, as his nuncios to King Charles V of France. They were instructed to obtain a truce, and to bring representatives of France, England, and Navarre together to compose their differences. A conference took place in Bruxelles in 1374, with Archbishop Pileo and the Bishop of Carpentras serving as papal nuncios. Louis of Anjou and Philip of Burgundy took part. Pope Gregory wrote a letter to the King of France, threatening ecclesiastical censures against those who should reject the proposals of the nuncios. The most they could obtain was a truce in 1375, which was extended to 1377. The sticking point was Calais, which the English absolutely refused to surrender, and therefore the war continued.

In 1376, Archbishop Pileo was drawn into the expansionist military adventures of Barnabò Visconti of Milan, who threatened Tuscany as well as territories belonging to the papacy, including Bologna and the Patrimony of S. Peter. The archbishop was ordered by Pope Gregory to support his Cardinal Legate in Bologna and the Marchese d'Este with the sum of 500 gold florins charged against the archbishop's income as bishop. The raising of the required sums brought the archbishop a bad reputation as a despoiler of church property. At the same time, a Ghibelline rebellion in Ravenna cut the archbishop off from his source of income.

In 1377, an opportunity arose which might have allowed Pope Gregory to repay Archbishop Pileo for his expenses in the papal diplomatic service, and to compensate him for his losses in Ravenna. The diocese of Tournai had become available, and Pileo was proposed for the post. But he was not eager to leave an archbishopric for a bishopric, unless he could hold Ravenna in commendam along with Tournai. The pope was willing to name him a patriarch along with Tournai, but at the moment no patriarchate was available, and the pope was set against holding two bishoprics at the same time. All he could promise Pileo, as he wrote on 4 January 1378 in his letter of refusal, was that the subject would be revisited at the next patriarchal vacancy. As it happened, Pope Gregory died on 27 March 1378.

=== Cardinal ===
Pileo di Prato was named a cardinal by Urban VI on 18 September 1378, and assigned the church of Santa Prassede as his titular church. His first duty was to write a letter to the King of France, explaining the election of Urban, and arguing for its canonical validity. Writing from Venice on 15 December 1378, he also posted a lengthy letter to Count Louis of Flanders.

Urban VI had sent him as a legate to Germany and Hungary, a journey made all the more critical since the Emperor Charles IV had died on 29 November 1378, and his successor Wenceslaus had sent representatives to Rome. Wenceslaus was promising obedience to Urban VI, and was seeking an imperial coronation. Pileo followed Wenceslaus to Mainz, Cologne, and Aix-la-Chapelle. The electors of Mainz and Cologne were important for the election of a Holy Roman Emperor. Pileo took the opportunity to lobby bishops on behalf of Urban VI's legitimacy, but Leopold of Austria and Wenceslaus of Brabant were pressing the new King of the Romans to summon a general council to deal with the growing schism, a move which would have called into question exactly what Pileo was promoting. He is said to have counselled Wenceslaus to resist the demands.

In 1381, Pileo was sent along with several German nobles to arrange a marriage between King Wenceslaus' sister, Anne of Bohemia, and King Richard II of England, who were married in January 1382. He is accused of having used his legatine powers to the maximum while he was in England, lifting excommunications and cancelling vows of pilgrimage, receiving generous gifts for his services. He was greedy for money. The Cardinal was back in Italy by 4 September 1382, where he visited Prata and manumitted all of his serfs, both there and elsewhere.

=== Naples ===
In October 1383, Pope Urban determined on a visit to the Kingdom of Naples. He took with him six cardinals, among them Pileo di Prata, and the papal court. The pope was extremely dissatisfied with the situation following the French invasion by Louis of Anjou, a supporter of the Avignon Pope Clement VII, and the passive defense offered by King Charles of Durazzo. He was equally dissatisfied with Charles' casual reception of his overlord into the Kingdom of Naples, but continued on to the city. The Neapolitans hated Urban, since many were still loyal to their original allegiance to Pope Clement VII in Avignon, whom Queen Joanna I had recognized as the true pope. They were hostile to Charles of Durazzo, who had murdered Queen Joanna and had frustrated Louis of Anjou's expedition. The pope's real purpose was to enhance his own family's fortune, in particular those of his nephew, Francesco Butillo, who had been cheated by Charles of Durazzo out of his share of the spoils of the destruction of the expedition of Louis of Anjou. A favorable opinion of the Neapolitans was solicited by the marriage of two of the pope's nieces to Neapolitan noblemen, but on Christmas Eve his nephew Francesco reversed it all by breaking into a convent and raping a noble Neapolitan nun. The pope quashed the legal proceedings against Francesco, and helped him to escape to his fief at Nocera. In June 1384, Pope Urban was forced to leave Naples and seek refuge with his nephew at Nocera. In August, however, the cardinals who were at Nocera and many of the curiales fled to Naples.

On 17 December 1384, Pope Urban held a consistory at Nocera, and Cardinal Pileo was promoted from Cardinal Priest of S. Prassede to the post of suburbicarian Bishop of Tusculum (Frascati). Several prelates were offered a cardinal's hat, but declined: Archbishop Fridericus de Saarwerden of Cologne, Archbishop Adolfus de Naasau of Mainz, Archbishop Cuno de Falkenstein of Trier, Bishop Arnoldus de Horn of Liege, Bishop Wenceslaus de Silesia-Liegnitz of Bratislava, and Father Petrus de Rosenberg of Prague. Nine prelates accepted.

Meanwhile, Cardinal Bartolomeo Mezzavacca, who was residing in Naples, set in motion an inquiry, led by the curialist Bartolomeo of Piacenza, to examine the question of deposing a pope if he were judged insane. He also consulted masters of theology and several Doctores in utroque iure, as well as King Charles and Queen Margarita. Urban VI heard of the consultations, and on 11 January 1385, he ordered the arrest of those cardinals within his reach: Joannes de Amelia, Gentilis de Sangro, Adam de Eston, Ludovicus Donati, Bartholomaeus de Cucurno, and Martinus de Judice. All except for Eston were killed at Genoa in December 1386 on orders of Urban VI

After the torture of the six cardinals began in the dungeons of the castle of Nocera, to which Theoderic of Nyem was a witness, five of the cardinals at liberty, led by Pileo di Prata, wrote an open letter to the clergy of Rome, detailing Urban's cruelties and furies, announcing that Urban VI was a heretic, and that they were withdrawing from his Obedience. Four of the five cardinals were deposed from their cardinalates, bringing the number of deposed cardinals to ten. The cardinals' letter was supported by the Abbot of Montecassino, who was also excommunicated.

Pileo fled to Genoa, where he and Cardinal Galeazzo Tarlati da Petramala repudiated Urban and sought refuge in Avignon. Pileo was denounced by Urban VI as a "son of iniquity" in a bull of 25 August 1385, written at Lucca; and on 5 October 1385 he deprived Pileo of his cardinalate, his bishopric of Tusculum, and the archbishopric of Ravenna.

=== Avignon ===
On 13 June 1387 Pileo joined the Obedience of the Avignon Pope Clement VII, who named him Cardinal Priest of Santa Prisca; he lost his precedence as a cardinal bishop. Having become exasperated at the negotiations of the Florentines, to whom he had suggested a general council to resolve the schism, Pope Clement VII assembled an army, mostly of Gascons and Bretons, and, on 4 May 1388, appointed Cardinal Pileo as his legate for Tuscany and Lombardy. Pileo again made overtures to the Florentines, but Urban's cardinal, Angelo Acciaolo, persuaded the Florentines to reject them. Florence was reduced, in part thanks to citizens favorable to Avignon, and after a successful storming of the city by the Gascons and Bretons. Pileo and the army, joined by the forces of Rinaldo Orsini, then moved against Orvieto, which they seized and in which they installed a friendly government. They then took Terni, Narni, Montefiascone, and Spoleto.

After Urban VI's death on 15 October 1389, the new pope of the Roman Obedience, Boniface IX (Pietro Tomacelli of Naples), restored three of Urban's deposed cardinals to their positions: Adam Eston, Bartolomeo Mezzavacca, and Landolfo Maramaldo. Cardinal Pileo was reinstated in the Roman Obedience by Pope Boniface IX in his previous post as Bishop of Tusculum, but not until 13 February 1391. He did not recover the Archbishopric of Ravenna, since Urban VI had assigned it to Cardinal Cosimo Migliorati. Clement VII labelled him infamem transfugam, impostorem, ac fidei venalis hominem (a disreputable turncoat, an imposter, and a man with his loyalty for sale).

In 1392, Pope Boniface appointed Cardinal Pileo his Legate in Umbria, the Romagna, and the Marches, with a salary of 3,000 zecchini. He helped the pope by loosening the grip of the Malatesta family on Todi, and he calmed the strife between Guelfs and Ghibellines in Perugia, at least for a short time.

In 1394, Cardinal Pileo obtained permission to return home, and he departed Rome on 4 May. After a visit to Prata, and a reception in Venice, by October he returned to Padua. He informed Francesco II of his intention to found a college for students at the University of Padua, and the Lord of Padua obliged him by giving him a house in the Contrada of S. Margherita. Thus began the Collegio Pratense. He is next heard of in 1397, when he was back in Rome by 5 September.

He may have become Dean of the College of Cardinals in 1397, as the most senior Cardinal Bishop after the death of Philippe of Alençon.

On Christmas Eve 1398, the Pope was ill, and Cardinal Pileo di Prata presided at the Vespers service in the larger chapel. He also sang the third Mass of Christmas Day.

In 1398, he was assigned to a commission of three cardinals to judge the crimes of Count Onorato Caetani of Fondi, who had been the protector of the adherents of Clement VII (Robert of Geneva) since April 1378. Count Onorato was found guilty on 2 May 1399, and had ecclesiastical censures imposed on him.

The Cardinal drew up his last will and testament in Rome, on 4 October 1399.

Cardinal Pileo died in Rome in December 1399 or early in 1400. The Chapter of the cathedral of Padua appointed a procurator to deal with the Testament of the cardinal on 24 June 1400, noting that the late cardinal was buried in the chapel of S. John the Evangelist.

== Sources ==
- Cardella, Lorenzo (1793). Memorie storiche de' cardinali della Santa Romana Chiesa. Vol. II. Roma: Pagliarini 1793, pp. 255–264. (in Italian)
- Dondi dall'Orologio, Francesco Scipione; Pilleo di Prata, Pietro (1795). Sinodo inedito, e notizie della di lui vita (in Italian). Padova: Penada.
- Dondi dall' Orologio, Francesco Scipione (1815). Dissertazioni sopra l'istoria ecclesiastica di Padova (in Italian). Vol. Dissertazione VIII. Padova: tipografia del Seminario. pp. 106–112.
- Eubel, Conradus, ed. (1913). Hierarchia catholica (in Latin). Vol. Tomus I (second ed.). Münster: Libreria Regensbergiana.
- Gianni, Luca (2014). "Un testamento, una famiglia, una villa. I signori di Prata a Fiumicino," Atti dell'Accademia San Marco 16 (2014), pp. 857–874. (in Italian)
- Hortis, Attilio (1875). Giovanni Boccacci ambasciatore in Avignone e Pileo da Prata proposto da' Fiorentini a Patriarca di Aquileia (in Italian). Trieste: Herrmanstorfer.
- Kohl, Benjamin G. (1998). Padua Under the Carrara, 1318-1405. Baltimore: Johns Hopkins University Press. ISBN 978-0-8018-5703-4.
- Stacul, Paolo (1957). Il cardinale Pileo da Prata (in Italian). Roma: Presso la Società alla Biblioteca vallicelliana. ISBN 978-88-97808-78-7.
- Zanutto, Luigi (1901). Il cardinale Pileo di Prata e la sua prima legazione in Germania: 1378-1382 (in Italian). Udine: Tip. Domenico del Bianco.
