= Banneret (disambiguation) =

A banneret, or knight banneret, was a medieval knight who led a company of troops during time of war under his own banner.

Banneret may also refer to:

- Banneret (Rome), an officer or magistrate of Rome towards the close of the 14th century
- Unions-Banneret, newsletter of the Baptist Union of Norway from 1880
- Banneret Ugham, character in book series The Keys to the Kingdom
- HMT Banneret, a civilian trawler requisitioned by the Royal Navy for use in World War II
