= Angelo Acciaioli (cardinal) =

Italian Catholic cardinal

Angelo II Acciaioli (15 April 1349 - 31 May 1408) was an Italian Catholic cardinal.

== Biography ==
Born in Florence, Angelo was elected Bishop of Rapolla in 1375, but in 1383 he was transferred to the see of Florence where he had been preceded by a previous family member many years before, Angelo Acciaioli. He was promoted to the cardinalate on 17 December 1384 by Pope Urban VI. He defended legality of the election of Urban VI and his successors against the claims of the antipopes Clement VII and Benedict XIII. In the Papal conclave, 1389 he was actively working on being elected to the papacy, but an anonymous narrative of the Conclave accuses him of simony (bribery), managing thereby to acquire six votes of the thirteen cardinals in the Conclave.

He was legate of Pope Boniface IX in the Kingdom of Naples in 1390 and in Hungary in 1403. As papal legate, Angelo crowned king Ladislaus of Naples in Gaeta on 29 May 1390. He reformed the Benedictine monastery S. Paolo fuori le mura in Rome and participated in the papal conclave, 1404. Newly elected Pope Innocent VII named him archpriest of the patriarchal Vatican Basilica (shortly after 4 December 1404), Cardinal-Bishop of Ostia e Velletri (12 June 1405), Dean of the Sacred College of Cardinals (12 June 1405), and finally Vice-Chancellor of the Holy Roman Church (on 29 August 1405). He presided over the papal conclave, 1406. He died in Pisa at the age of 59. His remains were transferred to the Carthusian monastery in Florence.

In January 1394, King Ladislaus of Naples named him as his bailli and vicar-general for the Principality of Achaea and Lepanto. At the same time, he received the position of Latin Archbishop of Patras.

== Sources ==
- Bon, Antoine (1969). La Morée franque. Recherches historiques, topographiques et archéologiques sur la principauté d'Achaïe [The Frankish Morea. Historical, Topographic and Archaeological Studies on the Principality of Achaea] (in French). Paris: De Boccard. OCLC 869621129.
- The Florentine church, Archbishop Curia, Florence 1970.
- Litta Biumi, Pompeo. "Acciaioli di Firenze". Famiglie celebri italiane (in Italian). Milano: Luciano Basadonna Editore. OCLC 799338549.
- Setton, Kenneth M. (1975). Catalan Domination of Athens 1311–1380. London: Variorum.
- Curzio Ugurgieri della Berardenga, Gli Acciaioli di Firenze nella Luce de' Loro Tempi, Leo Olschki, 1962.
- Martin Souchon: Die Papstwahlen in der Zeit des grossen Schismas, Verlag von Benno Goeritz, 1888

=== Acknowledgment ===
- Herbermann, Charles, ed. (1913). "Acciajuoli" . Catholic Encyclopedia. New York: Robert Appleton Company.

Catholic Church titles
Preceded by Philippe of Alençon	Cardinal-bishop of Ostia; 1405–1408	Succeeded by Jean-Allarmet de Brogny
Preceded by Paul Foscari	Archbishop of Patras; 1395–1400	Succeeded by Stephen Zaccaria
Preceded by Angelo Ricasoli	Bishop of Florence; 1383–1385	Succeeded by Bartolomeo Oleario
Preceded by ?	Bishop of Rapolla; 1375–1383	Succeeded by ?
