= Antonio Caetani (seniore) =

Italian cardinal (1360–1412)

His Eminence Antonio Caetani
- Cardinal-Bishop of Porto e Santa Rufina
- Church: Roman Catholic Church
- Appointed: 2 July 1409
- Term ended: 11 January 1412
- Other posts: Archpriest of the Basilica of Saint John Lateran (1405-12); Major Penitentiary of the Apostolic Penitentiary (1405-12)
- Previous posts: Patriarch of Aquilea (1395-1402); Cardinal-Priest of Santa Cecilia (1402-05); Cardinal-Bishop of Palestrina (1405-09); Apostolic Administrator of Fiesole (1409-11)

Orders
- Created cardinal: 27 February 1402 by Pope Boniface IX
- Rank: Cardinal-Priest (1402-05); Cardinal-Bishop (1405-12)

Personal details
- Born: Antonio Caetani; 1360 Rome, Papal States
- Died: 11 January 1412 (aged 52) Rome, Papal States

Antonio Caetani, seniore (1360–1412) was a Roman Catholic cardinal.

Catholic Church titles
Preceded by Marquard von Randeck	Patriarch of Aquileia; 1395–1402	Succeeded by Antonio Panciera
Preceded by Guy de Boulogne	Cardinal-Priest of Santa Cecilia; 1402–1405	Succeeded by Antonio de Challant
Preceded by Francesco Moricotti Prignani Butillo	Cardinal-Bishop of Palestrina; 1405–1409	Succeeded by Angelo d'Anna de Sommariva
Preceded by Antonio Correr	Cardinal-Bishop of Porto e Santa Rufina; 1409–1412	Succeeded by Louis de Bar
Preceded by	Administrator of Fiesole; 1409–1411	Succeeded by Benozzo Federighi
