= Dean of the College of Cardinals =

Position in the Catholic Church

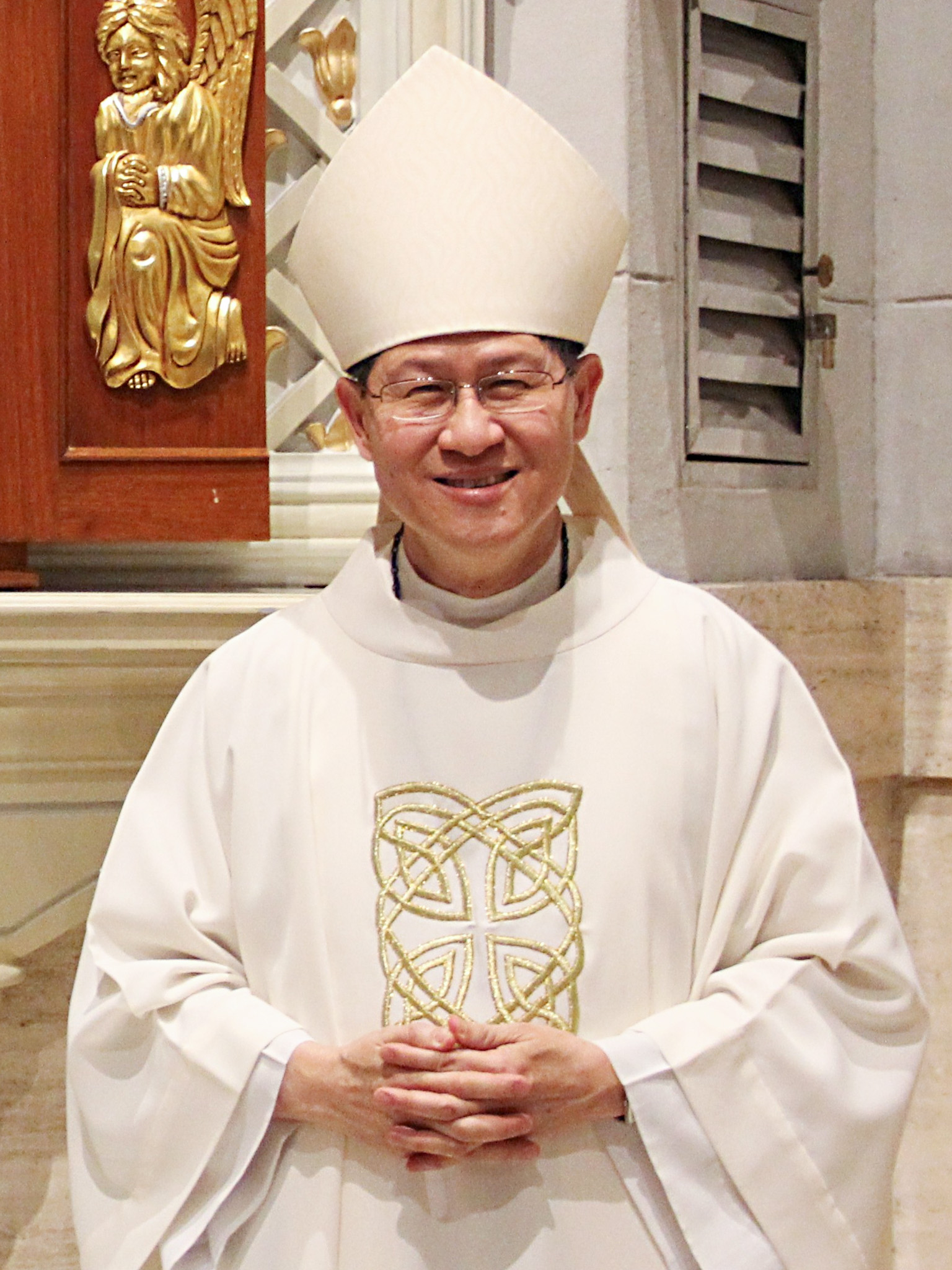
Luis Antonio Tagle, the incumbent dean

The dean of the College of Cardinals (Latin: Decanus Collegii Sanctae Romanae Ecclesiae Cardinalium) presides over the College of Cardinals in the Catholic Church, serving as primus inter pares ('first among equals'). The position was established in the 12th century. He always holds the rank of a cardinal bishop and is assisted by a vice-dean. Both are elected by and from the cardinal bishops who are not Eastern Catholic patriarchs, with their election subject to papal confirmation. Except for presiding over the college, the dean and vice-dean have no power over the other cardinals.

For centuries, the cardinal bishop who had been a bishop of a suburbicarian see the longest was the dean. This custom became a requirement with the canon law of 1917. (Note: Quote: "Sacro Cardinalium Collegio praeest Decanus, idest antiquior promotione ad aliquam Sedem suburbicariam, cui tamen nulla est in ceteros Cardinales iurisdictio, sed ipse primus habetur inter aequales." Translation: "The Sacred College of Cardinals is presided over by a Dean, that one who is senior by promotion to any suburbicarian See, who, however, has no jurisdiction over the other Cardinals, but he is held first among equals.") On 26 February 1965, Pope Paul VI empowered the cardinal bishops to elect the dean from among their number. (Note: For the remainder of Paul VI's papacy, the cardinal bishops followed tradition and elected as dean the cardinal who had been a cardinal bishop the longest. When Agnelo Rossi was elected dean in 1984, he had been a cardinal bishop for just two and a half years, less than three other cardinal bishops: Sebastiano Baggio, Paolo Bertoli, Francesco Carpino.) Both the dean and subdean must reside in Rome.

Until December 2019, the dean held the position until death or resignation; there was no mandatory age of retirement. Then, upon accepting Cardinal Angelo Sodano's resignation as dean of the College of Cardinals, Pope Francis established that the dean would henceforth serve a five-year term that may be renewed once. In anticipation of the election of a new dean, Francis said: "I am hoping they will elect someone who can carry this important responsibility full time." Nevertheless, on 6 February 2025, the Pope extended Cardinal Re's mandate as dean.

The current dean as of 9 October 2026 is Luis Antonio Tagle, Pro-Prefect of the Dicastery for Evangelization, who also is concurrently cardinal-bishop of the Suburbicarian Diocese of Ostia and the Suburbicarian Diocese of Albano.

== Responsibilities ==
The dean summons the conclave for the purposes of electing a new pope following a death or resignation. The dean presides over the daily meetings of the College of Cardinals in advance of the conclave and then presides over the conclave unless his age prohibits his participation. The dean also has the responsibility of communicating the "news of the Pope's death to the Diplomatic Corps accredited to the Holy See and to the Heads of the respective Nations". He is the public face of the Holy See until a new pope is elected. If he participates in the conclave, the dean asks the pope-elect if he accepts the election, and then asks the new pope what name he wishes to use. If the dean himself is elected pope, the aforementioned tasks are assumed by the sub-dean of the College of Cardinals. If the newly elected pope is not already a bishop, the dean ordains him a bishop.

The dean has "the title of the diocese of Ostia, together with that of any other church to which he already has a title," such as his suburbicarian diocese. This has been the case since 1914, by decree of Pope Pius X – previous deans had given up their suburbicarian see and taken the joint title of Ostia and Velletri, which were separated in that same 1914 decree.

== Deans elected pope ==
Nine deans have been elected pope:

1. Corrado Demitri, elected Pope Anastasius IV in 1153
2. Ubaldo Allucingoli, elected Pope Lucius III in 1181
3. Ugolino di Conti was elected Pope Gregory IX in 1227
4. Rinaldo di Jenne was elected Pope Alexander IV in 1254
5. Pedro Julião was elected Pope John XXI in September 1276
6. Roderic de Borja was elected Pope Alexander VI in 1492
7. Alessandro Farnese was elected Pope Paul III in 1534
8. Gian Pietro Carafa was elected Pope Paul IV in May 1555
9. Joseph Ratzinger was elected Pope Benedict XVI in 2005

== List of deans ==
The following is the list of deans of the Sacred College of Cardinals, separated into three groups to account for the Western Schism, which ended after the Council of Constance. The earliest attested reference to the "College of Cardinals" is at the Council of Reims in 1148.

Each name in the following list includes years of birth and death, then comma-separated years of cardinalate and deanship.

=== Before the Western Schism ===
==== 12th century ====
- Pietro Senex (d. 1134) (1102, before 1130)
- Guillaume (d. 1137/1139) (1122, 1130)
- Corrado della Suburra (1073–1154) (1114, 1137/1139)
  Elected Pope Anastasius IV in 1153
- Imar of Tusculum (d. 1161) (1142, 1153, deposed 1159)
- Gregorio de Suburra (d. 1163) (1140, 1159)
- Ubaldo Allucingoli (1097–1185) (1138, 1163)
  Elected Pope Lucius III in 1181
- Conrad of Wittelsbach (1120/1125–1200) (1165, 1181)

==== 13th century ====
- Ottaviano di Paoli (d. 1206) (1182, 1200)
- Pietro Gallocia (d. 1211) (1188, 1206)
- Nicola de Romanis (d. 1219) (1204, 1211)
- Ugolino dei Conti di Segni (1145–1241) (1198, 1219)
  Elected Pope Gregory IX in 1227
- Pelagio Galvani (d. 1230) (1206/1207, 1227)
- Jean Halgrin (1180–1237) (1227, 1230)
- Jacques de Vitry (1160/70–1240) (1228, 1237)
- Rinaldo Conti (1185–1261) (1227, 1240)
  Elected Pope Alexander IV in 1254
- Odo of Châteauroux (1190–1273) (1244, 1254)
- John of Toledo (d. 1275) (1244, 1273)
- João Pedro Julião (1210–1276) (1273, 1275)
  Elected Pope John XXI in 1276
- Bertrand de Saint-Martin (d. 1277) (1273, 1276)
- Ordonho Alvares (1198–1285) (1278, 1278)
- Bentivenga dei Bentivenghi (1230–1289) (1278, 1285)
- Latino Malabranca Orsini (d. 1294) (1278, 1289)
- Gerardo Bianchi (1220/1225–1302) (1278, 1294)

==== 14th century ====
- Giovanni Boccamazza (d. 1309) (1285, 1302)
- Leonardo Patrasso (1230–1311) (1300, 1309)
- Giovanni Minio de Murovalle (1250–1312) (1302, 1311)
- Nicolò Albertini (1250–1321) (1303, 1312)
- Berengar Fredol the Elder (1250–1323) (1305, 1321)
- Berengar Fredol the Younger (d. 1323) (1312, 1323)
- Guillaume Godin (1260–1336) (1312, 1323)
- Pierre Desprès (1288–1361) (1320, 1336)
- Élie de Talleyrand-Périgord (1301–1364) (1331, 1361)
- Guy de Boulogne (1313–1373) (1342, 1364)
- Ange de Grimoard (1315/20-1388) (1366, 1373, deposed by Urban VI in 1378, reappointed to the post in the obedience of Avignon until 1388)

=== During the Western Schism ===
The obedience of Rome (1378–1415)

- Tommaso da Frignano (1305–1381) (1378)
- Francesco Moricotti Prignano (d. 1394) (1378, 1381)
- Philippe d'Alençon (1338–1397) (1378, 1394)
- Pietro Pileo di Prata (1330–1400) (1378, 1397)
- Angelo Acciaioli (1349–1408) (1384, 1405)
- Enrico Minutoli (d. 1412) (1389, 1408)
- Antonio Correr (1369–1445) (1408, 1415)

The obedience of Avignon (1378–1429)

- Ange de Grimoard (until 1388)
- Pietro Corsini (1335–1405) (1370, 1388)
- Gui de Malsec (d. 1412) (1375, 1405, deposed 1409, retained the post in the obedience of Pisa)
- Jean Flandrin (after 1301–1415) (1390, 1405)
- Julián Lobera y Valtierra (d. 1435) (1423, 1429)

The obedience of Pisa (1409–1415)

- Gui de Malsec (until 1412)
- Jean Allarmet de Brogny (1342–1426) (1385, 1415)

=== After the Council of Constance ===
==== 15th century ====
- Angelo Correr (c. 1330–1417) (1415, 1415)
- Jean-Allarmet de Brogny (1342–1426) (1385, 1417)
- Baldassare Cossa (c. 1360/1370–1419) (1419, 1419)
- Jean Allarmet de Brogny (2nd term) (1342–1426) (1385, 1419)
- Angelo d'Anna de Sommariva (d. 1428) (1384, 1426)
- Giordano Orsini (1360/1370–1438) (1405, 1428)
- Antonio Correr (again) (1369–1445) (1408, 1438)
- Giovanni Berardi (1380–1449) (1439, 1445)
- Amédée de Savoie (1383–1451) (1449, 1449)
- Francesco Condulmer (1390–1453) (1431, 1451)
- Giorgio Fieschi (c. 1395–1461) (1439, 1453)
- Isidore of Kiev (1380/1390–1463) (1439, 1461)
- Basilios Bessarion (1403–1472) (1439, 1463)
- Guillaume d'Estouteville (1403–1483) (1439, 1472)
- Roderic de Borja (1431–1503) (1456, 1483)
  Elected Pope Alexander VI in 1492
- Oliviero Carafa (1430–1511) (1467, 1492)

==== 16th century ====
- Raffaele Riario (1461–1521) (1477, 1511)
- Bernardino Lopez de Carvajal (1456–1523) (1493, 1521)
- Francesco Soderini (1453–1524) (1503, 1523)
- Niccolò Fieschi (1456–1524) (1503, 1524)
- Alessandro Farnese (1468–1549) (1493, 1524)
  Elected Pope Paul III in 1534
- Giovanni Piccolomini (1475–1537) (1517, 1535)
- Giovanni Domenico de Cupis (1493–1553) (1517, 1537)
- Gian Pietro Carafa (1476–1559) (1536, 1553)
  Elected Pope Paul IV in 1555
- Jean du Bellay (1492–1560) (1535, 1555)
- François de Tournon (1489–1562) (1530, 1560)
- Rodolfo Pio de Carpi (1500–1564) (1536, 1562)
- Francesco Pisani (1494–1570) (1517, 1564)
- Giovanni Girolamo Morone (1509–1580) (1542, 1570)
- Alessandro Farnese, juniore (1520–1589) (1534, 1580)
- Giovanni Antonio Serbelloni (1519–1591) (1560, 1589)
- Alfonso Gesualdo (1540–1603) (1561, 1591)

==== 17th century ====
- Tolomeo Gallio (1526–1607) (1565, 1603)
- Domenico Pinelli (1541–1611) (1585, 1607)
- Francois de Joyeuse (1562–1615) (1583, 1611)
- Antonio Maria Galli (1553–1620) (1586, 1615)
- Antonio Maria Sauli (1541–1623) (1587, 1620)
- Francesco Maria del Monte (1549–1626) (1588, 1623)
- Ottavio Bandini (1558–1629) (1596, 1626)
- Giovanni Battista Deti (1576–1630) (1599, 1629)
- Domenico Ginnasi (1550–1639) (1604, 1630)
- Carlo Emmanuele Pio de Savoia, seniore (1585–1641) (1604, 1639)
- Marcello Lante della Rovere (1561–1652) (1606, 1641)
- Giulio Roma (1584–1652) (1621, 1652) served less than 5 months
- Carlo de' Medici (1595–1666) (1615, 1652)
- Francesco Barberini, seniore (1597–1679) (1623, 1666)
- Cesare Facchinetti (1608–1683) (1643, 1680)
- Niccolò Albergati-Ludovisi (1608–1687) (1645, 1683)
- Alderano Cybo (1613–1700) (1645, 1687)

==== 18th century ====
Image	Name of incumbent	Life dates		Cardinalate	Deanship	Notes
Image	Name of incumbent	Birth	Death and age	Cardinalate	Deanship	Notes
	Emmanuel–Theodose de Bouillon	24 August 1643	2 March 1715 (aged 71)	5 August 1669 by Pope Clement IX	15 December 1700 – 2 March 1715 (14 years, 77 days)	Died in office
	Nicolò Acciaioli	6 July 1630	23 February 1719 (aged 88)	29 November 1669 by Pope Clement IX	18 March 1715 – 23 February 1719 (3 years, 342 days)	Died in office
	Fulvio Astalli	29 July 1655	14 January 1721 (aged 65)	2 September 1686 by Pope Innocent XI	26 April 1719 – 14 January 1721 (1 year, 263 days)	Died in office
	Sebastiano Antonio Tanara	10 April 1650	5 May 1724 (aged 74)	21 May 1696 by Pope Innocent XII	3 March 1721 – 5 May 1724 (3 years, 63 days)	Died in office
	Francesco del Giudice	7 December 1647	10 October 1725 (aged 77)	13 February 1690 by Pope Alexander VIII	12 June 1724 – 10 October 1725 (1 year, 120 days)	Died in office
	Fabrizio Paolucci	2 April 1651	12 June 1726 (aged 75)	19 December 1698 by Pope Innocent XII	19 November 1725 – 12 June 1726 (205 days)	Died in office
	Francesco Pignatelli	6 February 1652	15 December 1734 (aged 82)	17 December 1703 by Pope Clement XI	12 June 1726 – 15 December 1734 (8 years, 156 days)	Died in office. Declined to become Cardinal-Bishop of Ostia, as was traditionally held by the dean.
	Francesco Barberini	12 November 1662	17 August 1738 (aged 75)	13 November 1690 by Pope Alexander VIII	15 December 1734 – 17 August 1738 (3 years, 246 days)	Died in office
	Pietro Ottoboni	2 July 1667	23 February 1740 (aged 72)	7 November 1689 by Pope Alexander VIII	3 September 1738 – 23 February 1740 (1 year, 173 days)	Died in office
	Tommaso Ruffo	15 September 1663	16 February 1753 (aged 89)	17 May 1706 by Pope Clement XI	29 August 1740 – 16 February 1753 (12 years, 171 days)	Died in office
	Pier Luigi Carafa	4 July 1677	15 December 1755 (aged 78)	20 September 1728 by Pope Benedict XIII	9 April 1753 – 15 December 1755 (2 years, 250 days)	Died in office
	Rainiero d'Elci	7 March 1670	22 July 1761 (aged 91)	20 December 1737 by Pope Clement XII	12 January 1756 – 22 June 1761 (5 years, 191 days)	Died in office
	Giuseppe Spinelli	1 February 1694	12 April 1763 (aged 69)	17 January 1735 by Pope Clement XII	17 July 1761 – 12 April 1763 (1 year, 269 days)	Died in office
	Carlo Alberto Guidoboni Cavalchini	26 July 1683	7 March 1774 (aged 90)	9 September 1743 by Pope Benedict XIV	16 May 1763 – 7 March 1774 (10 years, 295 days)	Died in office
	Gian Francesco Albani	26 February 1720	15 September 1803 (aged 83)	10 April 1747 by Pope Benedict XIV	18 December 1775 – 15 September 1803 (27 years, 271 days)	Died in office. Longest deanship.

==== 19th century ====
Image	Name of incumbent	Life dates		Cardinalate	Deanship	Notes
Image	Name of incumbent	Birth	Death and age	Cardinalate	Deanship	Notes
	Henry Benedict Stuart	6 March 1725	13 July 1807 (aged 82)	3 July 1747 by Pope Benedict XIV	26 September 1803 – 13 July 1807 (3 years, 290 days)	Died in office. Longest total cardinalate
	Leonardo Antonelli	6 November 1730	23 January 1811 (aged 80)	24 April 1775 by Pope Pius VI	3 August 1807 – 23 January 1811 (3 years, 173 days)	Died in office
	Alessandro Mattei	20 February 1744	20 April 1820 (aged 76)	12 July 1779 by Pope Pius VI	26 September 1814 – 20 April 1820 (5 years, 207 days)	Died in office. Vacancy caused by his exile by Napoleon.
	Giulio Maria della Somaglia	29 July 1744	2 April 1830 (aged 85)	1 June 1795 by Pope Pius VII	29 May 1820 – 2 April 1830 (9 years, 308 days)	Died in office
	Bartolomeo Pacca	27 December 1756	19 April 1844 (aged 87)	23 February 1801 by Pope Pius VII	5 July 1830 – 19 April 1844 (13 years, 289 days)	Died in office
	Ludovico Micara	12 October 1775	24 May 1847 (aged 71)	20 December 1824 by Pope Leo XII	17 June 1844 – 24 May 1847 (2 years, 341 days)	Died in office
	Vincenzo Macchi	30 August 1770	30 September 1860 (aged 90)	2 October 1826 by Pope Leo XII	11 June 1847 – 30 September 1860 (3 years, 319 days)	Died in office
	Mario Mattei	6 September 1792	7 October 1870 (aged 78)	2 July 1832 by Pope Gregory XVI	30 September 1860 – 7 October 1870 (9 years, 305 days)	Died in office
	Costantino Patrizi Naro	4 September 1798	17 December 1876 (aged 78)	23 June 1834 by Pope Gregory XVI	8 October 1870 – 17 December 1876 (6 years, 70 days)	Died in office
	Luigi Amat di San Filippo e Sorso	20 June 1796	30 March 1878 (aged 81)	19 May 1837 by Pope Gregory XVI	12 March 1877 – 30 March 1878 (9 years, 177 days)	Died in office
	Camillo di Pietro	10 January 1806	6 March 1884 (aged 78)	19 December 1853 by Pope Pius IX	15 July 1878 – 6 March 1884 (5 years, 235 days)	Died in office
	Carlo Sacconi	9 May 1808	25 February 1889 (aged 80)	27 September 1861 by Pope Pius IX	24 March 1884 – 25 February 1889 (4 years, 338 days)	Died in office
	Raffaele Monaco La Valletta	23 February 1827	14 July 1896 (aged 69)	13 March 1868 by Pope Pius IX	24 May 1889 – 14 July 1896 (7 years, 51 days)	Died in office
	Luigi Oreglia di Santo Stefano	9 July 1828	7 December 1913 (aged 85)	22 December 1873 by Pope Pius IX	30 November 1896 – 7 December 1913 (17 years, 7 days)	Died in office

==== 20th century ====
Image	Name of incumbent	Life dates		Cardinalate	Deanship	Notes
Image	Name of incumbent	Birth	Death and age	Cardinalate	Deanship	Notes
	Serafino Vannutelli	26 November 1834	19 August 1915 (aged 80)	14 March 1887 by Pope Leo XIII	7 December 1913 – 19 August 1915 (1 year, 255 days)	Died in office
	Vincenzo Vannutelli	5 December 1836	9 July 1930 (aged 93)	30 December 1889 by Pope Leo XIII	6 December 1915 – 9 July 1930 (14 years, 215 days)	Died in office
	Gennaro di Belmonte	10 April 1851	16 February 1948 (aged 96)	27 November 1911 by Pope Pius X	9 July 1930 – 16 February 1948 (17 years, 222 days)	Died in office
	Francesco Selvaggiani	1 October 1871	13 January 1951 (aged 79)	30 June 1930 by Pope Pius XI	21 June 1948 – 13 January 1951 (2 years, 206 days)	Died in office
	Eugène Tisserant	24 March 1884	21 February 1972 (aged 87)	15 June 1936 by Pope Pius XI	13 January 1951 – 21 February 1972 (21 years, 39 days)	Died in office
	Amleto Giovanni Cicognani	24 February 1883	17 December 1973 (aged 90)	15 December 1958 by Pope John XXIII	24 March 1972 – 17 December 1973 (1 year, 268 days)	Died in office
	Luigi Traglia	3 April 1895	22 November 1977 (aged 82)	28 March 1960 by Pope John XXIII	7 January 1974 – 22 November 1977 (3 years, 319 days)	Died in office
	Carlo Confalonieri	25 July 1893	1 August 1986 (aged 93)	15 December 1958 by Pope John XXIII	12 December 1977 – 1 August 1986 (8 years, 232 days)	Died in office
	Agnelo Rossi	4 May 1913	21 May 1995 (aged 82)	22 February 1965 by Pope Paul VI	19 December 1986 – 31 May 1993 (6 years, 163 days)	Retired in 1993
	Bernardin Gantin	8 May 1922	13 May 2008 (aged 86)	27 June 1977 by Pope Paul VI	5 June 1993 – 29 November 2002 (9 years, 177 days)	Retired in 2002

==== 21st century ====
Image	Name of incumbent	Life dates		Cardinalate	Deanship	Notes
Image	Name of incumbent	Birth	Death and age	Cardinalate	Deanship	Notes
	Joseph Ratzinger	16 April 1927	31 December 2022 (aged 95)	27 June 1977 by Pope Paul VI	30 November 2002 – 19 April 2005 (2 years, 147 days)	Elected Pope Benedict XVI in 2005, Retired in 2013 as pope
	Angelo Sodano	23 November 1927	27 May 2022 (aged 94)	28 June 1991 by Pope John Paul II	30 April 2005 – 21 December 2019 (14 years, 235 days)	Retired in 2019
	Giovanni Battista Re	30 January 1934 (age 92)		21 February 2001 by Pope John Paul II	18 January 2020 – 9 October 2026 (6 years, 264 days)	Elected to a five-year term, renewable once, retired in 2026
	Luis Antonio Tagle	21 June 1957 (age 69)		24 November 2012 by Pope Benedict XVI	8 October 2026 (2 days)	
