= Ludovico Donato =

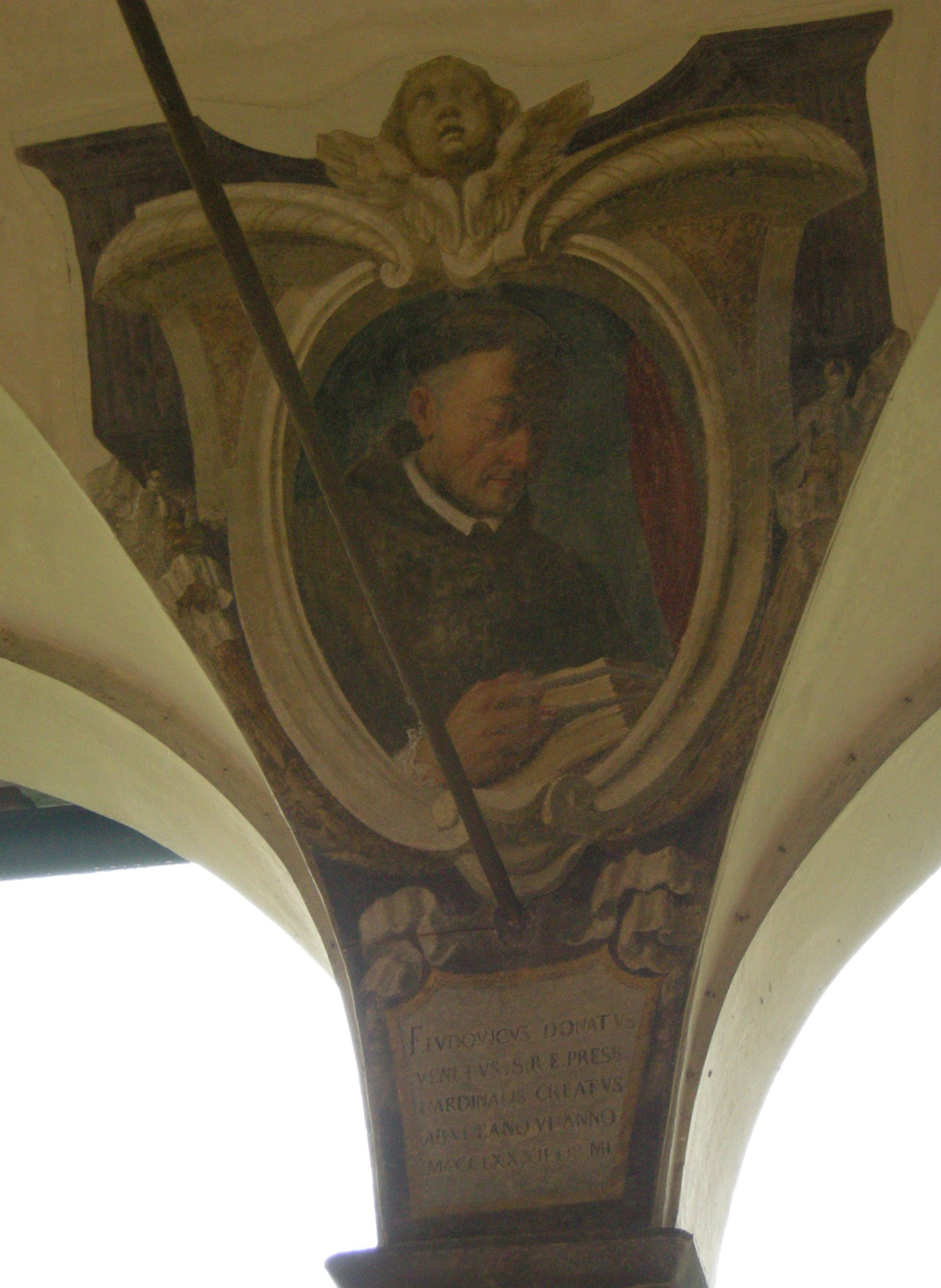
Ludovico Donati

Ludovico Donato (died 1385 or 1386) was an Italian Franciscan. He became Minister General of his order, of the Rome obedience during the Western Schism, in 1379. In 1383 he was created a Cardinal, the first ever from Venice.

He was arrested with four other cardinals in 1385 (Gentile di Sangro, Adam Easton, Bartolomeo da Cogorno, and Marino Giudice), suspected of conspiring against Pope Urban VI. They were imprisoned and tortured. Donato is believed to have been executed around January 1386.
