= Thomas of Frignano =

Italian Franciscan theologian

Thomas of Frignano OFM
- Cardinal-Bishop of Frascati
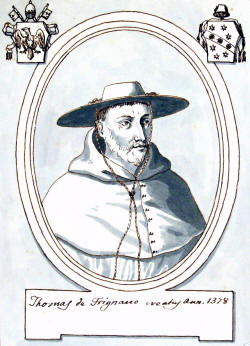
- Native name: Tommaso da Frignano
- Church: Catholic Church
- Diocese: Suburbicarian Diocese of Frascati
- In office: 30 May 1380 – 19 November 1381
- Predecessor: Gilles Aycelin de Montaigu
- Successor: Guillaume de Chanac
- Other posts: Cardinal-Priest of Santi Nereo e Achilleo (1378-1381); Administrator of Grado (1378-1381); Patriarch of Grado (1372-1378); Minister General of the Franciscans (1367-1372)

Orders
- Created cardinal: 18 September 1378 by Pope Urban VI

Personal details
- Born: 1305 Modena, Kingdom of Italy, Holy Roman Empire
- Died: 19 November 1381 (aged 75–76) Rome, Papal States
- Coat of arms

Thomas of Frignano (1305–1381) was an Italian Franciscan theologian. He became Minister General of the Order of Friars Minor, and on 19 July 1372 was approved by Pope Gregory XI as patriarch of Grado.

Tommaso was created a cardinal on 20 September 1378 by Pope Urban VI. He was Bishop of Frascati and, as the senior bishop in Urban's new college, probably Dean of the Sacred College of Cardinals from December 1378. He died in Rome on 19 November 1381.

== Notes ==
Catholic Church titles
| Preceded by Marcus of Viterbo | Minister General of the Order of Friars Minor; 1363–1373 | Succeeded by Leonardo Rossi |
