= Dietrich of Nieheim =

Dietrich of Nieheim (Niem or Nyem) (c. 1345 – 22 March 1418) was a medieval German historian.

== Life ==
Dietritch was born at Nieheim, a small town subject to the see of Paderborn. Nothing is known about his family, and but little about his life previous to his entry into the service of the papal Curia. He spent some time in Italy in the study of law, but never obtained the degree of Doctor. He became a notary of the papal court of the rota at Avignon, to keep which he had to take orders, if he had not already done so. When Pope Gregory XI returned to Rome in 1377, Dietrich accompanied him.

Urban VI here took particular notice of him, made him an abbreviator to the papal chancery, and in 1383 took him with him in his visit to Charles III of Naples at Naples, an expedition which led to many unpleasant adventures, from which he escaped in 1385 by leaving the Curia. In 1387 he is again found among the abbreviators, and in 1395 Pope Boniface IX appointed him to the Prince-Bishopric of Verden. His attempt to take possession of the see, however, met with successful opposition. About Easter, 1401, Dietrich was at Erfurt in Germany, where he matriculated at the university.

Towards the end of the fourteenth century Johann Peters of Dordrecht had founded at Rome a hospital for German pilgrims, known as Santa Maria dell' Anima, still in existence and united with the German national church at Rome. Dietrich was an energetic promoter of the new foundation, to such an extent that after Peters he deserves to be considered its chief founder.

He had to resume his work in the chancery, where his name again appears in 1403. Dietrich had begun to write a chronicle, of which only fragments are extant. His chief importance, however, lies in the part he took in the controversies arising out of the Great Schism. He accompanied Gregory XII to Lucca in May 1408. He took no part in the Council of Pisa itself, being then in Germany, but he adhered to the pope elected by the council of Pisa (Alexander V) and to his successor, Antipope Pope John XXIII resuming his place at the Curia. In view of the increasing confusion in the Church, however, he became one of the most ardent advocates of the appeal to a general council. He was present at the council of Constance as adviser to the German "nation." He died at Maastricht on 22 March 1418.

Dietrich wrote about events in which he either had an intimate personal share or of which he was in an excellent position to obtain accurate information. His most important works are the Nemus unionis and the De schismate. Of these the first, compiled at Lucca after the breach with Gregory XII, is a collection of documents which had fallen into his hands during the negotiations for union: papal pronouncements, pamphlets, letters written and received by himself, and the like.

The De schismate libri III, completed on 25 May 1410, describes the history of events since 1376 as he had seen them. It was continued in the Historia de vita Johannis XXIII. The abundance of its materials makes this work one of the most important authorities for the last stages of the schism. His judgments, however, concerning persons and facts must be taken with caution, Dietrich being strongly partisan.

== Works ==
Other works are:

- De bono regimine Rom. pontificis, dedicated to the new [anti-]pope (John XXIII)
- De modis uniendiae reformandi ecclesiam and De difficultate reformationis in concilia universali, advocating the convocation of a council, to which the pope is to bow
- Contra dampnatos Wiclivitas Pragae, against the Hussites
- Jura ad privilegia imperil, a glorification of the empire in view of the convocation of the council of Constance
- Avisamenta pelcherrima de unions et reformatione membrorum et capitis fienda, a programme of church reform based on his experiences of the evils of the papal system.
- De shismate libri III, A.D. 1411 "When the existence of the Church is threatened, she is released from the commandments of morality. With unity as the end, the use of every means is sanctified, even cunning, treachery, violence, simony, prison, death. For all order is for the sake of the community, and the individual must be sacrificed to the common good."

== Appearances in fiction ==
A passage from Dietrich of Nieheim's De schismate libri III is used as an epigraph at the beginning of the second chapter of Arthur Koestler's novel, Darkness at Noon:

When the existence of the Church is threatened, she is released from the commandments of morality. With unity as the end, the use of every means is sanctified, even deceit, treachery, violence, usury, prison, and death. Because order serves the good of the community, the individual must be sacrificed for the common good.

However, this is actually a paraphrase of Dietrich's position in the treatise De modis, as expressed by the German historian Ludwig von Pastor, in his book Geschichte der Päpste seit dem Ausgang des Mittelalters (History of the Popes from the Close of the Middle Ages), vol. 1, p. 149. De modis is credited in German editions of Darkness at Noon, but von Pastor is not. The paraphrase is about how Dietrich wanted the Holy Roman Emperor to call a General Council, the Pope to bow to the will of Emperor and Council, and for Emperor and Council to do whatever they felt necessary to end the antipope schism.

Here is the actual quote from De Modis, from the section 'De modis, loco trium malorum Pontificum, unum bonum eligendi, in Universalis Concilio Constantienst':

Therefore, pay attention, o faithful. For obeying such quarrelers, and supporting those dividing the Church, we see as sinning most gravely and mortally -- dividing, I say, the Body of Christ among their wickednesses and sins. For I believe you have been freed from these tyrannical lordships already, if your obedience were not cherished.

But if these two or three [popes and antipopes] will not concede voluntarily, it remains to proceed to stronger remedies. That is, overthrowing them and segregating them from the community of the Church, and, as I said before, taking away obedience from them.

Then, if the Church will not be able to accomplish it in this way, then by way of deceit, fraud, arms, violence, power, promises, gifts and money, and finally, prison and death, it is appropriate to procure in any way whatever the most holy union and conjoining of the Church.

Close to what was said by Tullius Cicero in De Officiis [III v 23]: 'This is what the laws look for, this is what they will: [the city] to be conjoined safely. So those who break the laws are punished by death, exile, chains, and fines.'

Dietrich of Nieheim Born: ca. 1345 in Nieheim Died: 22 March 1418 in Maastricht
Catholic Church titles
Regnal titles
Preceded by Otto of Brunswick and Lunenburg (Wolfenbüttel)	Prince-Bishop of Verden; 1395–1398/1401 (de facto/de jure)	Succeeded by Conrad of Vechta
