= Rinaldo Brancaccio =

Italian cardinal

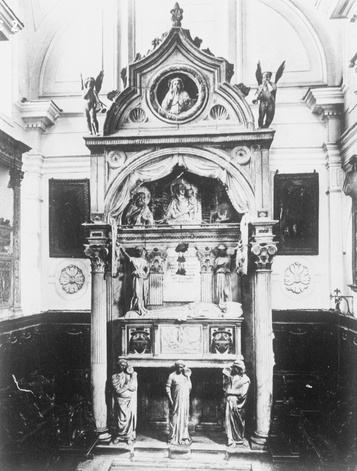
Cardinal Brancaccio's tomb in the church of Sant'Angelo a Seggio del Nilo, Naples

Rinaldo Brancaccio (died 27 March 1427) was an Italian cardinal from the 14th and 15th century, during the Western Schism. Other members of his family were also created cardinals: Landolfo Brancaccio (1294); Niccolò Brancaccio, pseudocardinal of Antipope Clement VII (1378); Ludovico Bonito (1408); Tommaso Brancaccio (1411); Francesco Maria Brancaccio (1633) and Stefano Brancaccio (1681). He was called the Cardinal Brancaccio.

== Biography ==
Brancaccio was born in Naples. There is no information about his education. He has been abbot and papal acolyte.

Pope Urban VI created him cardinal deacon in the consistory of 17 December 1384 with the deaconry of Ss. Vito e Modesto. During his long-lasting cardinalate participated in the papal conclave of 1389, then in the conclave of 1404 and of 1406. Pope Gregory XII named him commendatario of the titulus Santa Maria in Trastevere in 1408. He switched his obedience and participated in the Council of Pisa and in the following papal conclave of 1409.

He became cardinal protodeacon in 1409 or 1410. He also took part in the conclave of 1410 in Bologna of the Pisa obedience and crowned Antipope John XXIII, who named him governor of the province of Campagna e Marittima, with the title of papal vicar. Later he was made legate in Naples. He was administrator of the metropolitan see of Palermo from 1410 to 1414 and was administrator of the metropolitan see of Taranto from 1412 to 1420. He attended the Council of Constance. He also participated in the conclave of 1417, which elected Pope Martin V, whom he crowned, and was the one who closed that council.

He was named administrator of the see of Aversa in 1418 until his death. He died on 27 March 1427 in Rome. His remains were transferred to Naples and buried in a funeral monument, the work of Donatello, Michelozzo di Bartolommeo and Pagno di Lapo, in the church of Sant'Angelo a Seggio del Nilo, which he had built as well as the adjacent hospital.
