= Jean-Allarmet de Brogny =

French Cardinal (1342-1426)

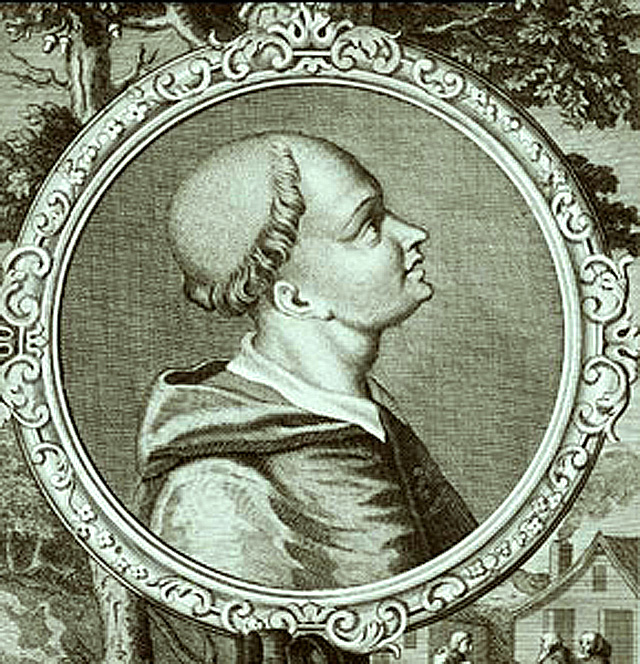
Jean-Allarmet de Brogny

Jean-Allarmet de Brogny (1342 – 16 February 1426) was a French Cardinal who presided over the Council of Constance.

== Biography ==
He was born in the hamlet of Brogny, now part of Annecy-le-Vieux in Savoy.

Biographers are not agreed as to his parentage and real name. According to some, he belonged to a peasant family of Brogny, called Allarmet; others say he was descended from the d'Alouzier, a noble house in Comtat Venaissin. It is certain, however, that the future cardinal was a swineherd, when two monks, struck by his open disposition and thoughtful answers, took him with them to Geneva, and procured for him an education which was completed at the University of Avignon. Despite the friendship and the inducement of Guillaume de Marcossey, Bishop of Geneva, young Allarmet retired to the Dijon Charterhouse, where his merits soon became widely known. When Robert of Geneva was elected pope by the faction hostile to Pope Urban VI, Allarmet joined him at Avignon, either having been sent by the Duke of Burgundy or called by Robert himself.

At Avignon favors were bestowed upon him in quick succession by the Avignon Pope Clement VII: the Bishopric of Viviers, in 1382, the dignity of Cardinal of Sant'Anastasia, in 1385, and in 1391 the exalted office of Chancellor of the Holy See. Robert's successor, Peter of Luna, who called himself Benedict XIII, sanctioned all these preferments and even promoted Allarmet from Viviers to Bishop of Ostia-Velletri, one of the suburbicarian dioceses, in 1405. There is no doubt that at that time Cardinal de Brogny, like Peter of Luxemburg and Vincent Ferrer, considered the French obedience as legitimate. However, as early as 1398, he had left Avignon. The elusive tactics of Gregory XII and Benedict XIII were met by him with more than a silent protest. He inaugurated the neutral party and brought about the Council of Pisa which resulted in the election of Pope Alexander V (1409).

The new pope confirmed de Brogny in his double dignity of Bishop of Ostia and Chancellor of the Church. In the latter capacity he presided over Alexander's funeral and also over the conclave which elected Antipope John XXIII (1410). John held de Brogny in the highest esteem.

The Metropolitan See of Arles having become vacant, he disregarded the candidate elected by the Arlesian chapter and in 1410 appointed Cardinal de Brogny perpetual administrator of that see. This appointment was intended as a means of recovering the rights of the Church of Arles usurped by the Counts of Provence during the confusion consequent on the schism. The new metropolitan did not disappoint his patron. With the might of right he fought the usurpers till the last claim of the venerable see was secured. Cardinal de Brogny then left his diocese in care of the two Fabri and proceeded on a still more delicate mission. Owing to the obstinacy of the contestants, the Council of Pisa had really left the Church with three popes instead of one. Moreover, John Hus was adding the issue of heresy. The Council of Constance was convened to meet this double difficulty, and after the withdrawal of John XXIII, de Brogny, in virtue of his title of Chancellor, presided over the sessions of the Council.

For unity, he voted for the deposition of the three popes, two of whom had been his personal friends. According to the Catholic Encyclopedia, he could have secured the election for himself, had he so desired; but he threw the weight of his influence in favor of Colonna, who took the name of Pope Martin V.

He died at Rome in 1426. In his old age de Brogny asked to be translated from Ostia to Geneva, but only his remains reached the beloved place of his youth; they were laid to rest in the chapel of the Maccabees which had been added to the old cathedral by the cardinal himself.

De Brogny is variously known in history as Cardinal of Viviers, Cardinal of Ostia, sometimes Cardinal of Arles, and Cardinal de Saluces. He founded the Dominican convents of Tivoli and Annecy; the maladrerie or lepers' hospital, of Brogny; part of the Celestines' monastery of Avignon; and the College of St. Nicholas, affiliated to the University of Avignon, and endowed with twenty scholarships for destitute students. Soulavie, president of St. Nicholas College, published (1774) a Histoire de Jean d'Alouzier de Brogny of which only fifty copies were printed.

Catholic Church titles
Preceded by Angelo Acciaioli II	Cardinal-bishop of Ostia; 1415–1426	Succeeded by Julian Lobera y Valtierra
Preceded by Artaud de Mélan	Archbishop of Arles; 1410–1423	Succeeded by Louis Aleman
Preceded by Bernard d'Aigrefeuille	Bishop of Viviers; 1383–1385	Succeeded by Olivier de Poitiers
