= Francesco Moricotti Prignani =

Italian bishop and Cardinal

Francesco Moricotti Prignani (Prignano) (died 1394) was an Italian bishop and Cardinal. A cardinal-nephew, he was created Cardinal in 1378 by his uncle Pope Urban VI.

He was Archbishop of Pisa from 1362. He was named Bishop of Palestrina in 1380 and became Dean of the Sacred College of Cardinals in 1381. Regent of the Apostolic Chancery 1382-85 and Vice-Chancellor of the Holy Roman Church from October 1385 until his death. He presided over the Papal conclave, 1389 and consecrated new Pope Boniface IX bishop of Rome.
