= Banneret (Rome) =

A Banneret was the name of an officer or magistrate of Rome towards the close of the 14th century. The people of Rome, and throughout the territory of the church, during the disputes of the antipopes, had formed a kind of republican government; where the whole power was lodged in the hands of a magistrate called Senator, and twelve heads of quarters called Bannerets, by reason of the banners which each raised in his district.

By the end of the 14th century the Conservators, had succeeded the Bannerets, and were set in a fair way to become the effective representatives of the people.

== See also ==
- Palace of the Conservators
- Senatorial Palace
- War of the Eight Saints (1375–1378), a war between Pope Gregory XI and a coalition of Italian city-states led by Florence, which contributed to the end of the Avignon Papacy.
