= Enrico Minutoli =

Italian cardinal (died 1412)

Enrico Minutoli (died 1412) was an Italian cardinal.

He was bishop of Bitonto from 1382 to 1389 and then archbishop of Naples. He was also archpriest of the Liberian Basilica (1396) and Camerlengo of the Holy Roman Church (1406). He is buried in the Cappella Minutolo, Naples, with other members of the Minutoli family. He commissioned some of the work on the Naples Duomo, and had the Palazzo Arcivescovile built.
