= Pope Boniface IX =

Head of the Catholic Church from 1389 to 1404

- Bishop of Rome
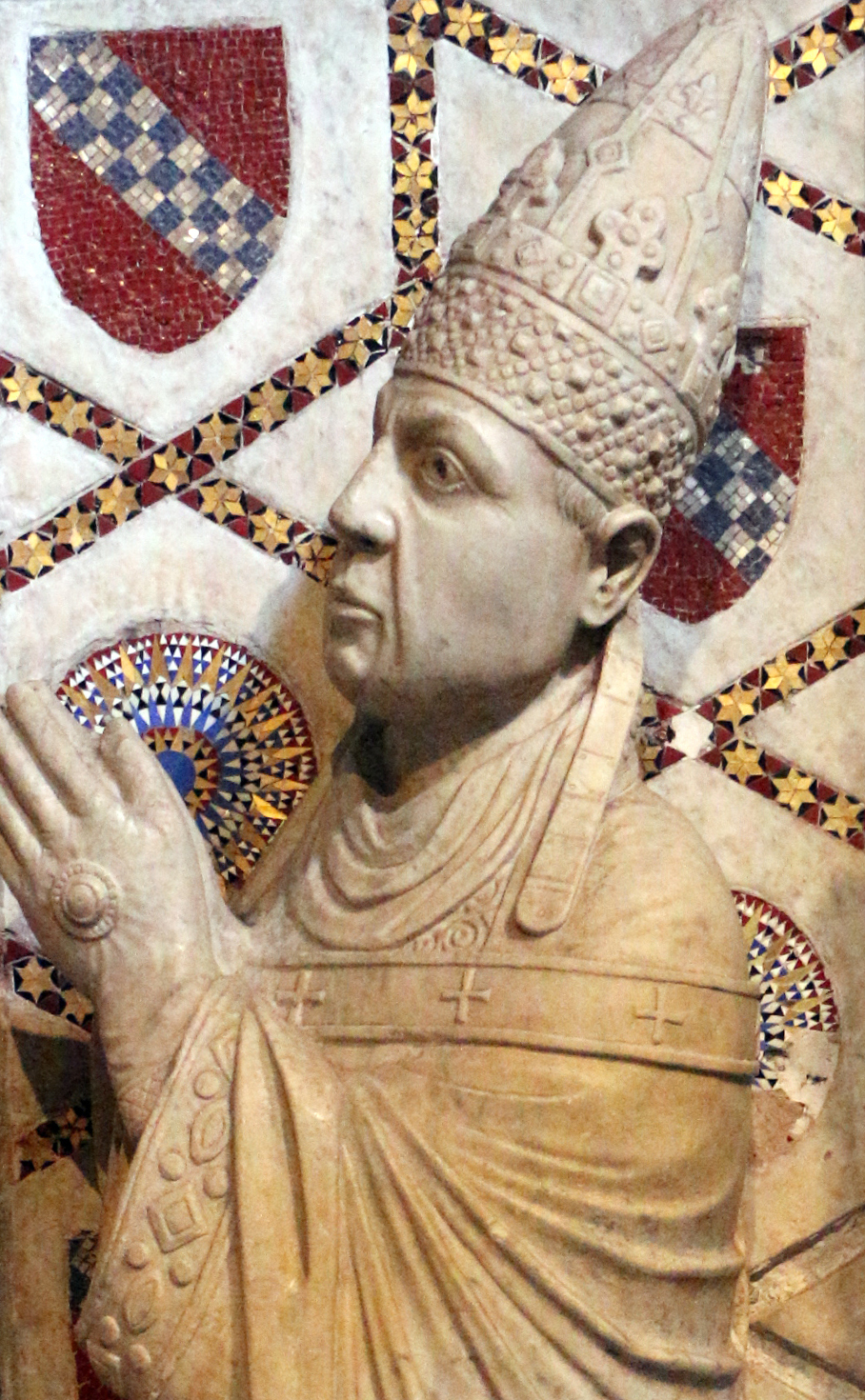
- Bust c. 1400
- Church: Catholic Church
- Papacy began: 2 November 1389
- Papacy ended: 1 October 1404
- Predecessor: Urban VI
- Successor: Innocent VII
- Opposed to: Avignon claimants: Clement VII; Benedict XIII
- Previous posts: Cardinal-Deacon of San Giorgio in Velabro (1381–1385); Cardinal-Priest of Santa Anastasia (1385–1389); Archpriest of the Lateran Basilica (1388–1389)

Orders
- Consecration: 9 November 1389 by Francesco Moricotti Prignani
- Created cardinal: 21 December 1381 by Urban VI

Personal details
- Born: Pietro Tomacelli Cybo c. 1350 Naples, Kingdom of Naples
- Died: 1 October 1404 (aged 53–54) Rome, Papal States
- Coat of arms

Papal styles of Pope Boniface IX
- Reference style: His Holiness
- Spoken style: Your Holiness
- Religious style: Holy Father
- Posthumous style: None

Pope Boniface IX (Latin: Bonifatius IX; Italian: Bonifacio IX; c. 1350 – 1 October 1404, born Pietro Tomacelli Cybo) was head of the Catholic Church from 2 November 1389 to his death, in October 1404. He was the second Roman pope during the Western Schism. In this time, the Avignon claimants, Clement VII and Benedict XIII, maintained the Roman Curia in Avignon, under the protection of the French monarchy. He is the last pope to date to take on the pontifical name "Boniface".

== Early life ==
Born c. 1350 in Naples, Pietro (also Piero or Perino) Tomacelli Cybo was son of Baron Giacomo Tomacelli and Verdella Caracciolo, feudataries of Casarano and nearby Casaranello, from noble neapolitan families, and a descendant of Tamaso Cybo, who belonged to an influential noble family from Genoa and settled in Casarano in the Kingdom of Naples. He was baptized in the paleochristian church of Santa Maria della Croce (the church of Casaranello). An unsympathetic German contemporary source, Dietrich of Nieheim, asserted that he was illiterate (nesciens scribere etiam male cantabat). Neither a trained theologian nor skilled in the business of the Curia, he was tactful and prudent in a difficult era, but Ludwig Pastor, who passes swiftly over his pontificate, says, "The numerous endeavours for unity made during this period form one of the saddest chapters in the history of the Church. Neither pope had the magnanimity to put an end to the terrible state of affairs" by resigning. After his election at the papal conclave of 1389, Germany, England, Hungary, Poland, and the greater part of Italy accepted him as pope. The remainder of Europe recognized the Avignon Pope Clement VII. He and Boniface mutually excommunicated each other.

The day before Tomacelli's election by the fourteen cardinals who remained faithful to the papacy at Rome, Clement VII at Avignon had just crowned a French prince, Louis II of Anjou, as king of Naples. The youthful Ladislaus was the son of King Charles III of Naples, assassinated in 1386, and Margaret of Durazzo, scion of a line that had traditionally supported the popes in their struggles in Rome with the anti-papal party in the city itself. Boniface IX saw to it that Ladislaus was crowned King of Naples at Gaeta on 29 May 1390 and worked with him for the next decade to expel the Angevin forces from southern Italy.

== Pontificate ==
Map showing support for Avignon (red) and Rome (blue) during the Western Schism

During his reign, Boniface IX finally extinguished the troublesome independence of the commune of Rome and established temporal control, though it required fortifying not only the Castel Sant'Angelo, but the bridges also, and for long seasons he was forced to live in more peaceful surroundings at Assisi or Perugia. He also took over the port of Ostia from its Cardinal Bishop. In the Papal States, Boniface IX gradually regained control of the chief castles and cities, and he re-founded the States as they would appear during the fifteenth century.

The antipope Clement VII died at Avignon on 16 September 1394, but the French cardinals quickly elected a successor on 28 September: Cardinal Pedro de Luna, who took the name Benedict XIII. Over the next few years, Boniface IX was entreated to abdicate, even by his strongest supporters: King Richard II of England (in 1396), the Diet of Frankfurt (in 1397), and King Wenceslaus of Germany (at Reims, 1398). He refused. Pressure for an ecumenical council also grew as the only way to breach the Western Schism, but the conciliar movement made no headway during Boniface's papacy.

During the reign of Boniface IX two jubilees were celebrated at Rome. The first, in 1390, had been declared by his predecessor, Urban VI, and was largely frequented by people from Germany, Hungary, Poland, Bohemia, and England. Several cities of Germany obtained the "privileges of the jubilee", as indulgences were called, but the preaching of indulgences led to abuses and scandal. The jubilee of 1400 drew to Rome great crowds of pilgrims, particularly from France, in spite of a disastrous plague. Pope Boniface IX remained in the city nonetheless.

In the latter part of 1399 there arose bands of flagellants, known as the Bianchi, or Albati ("White Penitents"), especially in Provence, where the Albigenses had been exterminated less than a century before. Their numbers spread to Spain and northern Italy. These evoked uneasy memories of the mass processions of wandering flagellants of the Black Death period, 1348–1349. They went in procession from city to city, clad in white garments, with faces hooded, and wearing on their backs a red cross, following a leader who carried a large cross. Rumors of imminent divine judgement and visions of the Virgin Mary abounded. They sang the newly popular hymn Stabat Mater during their processions. For a while, as the White Penitents approached Rome, gaining adherents along the way, Boniface IX and the Curia supported their penitential enthusiasm, but when they reached Rome, Boniface IX had their leader burnt at the stake, and they soon dispersed. "Boniface IX gradually discountenanced these wandering crowds, an easy prey of agitators and conspirators, and finally dissolved them", as the Catholic Encyclopedia reports.

In England, the anti-papal preaching of John Wyclif supported the opposition of the king and the higher clergy to Boniface IX's habit of granting English benefices as they fell vacant to favorites in the Roman Curia. Boniface IX introduced a revenue known as annates perpetuæ, withholding half the first year's income of every benefice granted in the Roman Court. The pope's agents also now sold not simply a vacant benefice but the expectation of one; and when an expectation had been sold, if another offered a larger sum for it, the pope voided the first sale. The unsympathetic observer Dietrich von Nieheim reports that he saw the same benefice sold several times in one week, and that the Pope talked business with his secretaries during Mass. There was resistance in England, the staunchest supporter of the Roman papacy during the Schism: the English Parliament confirmed and extended the statutes of Provisors and Praemunire of Edward III, giving the king veto power over papal appointments in England. Boniface IX was defeated in the face of a unified front, and the long controversy was finally settled to the English king's satisfaction. Nevertheless, at the Synod of London (1396), the English bishops convened to condemn Wyclif.

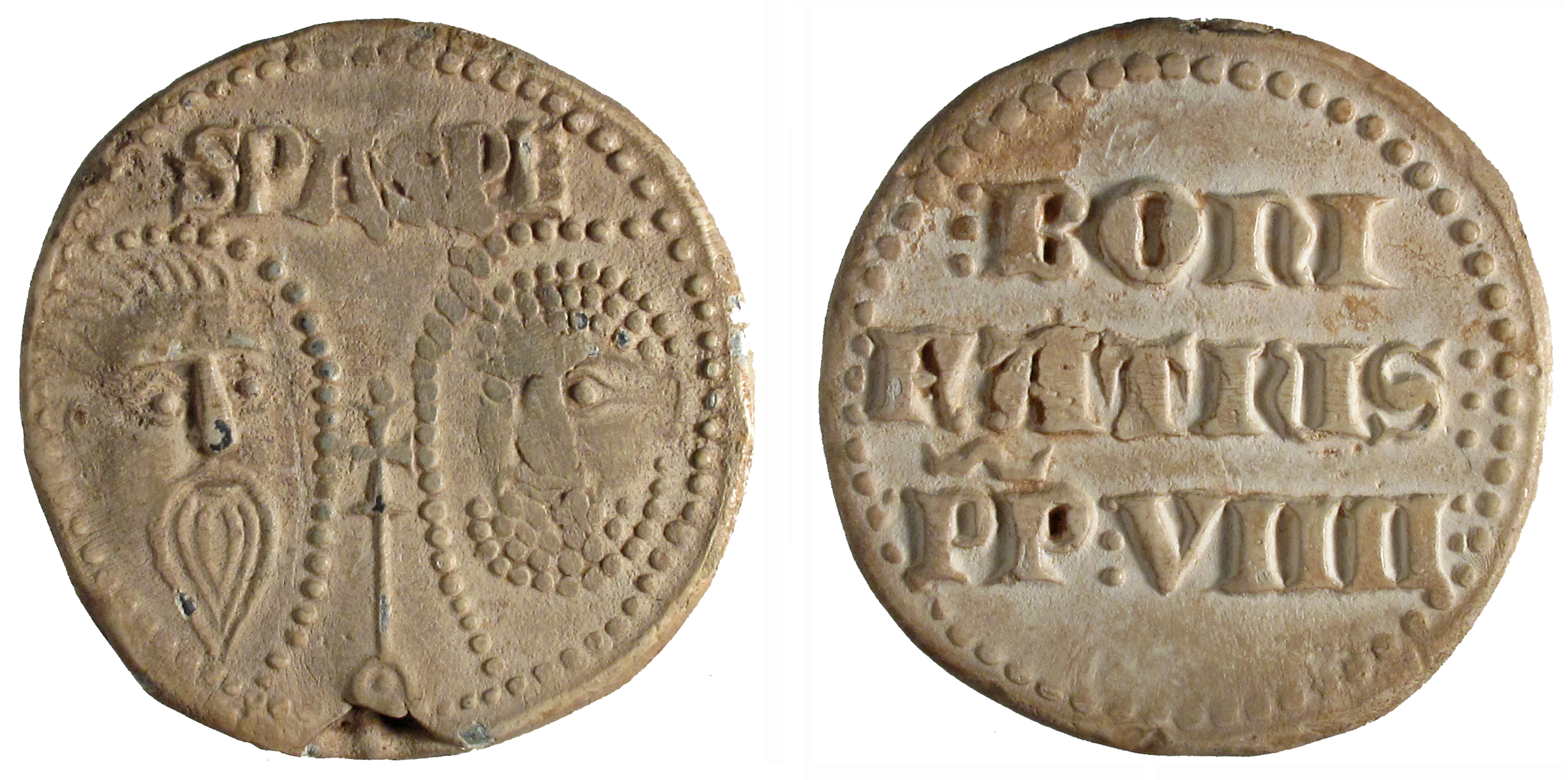
Bulla of Boniface IX

In Germany, the prince-electors met at Rhense on 20 August 1400 to depose Wenceslaus as King of Germany and chose in his place Rupert, Duke of Bavaria and Count Palatine of the Rhine. In 1403 Boniface IX recognized Rupert as king.

In 1398 and 1399, Boniface IX appealed to Christian Europe in favor of the Byzantine emperor Manuel II Palaeologus, threatened at Constantinople by Sultan Bayezid I, but there was little enthusiasm for a new crusade at such a time. Saint Bridget of Sweden was canonized by Pope Boniface IX on 7 October 1391. The universities of Ferrara (1391) and Fermo (1398) owe him their origin, and that of Erfurt (in Germany), its confirmation (1392).

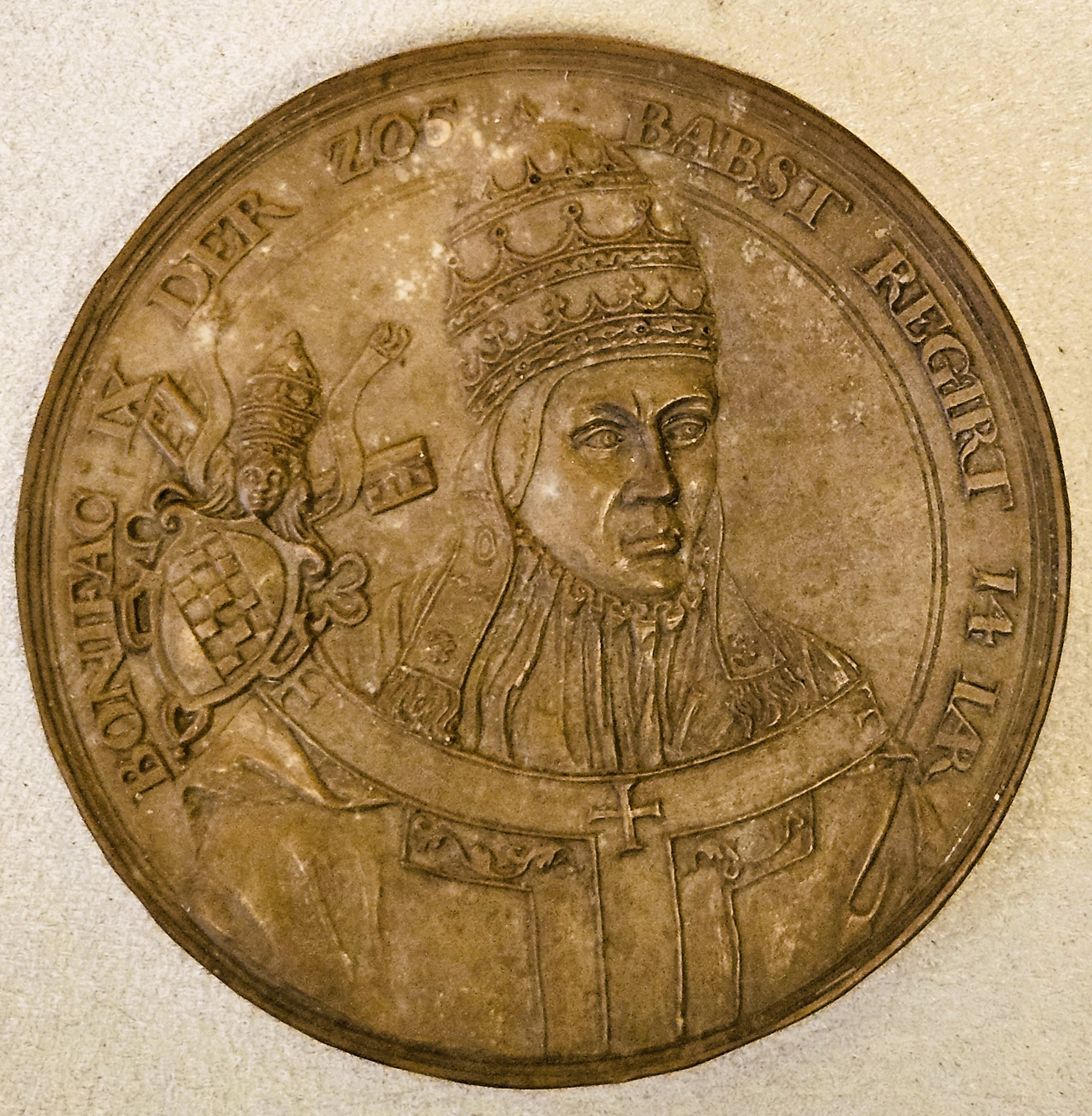
Coin depicting Pope Boniface IX, Bode Museum, Berlin

Boniface IX died on 1 October 1404 after a brief illness.

Boniface IX was a frank politician, strapped for cash like the other princes of Europe, as the costs of modern warfare rose and supporters needed to be encouraged by gifts, for fourteenth-century government depended upon such personal support as a temporal ruler could gather and retain. All the princes of the late 14th century were accused of avaricious money-grubbing by contemporary critics, but among them contemporaries ranked Boniface IX as exceptional. Traffic in benefices, the sale of dispensations, and the like, did not cover the loss of local sources of revenue in the long absence of the papacy from Rome, foreign revenue diminished by the schism, expenses for the pacification and fortification of Rome, the constant wars made necessary by French ambition and the piecemeal reconquest of the Papal States. Boniface IX certainly provided generously for his mother, his brothers Andrea and Giovanni, and his nephews in the spirit of the day. The Curia was perhaps equally responsible for new financial methods that were destined in the next century to arouse bitter feelings against Rome, particularly in Germany.

== See also ==
- Cardinals created by Boniface IX
- List of popes

== Bibliography ==
- Creighton, Mandell (1901). "Chapter III". A History of the Papacy from the Great Schism to the Sack of Rome. Vol. I. London: Longmans, Green.
- Gayet, Louis (1889). Le grand schisme d'Occident: d'après les documents contemporains déposés aux archives secrètes du Vatican (in French and Latin). Vol. II. Paris: Welter. ISBN 9780837090627.
- Valois, Noël (1896). La France et le grand schisme d'Occident (in French). Vol. I of 4 volumes. Paris: Alphonse Picard.
- Friedrich Wilhelm Bautz (1975). "Bonifatius IX". In Bautz, Friedrich Wilhelm (ed.). Biographisch-Bibliographisches Kirchenlexikon (BBKL) (in German). Vol. 1. Hamm: Bautz. cols. 692–692. ISBN 3-88309-013-1.
- Esch, Arnold (1970). "BONIFACIO IX, papa". Dizionario Biografico degli Italiani (in Italian). Vol. 12: Bonfadini–Borrello. Rome: Istituto dell'Enciclopedia Italiana. pp. 170–183. ISBN 978-88-12-00032-6.
- Arnold Esch: Bonifacio IX. In: Massimo Bray (ed.): Enciclopedia dei Papi. Volume 2: Niccolò I, santo, Sisto IV. Istituto della Enciclopedia Italiana, Rome 2000, pp. 570–581 (treccani.it).
- Georg Schwaiger (1983). "Bonifatius IX". Lexikon des Mittelalters, II: Bettlerwesen bis Codex von Valencia (in German). Stuttgart and Weimar: J. B. Metzler. col. 416–417. ISBN 3-7608-8902-6.

Catholic Church titles
Preceded by Urban VI	Pope; 2 November 1389 – 1 October 1404; Avignon claimants: Clement VII & Benedict XIII	Succeeded by Innocent VII
