= Pope Urban VI =

Head of the Catholic Church from 1378 to 1389

- Bishop of Rome
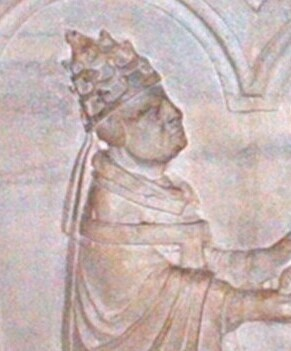
- Effigy of Urban VI contained in his funerary monument
- Church: Catholic Church
- Papacy began: 8 April 1378
- Papacy ended: 15 October 1389
- Predecessor: Gregory XI
- Successor: Boniface IX
- Opposed to: Avignon claimant: Clement VII

Orders
- Consecration: 21 March 1364

Personal details
- Born: Bartolomeo Prignano c. 1318 Itri, Kingdom of Naples
- Died: 15 October 1389 (aged 70–71) Rome, Papal States
- Coat of arms

Pope Urban VI (Latin: Urbanus VI; Italian: Urbano VI; c. 1318 – 15 October 1389), born Bartolomeo Prignano (Italian pronunciation: [bartoloˈmɛːo priɲˈɲaːno]), was head of the Catholic Church from 8 April 1378 to his death, in October 1389. He was the last pope elected from outside the College of Cardinals. His pontificate began shortly after the end of the Avignon Papacy. It was marked by immense conflict between rival factions as a part of the Western Schism, with much of Europe, such as France, the Iberian Kingdoms of Castile and Aragon, and Scotland recognizing Clement VII, based in Avignon, as the true pope.

== Early life ==
Prignano was born in 1318 in Itri, what was then part of the Kingdom of Naples. He was appointed rector of the University of Naples, after receiving a doctorate in canon law. Prignano was also vicar general of the archbishop of Naples. In 1363 he was consecrated Archbishop of Acerenza in the Kingdom of Naples, and worked in the Avignon papal chancery. By 1376, with the departure of Pope Gregory XI to Rome, Prignano was appointed regent of the chancery. He became Archbishop of Bari in 1377.

Prignano had developed a reputation for simplicity and frugality and a head for business when acting vice-chancellor. He also demonstrated a penchant for learning, and, according to Cristoforo di Piacenza, he had no family allies in an age of nepotism, although once in the papal chair he elevated four cardinal-nephews and sought to place one of them in control of Naples. His great faults undid his virtues: Ludwig von Pastor summed up his character: "He lacked Christian gentleness and charity. He was naturally arbitrary and extremely violent and imprudent, and when he came to deal with the burning ecclesiastical question of the day, that of reform, the consequences were disastrous."

== Election ==
Map showing support for Avignon (red) and Rome (blue) during the Western Schism

On the death of Gregory XI (27 March 1378), a Roman mob surrounded the conclave to demand a Roman pope be chosen. With the cardinals being under some haste and great pressure to avoid the return of the papal seat to Avignon, Prignano was unanimously chosen Pope on 8 April 1378 as acceptable to the disunited majority of French cardinals, taking the name Urban VI. Not being a cardinal, he was not well known. Immediately following the conclave, most of the cardinals fled Rome before the mob could learn that not a Roman (though not a Frenchman either), but a subject of Queen Joan I of Naples, had been chosen.

Though the coronation was carried out in scrupulous detail, leaving no doubt as to the legitimacy of the new pontiff, the French were not particularly happy with this move and began immediately to conspire against this pope. Urban VI did himself no favors; whereas the cardinals had expected him pliant, he was considered arrogant and angry by many of his contemporaries. Dietrich of Nieheim reported the opinion of the cardinals that his elevation had turned his head, and Froissart, Leonardo Aretino, Tommaso de Acerno and St. Antoninus of Florence recorded similar conclusions.

== Papacy (1378–1389) ==
=== Crisis of control ===
Immediately following his election, Urban began preaching intemperately to the cardinals (some of whom thought the delirium of power had made Urban mad and unfit for rule), insisting that the business of the Curia should be carried on without gratuities and gifts, forbidding the cardinals to accept annuities from rulers and other lay persons, condemning the luxury of their lives and retinues, and the multiplication of benefices and bishoprics in their hands. Nor would he remove again to Avignon, thus alienating King Charles V of France.

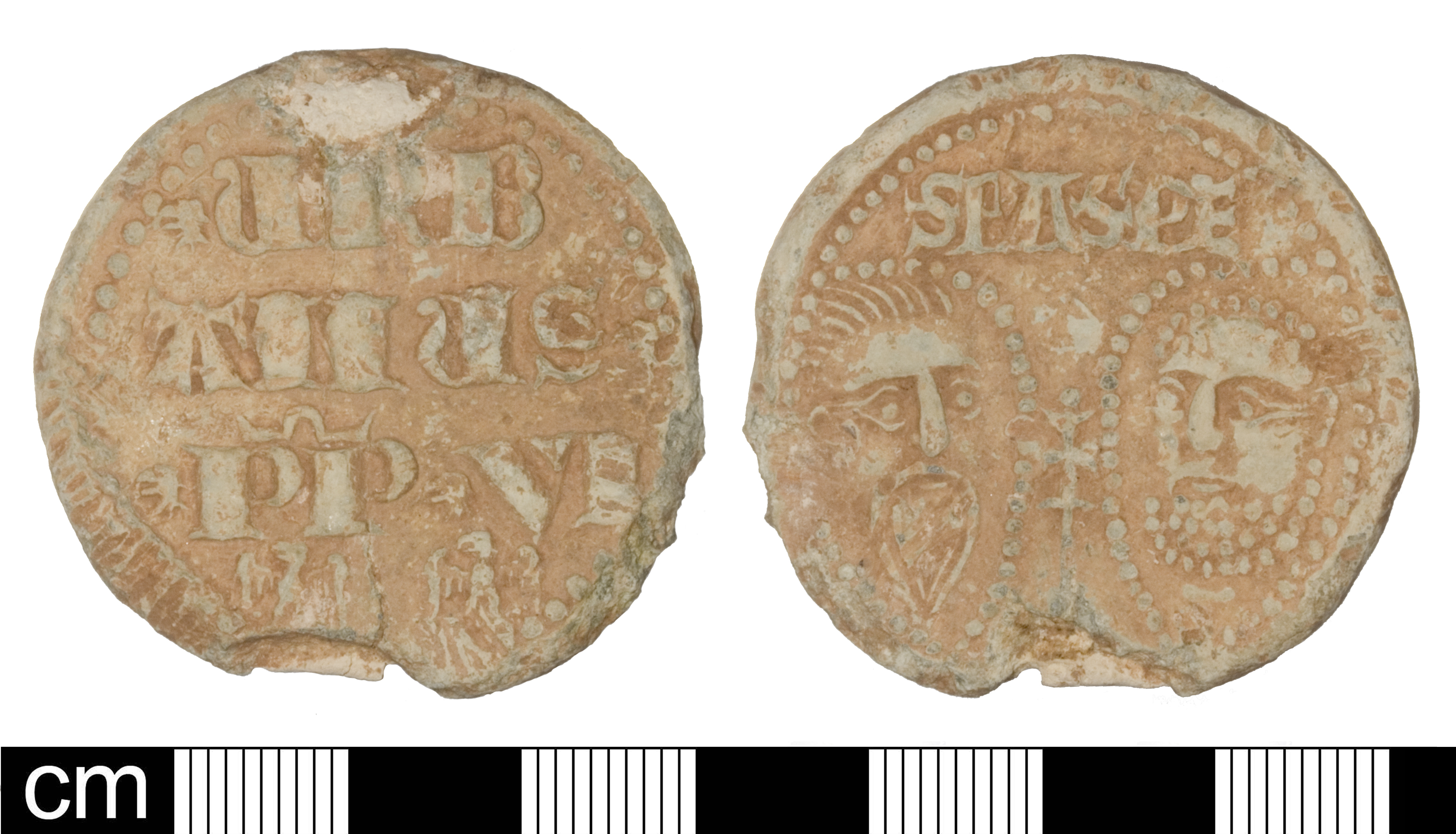
Bulla of Urban VI

The cardinals were mortally offended. Five months after his election, the French cardinals met at Anagni, inviting Urban, who realized he would be seized, and perhaps slain. In his absence, they issued a manifesto of grievances on 9 August which declared his election invalid since they had been cowed by the mob into electing an Italian. Letters to the missing Italian cardinals followed on 20 August declaring the papal throne vacant (sede vacante). Then at Fondi, secretly supported by the king of France, the French cardinals proceeded to elect Robert of Geneva as pope on 20 September. Robert, a militant cleric who had succeeded Albornoz as commander of the papal troops, took the name Clement VII, beginning the Western Schism, which divided Catholic Christendom until 1417.

Urban was declared excommunicated by the French antipope and was called "the Antichrist", while Catherine of Siena, defending Pope Urban, called the cardinals "devils in human form." Coluccio Salutati identified the political nature of the withdrawal: "Who does not see," the Chancellor openly addressed the French cardinals, "that you seek not the true pope, but opt solely for a Gallic pontiff." Opening rounds of argument were embodied in John of Legnano's defense of the election, De fletu ecclesiæ, written and incrementally revised between 1378 and 1380, which Urban caused to be distributed in multiple copies, and in the numerous rebuttals that soon appeared. Events overtook the rhetoric, however; 26 new cardinals were created in a single day, and by an arbitrary alienation of the estates and property of the church, funds were raised for open war. At the end of May 1379 Clement went to Avignon, where he was more than ever at the mercy of the king of France. Louis I, Duke of Anjou, was granted a phantom kingdom of Adria to be carved out of papal Emilia and Romagna, if he could unseat the pope at Rome.

=== War of the Eight Saints ===
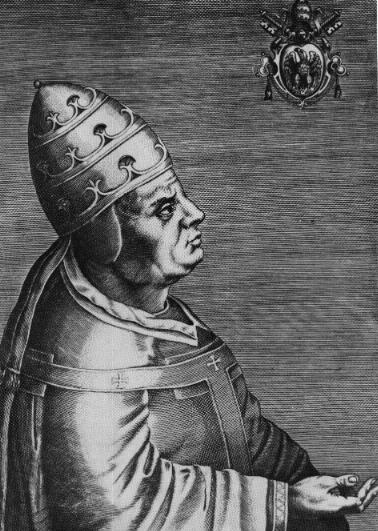
Posthumous portrait of Urban VI by Onofrio Panvinio

Meanwhile, the War of the Eight Saints, carried on with spates of unprecedented cruelty to civilians, was draining the resources of Florence, though the city ignored the interdict placed upon it by Gregory, declared its churches open, and sold ecclesiastical property for 100,000 florins to finance the war. Bologna had submitted to the Church in August 1377, and Florence signed a treaty at Tivoli on 28 July 1378 at a cost of 200,000 florins indemnity extorted by Urban for the restitution of church properties, receiving in return the papal favor and the lifting of the disregarded interdict.

Urban's erstwhile patroness, Queen Joan I of Naples, deserted him in the late summer of 1378, in part because her former archbishop had become her feudal suzerain. Urban now lost sight of the larger issues and began to commit a series of errors. He turned upon his powerful neighbor Joan, excommunicated her as an obstinate partisan of Clement, and permitted a crusade to be preached against her. Soon her enemy and cousin, the "crafty and ambitious" Charles III, was made King of Naples on 1 June 1381, and was crowned by Urban. Joan's authority was declared forfeit, and Charles murdered her in 1382. "In return for these favours, Charles had to promise to hand over Capua, Caserta, Aversa, Nocera, and Amalfi to the pope's nephew, a thoroughly worthless and immoral man."

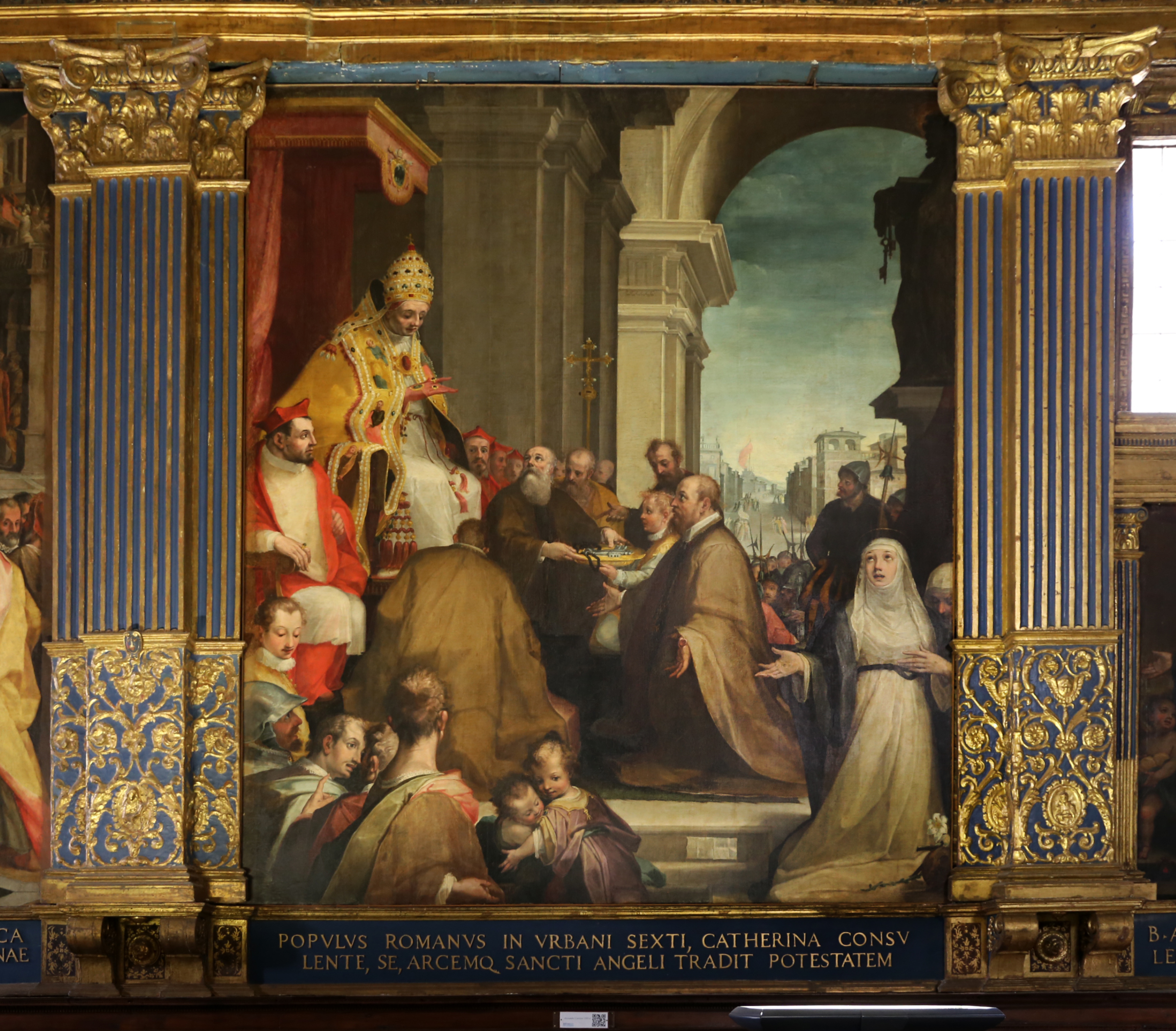
Painting in the house of Catherine of Siena, showing Urban VI receiving the keys of Castel Sant'Angelo.

Once ensconced at Naples, Charles found his new kingdom invaded by Louis of Anjou and Amadeus VI of Savoy; hard-pressed, he reneged on his promises. In Rome, the Castel Sant'Angelo was besieged and taken, and Urban was forced to flee. In the fall of 1383 he was determined to go to Naples and press Charles in person. There he found himself virtually a prisoner. After a first reconciliation, with the death of Louis (20 September 1384), Charles found himself freer to resist Urban's feudal pretensions, and relations took a turn for the worse. Urban was shut up in Nocera, from the walls of which he daily fulminated his anathemas against his besiegers, with bell, book and candle; a price was set on his head.

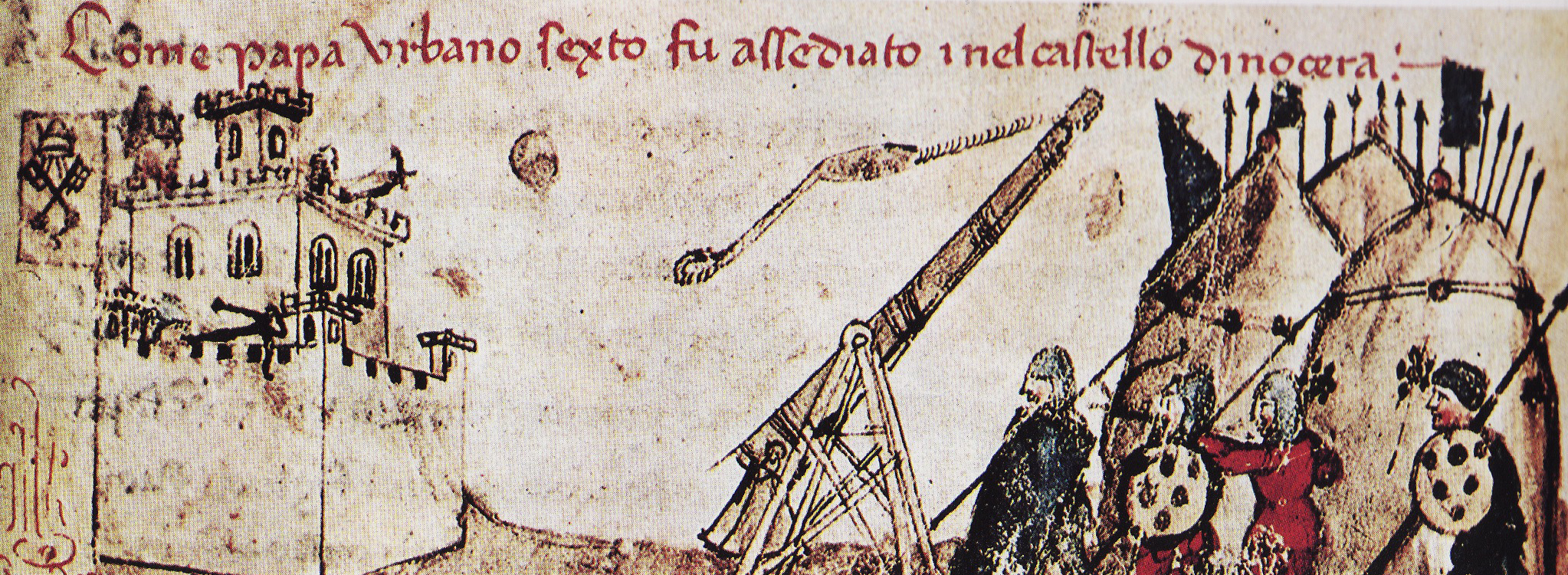
"Pope Urban the sixth was besieged in the castle of Nocera", from Croniche of Giovanni Sercambi

Rescued by two Neapolitan barons who had sided for Louis, Raimondello Orsini and Tommaso di Sanseverino, after six months of siege he succeeded in making his escape to Genoa with six galleys sent him by doge Antoniotto Adorno. Several among his cardinals who had been shut up in Nocera with him were determined to make a stand, proposing that the Pope, due to incapacity and obstinacy, be put in the charge of one of the cardinals. Urban had them seized, tortured and put to death, "a crime unheard of through the centuries" the chronicler Egidio da Viterbo remarked.

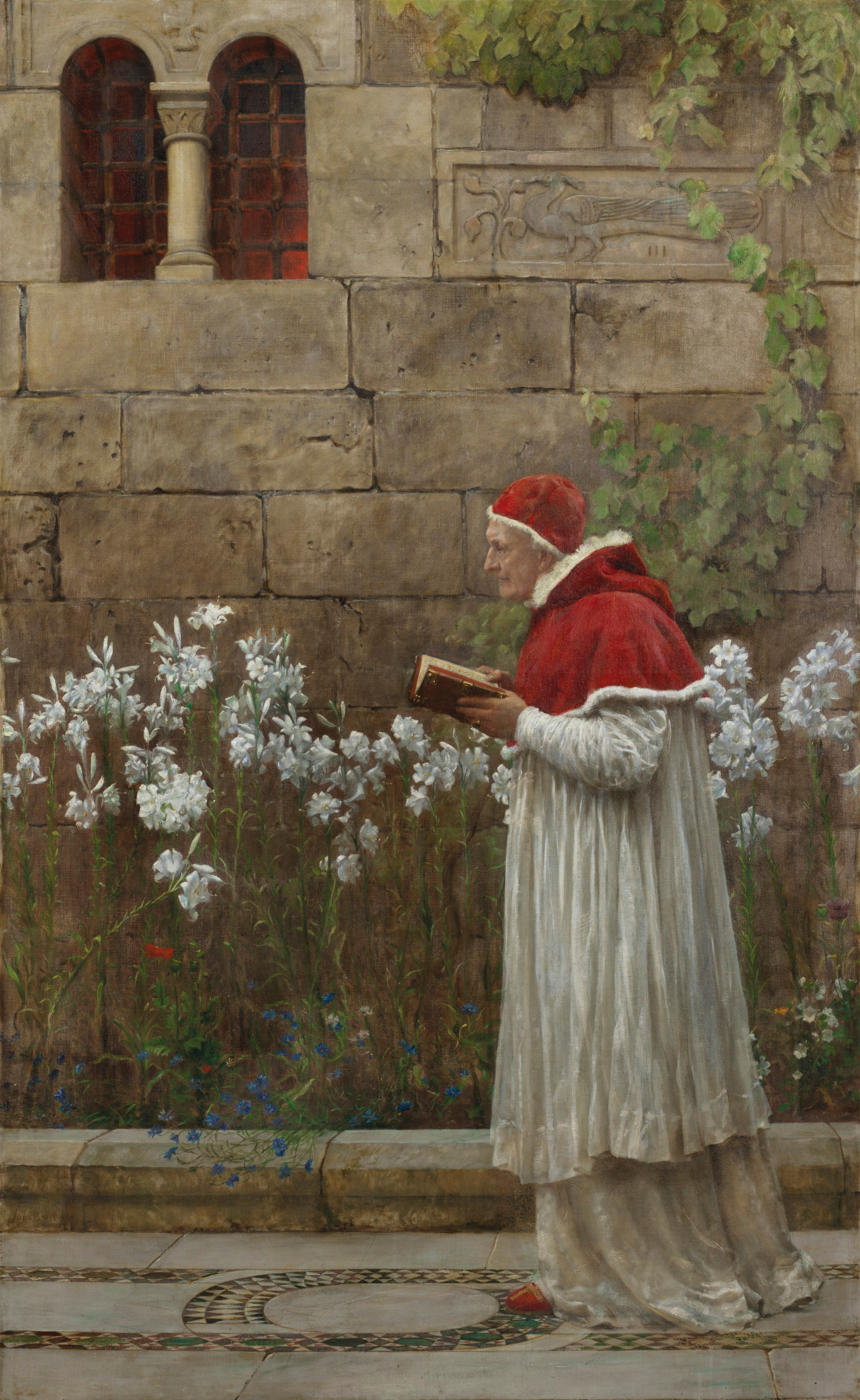
Portrait of Urban VI in captivity by John Maler Collier, 1896.

Urban's support had dwindled to the northern Italian states, Portugal, England, and Emperor Charles IV, who brought with him the support of most of the princes and abbots of Germany.

On the death of Charles of Naples on 24 February 1386, Urban moved to Lucca in December of the same year. The Kingdom of Naples was contended between a party favouring Charles's son Ladislaus and Louis II of Anjou. Urban contrived to take advantage of the anarchy which had ensued (as well as of the presence of the feeble Maria as Queen of Sicily) to seize Naples for his nephew Francesco Moricotti Prignani. In the meantime he was able to have Viterbo and Perugia return to the Papal control.

=== Injury and death ===
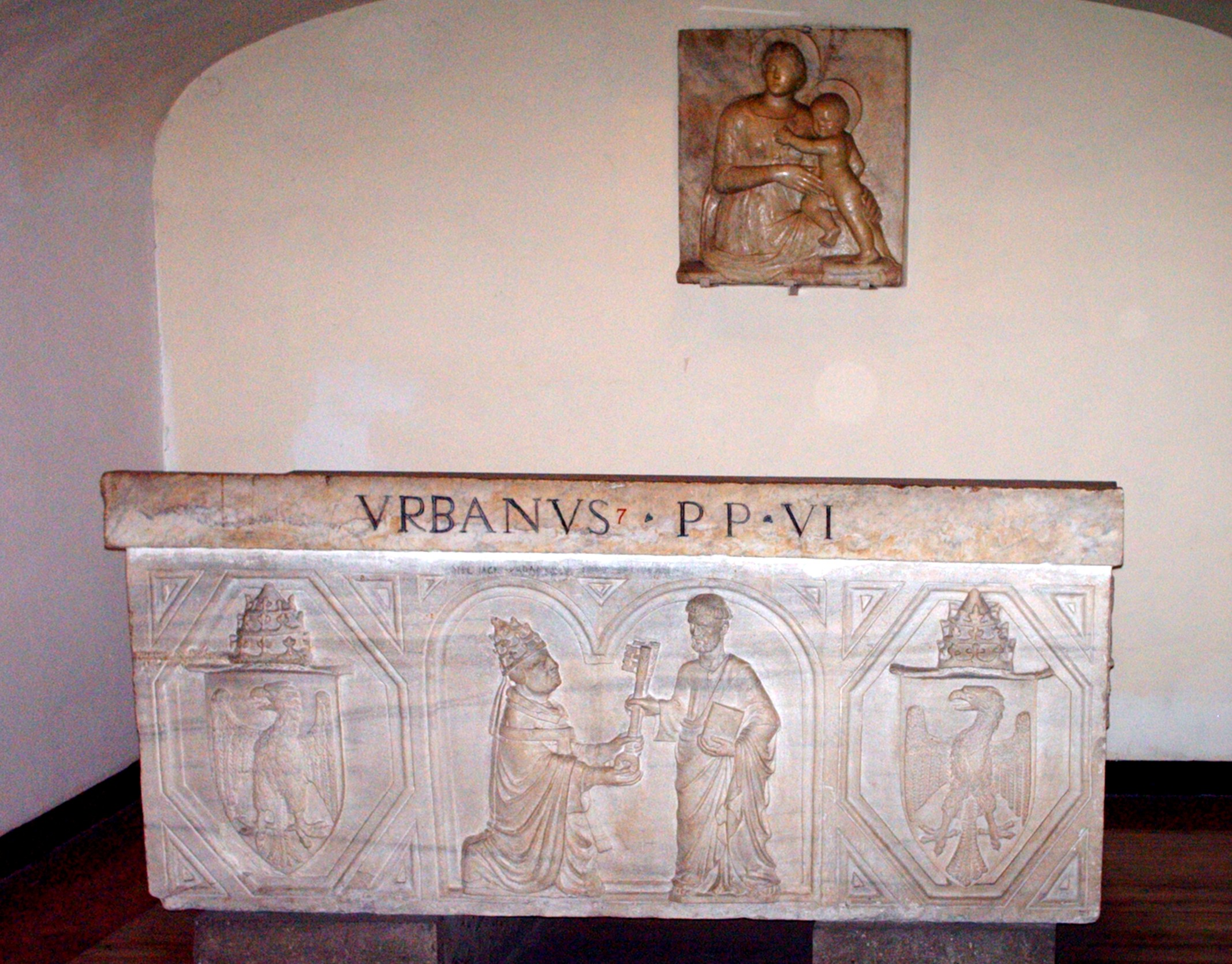
Tomb of Urban VI

In August 1388 Urban moved from Perugia with thousands of troops. To raise funds he had proclaimed a Jubilee to be held in 1390. At the time of the proclamation, only 38 years had elapsed since the previous Jubilee, which was celebrated under Clement VI. During the march, Urban fell from his mule at Narni and had to recover in early October in Rome, where he was able to oust the communal rule of the banderesi and restore the papal authority. He died soon afterwards, likely of injuries caused by the fall, but not without rumors of poisoning. He was succeeded by Boniface IX.

During the reconstruction of Saint Peter's Basilica, Urban's remains were almost dumped out to be destroyed so his sarcophagus could be used to water horses. The sarcophagus was saved only when church historian Giacomo Grimaldi arrived and, realizing its importance, ordered it preserved.

== See also ==
- Cardinals created by Urban VI
- List of popes
- The Bad Popes

== Notes ==
Catholic Church titles
Preceded by Gregory XI	Pope; 1378 – 1389 with Clement VII as antipope	Succeeded by Boniface IX
