= Antoine de Challant =

Savoyard cleric

Antoine de Challant (c. 1350 – 4 September 1418) was a Savoyard cleric who served as Chancellor to the Count of Savoy and was later co-opted into the papal curia by Pope Benedict XIII of the Avignon Obedience. Pope Benedict created him a cardinal and appointed him Archbishop of Moûtiers-Tarentaise. Challant primarily acted as a diplomat for the pope, focusing on negotiations to resolve the Great Western Schism. However, much of his efforts were aimed at preventing Benedict from being repudiated by the French government.

Eventually, Challant abandoned Benedict and joined the cardinals who called for a general council of the Church. He participated in the Council of Pisa and was one of the electors of Pope Alexander V. He later participated in the Council of Constance and was also one of the electors of Pope Martin V.

== Biography ==
Antoine de Challant, (Note: In Latin he was Antonius de Chalanco.) whose family was one of the four great families of the Val d'Aosta, was the son of Aymon de Challant, the Lord of Fenis, Castellan of Lanzo, Moriana, Avigliana, Chambéry, Tarentaise, Susa, Montmélian, Ivrea, Bard, Sallanches and Castruzzone, Governor of Ivrea, and Bailiff of Val di Susa and Savoy. His mother was Fiorina Provana, of the Counts of Leyni. His elder brother Bonifacio became Lord of Fenis. His brother Guillaume was Bishop of Lausanne from 1406 to 1431.

Antoine was an Archdeacon of Reims from 1388 and Archdeacon of Chartres (1394), and at his death he was Prior of Chamonix and Megève (diocese of Geneva).

Challant was a Papal Chamberlain and Chancellor of Count Amadeo VIII of Savoy from 1402 to 1404. His patent of appointment to the chancellorship calls him legum doctorem et archidiaconum Remensem. He was succeeded by his brother Guillaume, Abbot of San Michele della Chiusa, on 30 June 1404. In 1411 Cardinal Antoine became Abbot Commendatory of S. Michele.

=== Cardinal of Benedict XIII ===
On 9 May 1404 Antoine de Challant was named a cardinal by Pope Benedict XIII, and assigned the Deanery of Santa Maria in Via Lata. On 1 June 1404 Pope Benedict XIII named Cardinal Chaillant Archbishop of Tarentaise, but since he was not consecrated a bishop, he could only serve as Apostolic Administrator. He served until his death.

Early in 1406 Challant was sent to Paris by Benedict XIII to defend his interests as calls for the subtraction of obedience to the Avignon pope grew, especially in the University. Challat was badly received, and the royal princes did not wish to recognize his status as papal Legate. He was not received at Court by King Charles VI until 29 April. His address received a reply from the orator of the University of Paris, Jean Petit, on 13 May, in which Benedict XIII was strongly attacked for his bad faith and tricks. The demand for subtraction of obedience was renewed in the strongest terms. The matter was referred to the Parlement, where, on 5 June the matter was presented again by Jean Petit, and seconded by the King's advocate, Jean Juvénal des Ursins. The matter was discussed until 14 July, when the Parlement decided against Benedict XIII and the University of Toulouse, and Cardinal de Challant was compelled to withdraw.

=== Revolt against Benedict XIII ===
He was present at the Council of Pisa, which was held from 25 March to 2 August 1409. He did not appear until the Sixteenth Session, on Monday 10 July 1409, having already been declared contumacious in the Fourth Session because he had not left the Obedience of Benedict XIII and obeyed the summons to attend the Council in Pisa. It was necessary to rehabilitate him, and therefore Cardinal Niccolò Brancaccio (Avignon Obedience), the Cardinal Bishop of Albano, spoke in his favor, claiming that Challant had stayed with Benedict only to attempt to persuade him to end the schism. Challant was allowed to take his seat with the other cardinals in the Council.

In 1411 Pope John XXIII intended to send Antoine de Challant to France as Papal Legate, with even more extensive powers than had been granted to Cardinal Pierre de Thury. The nomination was disapproved by the three royal princes, due (it is said) to Challant's défaut de naissance, son manque d'instruction, ses mauvaises moeurs ('his inadequate birth, his lack of instruction, his bad character'). Challant was later blamed by the French as one of those responsible for the invention of John XXIII's oppressive financial exaction scheme for France.

Challant was promoted to the rank of Cardinal priest of Santa Cecilia by John XXIII on 19 March 1412, and Cardinal Chamberlain.

=== Council of Constance ===
In 1413 Cardinal de Challant was sent by Pope John along with Cardinal Francesco Zabarella and Manuel Chrysoloras on an embassy to the Emperor Sigismund, with the purpose of agreeing on a place to hold a general council of the Church. On 30 October the Emperor announced that the Council would be held in Constance beginning on 1 November 1414.

Cardinal Antoine de Challant participated in the Council of Constance from 1414 to 1418. He acted as a negotiator, between the Italian Natio and the French Nation, and between the Council and John XXIII. In December 1414, a group of negotiators, including Challant, Zabarella, Rinaldo Brancaccio and Branda Castiglione, presented a proposal for relaxing the restrictions placed on the living conditions of the Pope. On 18 March 1415, the Italian Nation met at the Dominican convent in Constance, and sent a committee of five cardinals, including Cardinal de Challant, to the French Nation, to discuss what was to be done about the procuratorship which John XXIII was unwilling to provide.

He was one of the seven cardinals who were present at the Sixth Session of the Council, on Wednesday 17 April 1415, at which the procuratorship granted by Pope John XXIII for the purpose of resigning the papacy was read. Challant was also one of the cardinals who were present at the Eighth Session of the Council on Saturday 4 May 1415, at which the memory and the books of John Wyclif were condemned, and Pope John XXIII, who had fled from Constance on 29 March, was cited for the first time to be present at the Council. He was likewise one of the fourteen cardinals who were present at the Tenth Session on Tuesday 14 May 1415, at which John XXIII was cited to appear for the third time, declared contumacious (delinquent), and suspended from his functions. He was one of the five cardinals (Note: He was accompanied by Giordano Orsini, Amedeo di Saluzzo, Pierre d'Ailly, and Francesco Zabarella.) sent by the Council on 29 May 1415 to inform John XXIII that he had been deposed by the Council.

He was one of the electors of Pope Martin V in 1416.

It was in the rooms of Cardinal de Challant that the draft decree of the condemnation of the German theologian Johannes Falkenberg as an heretic was prepared on 4 January 1418.

On 19 April 1418, during the general Session of the Council of Constance, Cardinal de Challant read the decree of Pope Martin V convoking the next general council. On 22 April he read the decree closing the Council of Constance and granting the indulgences for the attendees.

Cardinal Antoine de Chaillant died in Lausanne on 4 September 1418, where his brother was the bishop. He was buried in the Cathedral.

== Bibliography ==
- Baronio, Cesare (1872). Theiner, Augustinus (ed.). Annales ecclesiastici (in Latin). Vol. Tomus vigesimus sextus (26): 1356-1396. Bar-le-Duc: Typis et sumptibus Ludovici Guerin.
- Besson, Joseph Antoine (1759). Mémoires pour l'histoire ecclésiastique des diocèses de Genève, Tarantaise, Aoste et Maurienne et du décanat de Savoye (in French). Nancy: Sebastien Hénault.
- Cardella, Lorenzo (1793). Memorie storiche de'cardinali della santa Romana chiesa (in Italian). Vol. Tomo secondo. Roma: Pagliarini. pp. 352–353.
- Chacón (Ciaconius), Alfonso (1677). A. Oldoino (ed.). Vitae, et res gestae pontificum Romanorum et s.r.e. cardinalium (in Latin). Vol. Tomus secundus. Roma: P. & A. de Rubeis (Rossi). pp. 740–741.
- Eubel, Conradus, ed. (1913). Hierarchia catholica medii aevi. Vol. Tomus 1 (second ed.). Münster: Libreria Regensbergiana.
- Gallano, Bruno (1998). Les papes d'Avignon et la maison de Savoie, 1309-1409. (Collection de l' École française de Rome, 247). (in French)
- Lovie, Jacques (1979). Les Diocèses de Chambéry, Tarentaise, Maurienne (in French). Paris: Beauchesne.
- Hefele, Karl Joseph (1916). Histoire des conciles, d'après les documents originaux Tome VII, première partie, Paris: Letouzey.
- Millet, Hélène (ed.) (2009). Le concile de Perpignan (15 novembre 1408-26 mars 1409). Actes du colloque internationale.Perpignan, 24-26 janvier 2008. (Études roussillonnaises, 25) Perpignan: Trabucaire. (in French)
- Sainte-Marthe, Denis de (1770). Gallia christiana, in provincias ecclesiasticas distributa (in Latin). Vol. Tomus duodecimus (12). Paris: Typographia Regis.
- Valois, Noël (1896). La France et le grand schisme d'Occident: Le schisme sous Charles V. Le schisme sous Charles VI jusqu'à la mort de Clément VII (in French). Vol. Tome premier. Paris: A. Picard et fils.
- Valois, Noël (1901). La France et le grand schisme d'Occident: Efforts de La France pour obtenir l'abdication des deux pontifes rivaux (in French). Vol. Tome III. Paris: A. Picard et fils.
- Valois, Noël (1902). La France et le grand schisme d'Occident: Recours au Concile général (in French). Vol. Tome IV. Paris: A. Picard et fils.
- Vesan, Sylvain (1905). "Le Cardinal Antoine de Challant," in Société académique religieuse et scientifique de l'ancien Duché d'Aoste, dix-neuvième bulletin, (Aosta 1905, extract 1906], pp. 317–408.

=== External links ===
- Uginet, François-Charles (1980), "Challant, Antoine," Dizionario Biografico degli Italiani 24 (1980). Retrieved: 2017-09-25. (in Italian)
