= Gui de Maillesec =

French Catholic cardinal (died 1412)

Cardinal Gui de Maillesec
- Cardinal-Bishop
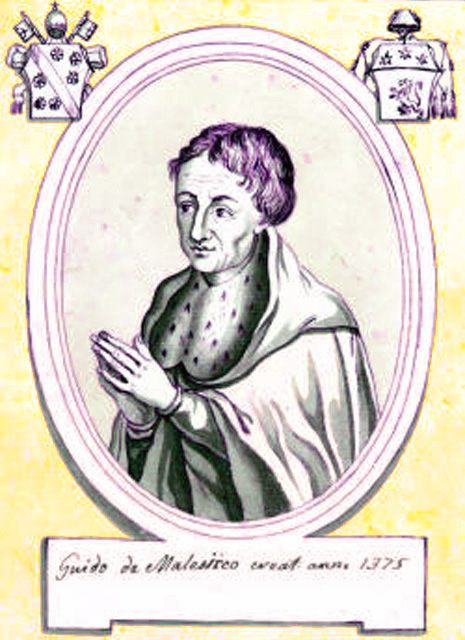
- Church: S. Croce in Gerusalemme (1375-1384)
- Diocese: Palestrina (1384-1412)

Orders
- Created cardinal: 20 December 1375 by Pope Gregory XI

Personal details
- Died: 8 March 1412 Paris FR
- Buried: Couvent des Jacobins, Paris
- Occupation: courtier, bishop, diplomat
- Education: Doctorate in Canon Law
- Alma mater: Toulouse

Gui de Maillesec, also known as Guy de Malsec, Malésec, or Malesset (Latin: Guido de Malesicco; died 8 March 1412), was a French Catholic bishop and cardinal. He may have been a nephew of Pope Gregory XI or perhaps a more distant relative. He was also a nephew of Pope Innocent VI. He played a part in the election of antipope Benedict XIII of the Avignon Obedience in 1394, where he was the second most senior cardinal. He played an even more prominent role in Benedict's repudiation and deposition. Gui was sometimes referred to as the "Cardinal of Poitiers" (Latin: Pictavensis) or the "Cardinal of Palestrina" (Latin: Penestrinus).

== Biography ==
=== Early life and career ===
He was born at the family's fief at Malsec (Maillesec), in the diocese of Tulle. He had two sisters, Berauda and Agnes, who both became nuns at the Monastery of Pruliano (Pruilly) in the diocese of Carcassonne, and two nieces Heliota and Florence, who became nuns at the Monastery of S. Prassede in Avignon.

Gui was Doctor of Canon Law (Toulouse) and Archdeacon of Corbaria in the Church of Narbonne, as well as Chaplain of Pope Urban V. Gui was baptized in the church of S. Privatus, about 30 km (19 mi) southeast of Tulle. He left the church a legacy in his Will of the chalice from his principal chapel and a set of sacerdotal vestments.

On 27 May 1370, Gui was appointed Bishop of Lodève by Pope Gregory XI. He was then promoted Bishop of Poitiers, approved by Pope Gregory XI on 9 April 1371.

=== Cardinal ===
In the Consistory of 20 December 1375, he was elevated to the College of Cardinals by Gregory XI and appointed Cardinal Priest of the titular church of Basilica of the Holy Cross in Jerusalem in Rome. He accompanied Gregory XI on his return to Rome in 1376 and was present at the Pope's death in the Vatican on 27 March 1378.

Cardinal Gui was appointed Canon and Prebend of Stillington in the Church of York on 24 May 1376; he then became Archdeacon of the West Riding in the Church of York in the same year; he was "deprived" by Urban VI of the Roman Obedience, probably in 1379 or 1380. On 15 June 1376, Pope Gregory appointed Gui to be a Canon in the Cathedral of Krakow. On 8 January 1377, he was granted the Priory of Verasenus in the diocese of Vienne, a dependency of the monastery of La Chaise-Dieu. He was Archdeacon of Condroz in the Church of Liège (from 1377).

=== Schism ===
He participated in the riotous election of April 1378, from which came Urban VI, who was, however, repudiated by all the cardinals who had elected him under conditions of force and fear (metus et impressio). According to the narration of events sanctioned by Prignano himself, the "Casus Urbani VI", the Limousin cardinals met immediately after the death of Pope Gregory XI, and decided that their candidate would be Gui de Maillesec. When opposition to any Limousin papal relative developed, however, they switched their support to Pierre de la Vergne. Cardinal de Luna testified that a few days before the April Conclave began, Pierre de la Vergne had a majority of the electors on his side. But the riotous Roman crowds, led by their Bandarenses, changed the whole situation. At a new Conclave, held in safety in Fondi on 20 September 1378, the same cardinals (minus one, who had died, and with the addition of Cardinal Jean de la Grange, who had arrived in Rome in the meantime) elected Cardinal Robert of Geneva, who took the name Pope Clement VII. On 18 December 1378, Clement assigned Cardinal Guy as Apostolic Nuncio to travel to Flanders, Brabant, Scotland, England and the dioceses of Liège, Utrecht, Cambrai and Tournai, to secure adherence to his papacy; Cardinal Guy departed on 31 December, and is known to have been in Paris at Easter. On 10 February 1380, the Cardinal received additional powers with respect to England, Scotland, and elsewhere; and on 6 March 1381, these were extended to the diocese of Reims. He never received his safe-conduct for the realms of King Richard II, however, and thus did not travel to the British Isles. England, however, which was at war with France, had chosen not to support a French pope, and Flanders, which was allied with England, did likewise. Scotland, which were rivaled to the English and had been a traditional ally of the French, supported the Avignon Obedience.

He was then named Bishop of Palestrina in 1384 by Pope Clement VII, a position he held until his death in 1412. Given the schism of the time (1378–1416), Gui's appointment in the Avignon Obedience was contested by Francesco Moricotti Prignani, Archbishop of Pisa, a cardinal of Urban VI (Bartolommeo Prignano) in the Roman Obedience, from 1380 to 1394.

On 18 January 1394, Gui and Cardinal Guillaume d'Aigrefeuille were empowered by a bull issued by Pope Clement VII to proceed to the reform of the College of Sainte-Catherine (Pampilonense) at the University of Toulouse, to the exclusion of Hugues, Bishop of Agde, the Provisor of the College. The two cardinals issued a revised set of statutes on 23 July.

After the election of Cardinal Pedro de Luna as Pope Benedict XIII on 28 September 1394, Gui – as Bishop of Palestrina – ordained the new pope a priest. This took place on Saturday 3 October. On 11 October, he was consecrated a bishop by Cardinal Jean de Neufchatel, Bishop of Ostia, and then crowned pope by Cardinal Deacon Hugues de Saint-Martial. The new pope granted each of the cardinals a coronation-and-election gift of 4,000 gold florins. When Gui wrote his will in 1407, the money had not yet been paid. He left the money which had not been paid by Benedict XIII to Benedict XIII, thereby cancelling the debt while making the Pope aware of his lapse. Benedict also granted Gui certain benefices, the Archdiaconate of Lantario in the Church of Toulouse, the Priorate of Montalto in the diocese of Auch, and the Provostship of Lesinhanno (Lesignan) in the diocese of Narbonne.

=== Repudiation, reconciliation, and further repudiation ===
In 1398, at a meeting of the Church of Gaul, Gui renounced his obedience to Benedict XIII, whose stubbornness was obstructing plans for an end of the Schism and a reunion of the Church. Gui was sent to Paris in January 1399, along with Cardinals Pierre de Thury and Amedeo di Saluzzo, to explain the decisions of the Church Council and to seek the assent of King Charles VI of France to the withdrawal of obedience. The Cardinals were in Paris until the end of June, when the appearance of the plague caused the entire Royal Court to take to the highway. Other meetings, Councils, and negotiations continued for several years, until finally, on 28 May 1403, a reconciliation and return of France to the Obedience of Benedict XIII was announced. A major part had been played by Gui, who, along with Amedeo di Soluzzo, had persuaded an assembly of the French clergy on 15 May and had spoken personally in the presence of the King and the Duke of Orleans on 25 May in favor of the reconciliation.

Gui was Dean of the College of Cardinals, a matter of seniority, in the Obedience of Avignon from August 1405 until his death.

Benedict XIII, however, continued to be under intense pressure to end the schism. He repeatedly promised to do everything he could to achieve that goal, and then found obstacle after obstacle to its realization. In May 1408, he sent an embassy to Italy to negotiate with Pope Gregory XII. The embassy was led by four cardinals, Gui, Pierre de Thury, Pierre Blau (who died on 12 December 1409), and Antoine de Chalant In accordance with the written instructions given them, the cardinals were to get in touch with the cardinals of Gregory XII and sound them out as to the prospects for a General Council of the Church.

At Livorno, the embassy happened to meet some of the cardinals of Gregory XII who had fled from his court, which was living in exile in Lucca at the time. Those cardinals had fled on 11 and 12 May, fearing arrest and worse at the hands of that Pope's nephew, Paolo Corraro. Paolo had already tried unsuccessfully to seize Jean Gilles, Cardinal of Liège (who died on 1 July 1408). The Gregorian cardinals were Francesco Uguccione (the Cardinal of Bordeaux), Giordano Orsini, Niccolò Brancaccio and Angelo de Sommariva. On 29 June 1408, the cardinals of both Observances published a document on which they had reached agreement, pledging themselves to summon a General Council of the entire Church, and that if both papal claimants did not give peace to the Church by mutual cessation (resignation), the General Council would take action. They agreed that they would not maintain their adherence to either claimant. They agreed that they would pay no attention to the diminution in the status of any or all of them made by either claimant after 1 May 1408. They also agreed that if one of the claimants died, his cardinals would not proceed to an election, until consultation with the Church had been undertaken concerning the surviving claimant, or the claimant had resigned. The manifesto was signed by the thirteen cardinals who were present, led by Gui, and later subscribed to by six other cardinals. Cardinal Jean Gilles was dying and did not sign.

The opening solemnities of the Council of Pisa took place in the Cathedral on 25 March 1409. Gui was the senior cardinal in attendance. On 10 May, the cardinals took a preliminary vote on the deposition of the two popes, which was completely in favor, except for Cardinals Brancacci and Gui, who asked for time for further consideration. At the fifteenth session, which took place on 5 June 1409, the two papal claimants, Benedict XIII and Gregory XII, were declared to be notorious schismatics, heretics and perjurers, and were anathematized.

=== Conclave of 1409 ===
With the ground cleared, the cardinals then proceeded to a papal election. The Conclave opened in the Episcopal Palace in Pisa on 15 June, a sort of Novendiales (the traditional nine days of mourning for a dead pope) being observed. Twenty three cardinals entered the conclave on the opening day, and they were joined the next day by Cardinal Antonio Calvi. Gui presided. There were ten cardinals of the Avignon Obedience and fourteen others. Two days before the Conclave began, the cardinals had entered into an agreement that it would take at least a two-thirds vote of each of the two Obediences for a valid election, thereby ensuring that both Obediences would accept the result as valid. The French faction, however, had enough votes that they could easily elect a French pope and a French pope would likely be rejected both by the followers of Gregory XII and those of Benedict XIII, thereby continuing the Schism. The French, therefore, had to find a candidate who would be agreeable to their faction and who would be embraced by the others as well. That person could not be a Frenchman. But the French would never accept a pope who was associated with one of their enemies in Italy, especially Ladislaus of Naples. Eventually, on 26 June 1409, the Cardinals agreed unanimously on a Franciscan from Crete who had been raised in Venice, Pietro Filargi, O.Min., who took the throne name Alexander V. Pope Alexander survived his election a little over ten months, dying at Bologna on his way back to Rome on the night of 3–4 May 1410.

=== Later years ===
He wrote his last will and testament at Avignon on 12 September 1407, adding a codicil on 18 March [O.S. 8 March] 1411, "laying on my sickbed, and, although weak with old age and unsound of body, healthy in mind, speaking clearly, composed in spirit, constant in faith, by no means doubting in hope, contrite and humble of heart...". His residual legatee was Guillaume de Malsec, the second son of Chevalier Reynaud de Rossignac.

He was sent to France in 1410 by John XXIII, the successor of Alexander V.

On the death of Hugh de Montruc, Bishop of Agde (dioecesis Agathensis), a suffragan of Narbonne, on 27 July 1408, Gui was appointed Administrator of the diocese, until a new bishop was named on 8 June 1411. In 1411, the University of Paris was so moved by the age and limited income of Gui that they sent a letter to Pope John XXIII, having heard that he was about to assign the income of the diocese of Agde to someone else, begging him not to do so.

=== Death ===
Gui de Maillesec died in Paris in the spring of 1412, either on 8 March (actually the date of the signing of the codicil to his will) or on 4 April (actually the date on which the Apostolic Camera first records his passing). In fact his will was registered with the Parliament of Paris, in accordance with his codicil, on 12 March, and in the document he is spoken of as "deceased" (ledit defunt).

He was buried in the now-demolished church of the Couvent des Jacobins in Paris.

== Bibliography ==
- Baluze [Baluzius], Etienne [Stephanus] (1693). Vitae paparum Avenionensium, hoc est, Historia pontificum romanorum qui in Gallia sederunt ab anno Christi MCCCV. usque ad annum MCCCXCIV (in Latin). Vol. Tomus primus. Paris: apud Franciscum Muguet. Nouvelle edition by G. Mollat II (Paris 1927).
- Baluze, Etienne (1693). Vitae Paparum Avenionensium, Hoc est Historia Pontificum Romanorum qui in Gallia sederunt ab anno Christi MCCCV usque ad annum MCCCXCIV (in Latin). Vol. Tomus secundus. Paris: Muguet.
- Baronio [Baronius], Cesare (1872). Augustinus Theiner (ed.). Annales ecclesiastici: A. D. 1-1571 denuo excusi et ad nostra usque tempora perducti ab Augustino Theiner (in Latin). Vol. Tomus 26. Bar-le-Duc: Typis et sumptibus Ludovici Guerin.
- Du Chesne, François (1660). Histoire De Tous Les Cardinaux François De Naissance (in French). Vol. Tome I. Paris: Aux despens de l' Autheur. pp. 641–644.
- Du Chesne, François (1660). Preuves de l' Histoire de tous les cardinaux François de naissance (in French and Latin). Paris: Aux despens de l'Autheur & se vendent chez luy. pp. 458–464.
- Eubel, Conradus, ed. (1913). Hierarchia catholica, Tomus 1 (second ed.). Münster: Libreria Regensbergiana.. (in Latin)
- Renouard, Yves (1970). The Avignon papacy, 1305-1403. Hamden CT USA: Archon Books. ISBN 978-0-208-01156-5.
- Rollo-Koster, Joëlle (2015). Avignon and Its Papacy, 1309–1417: Popes, Institutions, and Society. New York-London: Rowman & Littlefield Publishers. ISBN 978-1-4422-1534-4.
- Sainte-Marthe, Denis de (1720). Gallia Christiana: In Provincias Ecclesiasticas Distributa... Provinciae Burdigalensis, Bituricensis (in Latin). Vol. Tomus secundus. Paris: Typographia Regia. pp. 1136–1363.
