= Council of Pisa =

1409 ecumenical council of the Catholic Church

Map showing support for Avignon (red) and Rome (blue) during the Western Schism; this breakdown is accurate until the Council of Pisa (1409), which created a third line of claimants.

The Council of Pisa (Latin: Concilium Pisarum; Italian: Concilio di Pisa, also nicknamed the conciliabolo, "secret meeting", by those who considered it illegitimate) was a controversial council held in 1409. It attempted to end the Western Schism by deposing both Benedict XIII (Avignon) and Gregory XII (Rome) for schism and manifest heresy. The College of Cardinals, composed of members from both the Avignon Obedience and the Roman Obedience, who were recognized by each other and by the Council, then elected a third papal claimant, Alexander V, who lived only a few months. He was succeeded by John XXIII.

== Preliminaries ==
During the conclave of November 1406, Cardinal Angelo Correr had promised, along with all the other cardinals who signed the electoral capitulations, that if elected Pope, he would not create new cardinals except to keep the college of the Roman Obedience on a par with the Avignon Obedience. When he was elected Pope Gregory XII, he signed and ratified those capitulations. But in May 1408, without need, he insisted on creating four new cardinals, two of whom were his nephews. The current cardinals objected loudly, citing the Electoral Capitulations, and they actually refused to attend the Consistory to elevate the four new cardinals. On 11 May one of the cardinals, Jean Gilles, left Lucca, where Pope Gregory was staying at the time, and withdrew to Pisa. The Pope's nephew Paolo Correr (Corrario) was sent with troops to fetch him back by force. The papal action was so shocking that seven more cardinals deserted the same evening, and another who had just arrived in Lucca followed along without delay. On 29 June 1408, thirteen cardinals (who held the proxies of two additional cardinals) met in the port city of Livorno, where they prepared a manifesto which looked toward the holding of a general council to bring the schism to an end. Four more cardinals joined in the agreement in writing on 30 August, another on 14 September, another on 5 October, and yet another on 11 October.

On 2 and 5 July 1408, the cardinals at Livorno addressed an encyclical letter to the princes and prelates of the Christian world, summoning them to a general council at Pisa, which was to begin on 25 March 1409. To oppose this project, Benedict XIII convoked the Council of Perpignan; while Gregory XII announced that he would hold a general council in the territory Aquileia, or perhaps that of Rimini. But instead he fled from Lucca with his one remaining loyal cardinal in November 1408, and ended up the guest of the Malatesta family in Rimini. He never made it to Aquileia. The Universities of Paris, Oxford, and Cologne, many prelates, and the most distinguished doctors, like Pierre d'Ailly and Jean Gerson, openly approved the action of the revolted cardinals, and sent delegations to the Council. The princes on the other hand were divided, but most of them no longer relied on the good will of the rival popes and were determined to act without them, despite them, and, if needs were, against them.

The cardinals of the reigning pontiffs being greatly dissatisfied, both with the pusillanimity and nepotism of Gregory XII and the obstinacy and bad will of Benedict XIII, resolved to make use of a more efficacious means, namely a general council. The French king, Charles V, had recommended this, at the beginning of the schism, to the cardinals assembled at Anagni, who had anathematized Urban VI as an Intruder on the papal throne, and elected Pope Clement VII (Robert of Geneva) instead, without dissent. King Charles, on his deathbed, again expressed the same wish (1380), though he and France solidly supported Clement over Urban.

The idea of a general council had been upheld by several regional councils, by the cities of Ghent and Florence, by the Universities of Oxford and Paris, and by some most prominent doctors of the time, for example: Henry of Langenstein ("Epistola pacis", 1379, "Epistola concilii pacis", 1381); Conrad of Gelnhausen ("Epistola Concordiæ", 1380); Jean de Charlier de Gerson (Sermo coram Anglicis); and especially the latter's master, Pierre d'Ailly, the Bishop of Cambrai, who wrote of himself: "A principio schismatis materiam concilii generalis … instanter prosequi non timui" (Apologia Concilii Pisani, in Paul Tschackert). Encouraged by such men and by the known dispositions of King Charles VI and of the University of Paris, four members of the Sacred College of Avignon went to Leghorn where they arranged an interview with those of Rome, and where they were soon joined by others. The two bodies thus united were resolved to seek the reunion of the Church in spite of everything, and thenceforth to adhere to neither of the competitors.

The cardinals considered it their indisputable right to convene a general council to put an end to the schism. The principle behind this was "salus populi suprema lex esto", i.e. that the welfare of the church superseded any legal considerations. The behaviour of the two papal claimants seemed to justify the council. It was felt that the schism would not end while these two obstinate men were at the head of the opposing parties. There was no undisputed pope who could summon a general council, therefore the Holy See must be considered vacant. There was a mandate to elect an undisputed pope. Famous universities upheld the cardinals' conclusion. However, it was also argued that, if Gregory and Benedict were doubtful, so were the cardinals whom they had created. If the source of their authority was uncertain, so was their competence to convoke the universal church and to elect a pope.

== Meeting of the council ==
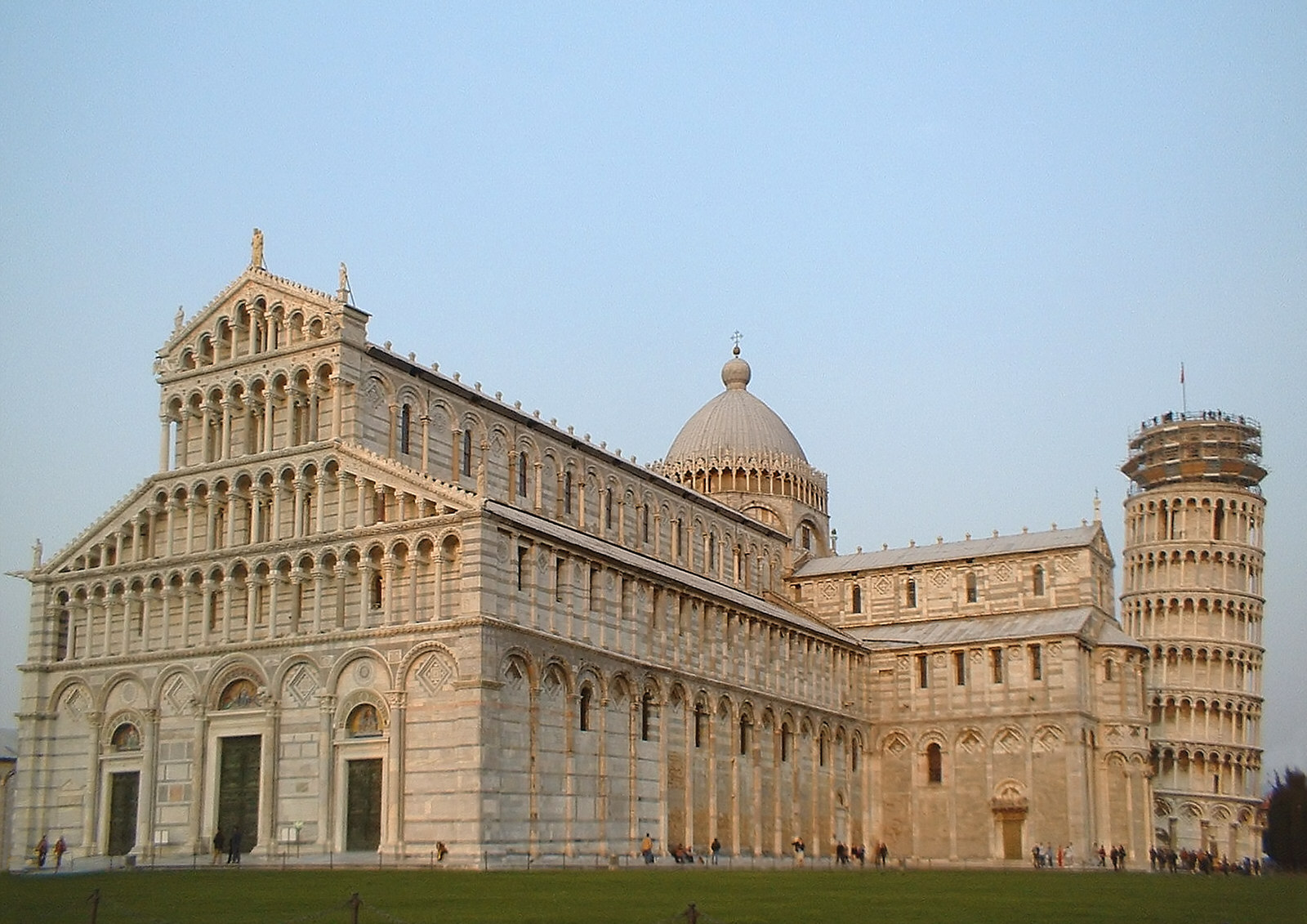
The Cathedral of Pisa at sunset

On 25 March 1409, the Feast of the Annunciation, four patriarchs, 22 cardinals and 80 bishops assembled in the Cathedral of Pisa under the presidency of Cardinal Gui de Malesset, Bishop of Palestrina, the senior cardinal bishop in both Obediences. He had been named a cardinal by Pope Gregory XI on 20 December 1375, before the Schism had even begun. Among the clergy were the representatives of 100 absent bishops, 87 abbots with the proxies of those who could not come to Pisa, 41 priors and generals of religious orders, and 300 doctors of theology or canon law. The ambassadors of all the Christian kingdoms completed the assembly. The opening ceremonies followed the Mass of the Holy Spirit, which was sung by Cardinal Pierre de Thuryeo, Cardinal Priest of Santa Susanna, the senior Cardinal Priest. At the conclusion of a sermon, preached by a master of theology, it was announced that the first general session would take place the next day, 26 March.

At session II, on 26 March, the necessary legal procedure began. Two cardinal deacons, two bishops, and two notaries approached the church doors, opened them, and in a loud voice, in Latin, called upon the rival pontiffs to appear. No one replied. "Has anyone been appointed to represent them?" they added. Again there was silence. The delegates returned to their places and requested that Gregory and Benedict be declared guilty of contumacy. This ceremony was repeated on 27 March, 30 March, 15 April and 24 April. It was announced that on Monday 15 April, the day after Whitsunday, the Council would address the contumacy of Cardinal Antonio de Calvis (Gregorian Obedience), Cardinal Jean Flandrini, Cardinal Lucovico Fieschi, and Cardinal Antoine de Chalant (Benedictine Obedience).

=== German embassy ===
Session IV took place on Monday 15 April. Angelo Correr (Corrario) and Pedro de Luna (Benedict) were again summoned to appear in person or by proxy, as were the four absent cardinals. The ambassadors of Rupert, King of the Romans, were then given audience. The Bishop of Verden, Ulrich von Albeck, made a strong statement against the pretensions of the Council itself, listing twenty-four objections of various kinds that the Germans wished to propound; most involved minutiae of Canon Law. Finally, the German delegation proposed a meeting between the Pisans and Pope Gregory at a mutually agreeable place, a proposition which was old and which had already failed several times. The speech was not well-received, but a response was promised for the next general session, which was scheduled for 24 April. In the meantime, a Sunday sermon by the Dominican Bishop of Digne attacked nearly all the German criticisms, and, seeing nothing to be gained, the German embassy departed Pisa, appealing their grievances to a future council, to be called by Gregory XII. The Council, wishing to proceed through generosity rather than rigor, and since some personages were understood to be en route, announced a continuation of the cases. Throughout the month of May testimonies were heard against the claimants, but the formal declaration of contumacy did not take place until the fourteenth session.

At the fifth session on 24 April, a lengthy document, prepared by the Cardinals, was read out. It took more than three hours. It rehearsed all of the charges against the two popes from the point of view of the cardinals, of which there were thirty-eight, going lightly over their participation in the events; it demanded that the two should be judged to be heretics and should be deprived of their offices. The Council appointed commissioners to examine witnesses.

Carlo Malatesta, Prince of Rimini, adopted a different approach, defending Gregory's cause as a man of letters, an orator, a politician, and a knight, but was still unsuccessful. He returned to Rimini on 26 April, and made his report to Gregory XII and his cardinals. Gregory threatened to call his council at once, but was dissuaded by Malatesta.

Benedict refused to attend the council in person, but his delegates arrived very late (14 June), and their claims aroused the protests and laughter of the assembly. The people of Pisa threatened and insulted them. The Chancellor of Aragon was listened to with little favour, while the Archbishop of Tarragona made a rash declaration of war. Intimidated, the ambassadors, among them Boniface Ferrer, prior of the Grande Chartreuse, secretly left the city and returned to their master.

The sixth session took place on Tuesday, 30 April 1409. At the seventh session on 4 May, Piero d'Anchorano, a professor of law at Bologna, read a refutation of the case presented by the embassy of King Rupert.

=== One College of Cardinals ===
At the eighth session, which took place on Friday 10 May, a proposal was introduced to ratify the amalgamation of the two colleges of cardinals. This had been the intention of the cardinals who had met at Livorno in June 1408, and was expressed in their manifesto. The Bishop of Salisbury, Robert Hallam, made the fatuous objection that the cardinals of Gregory XII had formally withdrawn their obedience, whereas the cardinals of Benedict XIII had not done so, placing the two colleges on a different footing. Then it was proposed that a decree be issued that it was lawful, as well as the duty, for everyone to withdraw from both popes. Several cardinals objected to that proposal, but the Council voted in favor anyway. Then Simon de Cramaud, who was in the Chair, had the original proposal for the amalgamation of the two colleges read out. As demanded, it was confirmed.

The ninth session was held on Friday, 17 May, at which it was decreed that anyone could leave the Obedience of Gregory or the Obedience of Benedict without penalty, but that those who positively refused to leave would be permanently punished. The tenth session took place on Tuesday 22 May, at which a petition was presented to send an embassy to Genoa to engage in negotiations. The two contending parties, Benedict and Gregory, were summoned once again at the doors of the cathedral by two cardinals. A petition was presented to certify that the two cardinals had carried out the summons. A Notary began to read the articles which were being proffered against the two popes, first in general terms and then in detail, citing witnesses and documents. These were produced by the Bishop of Pisa, Alamanno Adimari. Twenty articles were read and accepted before the time for the day's sitting elapsed. The reading and the presentation of witnesses and proofs continued at the eleventh session on 23 May.

=== Deposition ===
On 26 April, the French embassy, led by Simon de Cramaud, who held the title of Patriarch of Alexandria, arrived in Pisa. Contrary to common belief, the French element did not prevail either in numbers or influence. There was a unanimity among the 500 members during the month of June, especially noticeable at the fifteenth general session.

In the fifteenth session on 5 June 1409, when the usual formality was completed with the request for a definite condemnation of Pedro de Luna and Angelo Corrario, the Fathers of Pisa returned a sentence until then unexampled in the history of the Church. All were stirred when the Patriarch of Alexandria, Simon de Cramaud, addressed the meeting: "Benedict XIII and Gregory XII are recognised as schismatics, the approvers and makers of schism, notorious heretics, guilty of perjury and violation of solemn promises, and openly scandalising the universal Church. In consequence, they are declared unworthy of the Supreme Pontificate, and are ipso facto deposed from their functions and dignities, and even driven out of the Church. It is forbidden to them henceforward to consider themselves to be Supreme Pontiffs, and all proceedings and promotions made by them are annulled. The Holy See is declared vacant and the faithful are set free from their promise of obedience." This grave sentence was greeted with joyful applause, the Te Deum was sung, and a solemn procession was ordered next day, the Feast of Corpus Christi. All the members appended their signatures to the decree, and the schism seemed to be at an end.

In the meantime, it became known at Pisa that two of the cardinals of the Obedience of Benedict XIII had abandoned his cause. Cardinal Ludovico Fieschi and Cardinal Antoine de Challant had been declared contumacious in the fourth session of the council, and they were now negotiating to have their status regularized. At session sixteen, on 10 June, Cardinal Challant appeared in the Cathedral, and the question of what to do with him suddenly became critical. Cardinal Niccolò Brancaccio (Avignon Obedience) spoke in his favor, and he was allowed to take his seat with the other cardinals. Then, the Archbishop of Pisa read out a document containing Electoral Capitulations, signed and sealed by each of the cardinals, promising that whoever was elected pope would carry out a reform of the Church, and would not allow the Council to dissolve until that goal had been achieved.

That same afternoon many prelates and others from the French faction met at the Convent of the Carmelites, and discussed the question of how a new pope would be elected. Representatives of the University of Paris were eager that the entire Council should participate in the election, pointing out that many people were already saying that the College of Cardinals was full of Frenchmen, and that a French pope was sure to be elected; only if everyone participated could a convincing election be achieved. Others wanted to stick with the decree issued by Simon de Cramand on 10 May, assigning the task to the cardinals, in accordance with Canon Law. The meeting ended, however, without a decision.

At the seventeenth session, on Thursday 13 June, there was a reading of the relevant sections of Pope Gregory X's constitution ubi majus periculum, in which the magistrates of the host city of a conclave are required to provide security and safety for the participants. The Captain and magistrates of Pisa then took their oaths. Patriarch Simon de Cramaud then informed the Council that, while this was going on, the cardinals had met behind the high altar and had emerged with an agreement to elect only with a unanimous vote, or at least a two-thirds vote of each of the two colleges. Then the three patriarchs read out a conciliar decree, authorizing the cardinals, without regard to obedience, in the name of the Council and by virtue of Canon Law to proceed to an election. A vote of approval was demanded, and despite some grumbling from a French minority, the decree was accepted. And finally a solemn procession and prayers was ordered for the next day, looking forward to the opening of the conclave.

=== Conclave ===
On 15 June 1409 the cardinals met in the archiepiscopal palace of Pisa to elect a new pope. They had decided to observe the requirement of Canon Law that a conclave could not begin until the tenth day after the death of a pope, even though no pope had died. It was sufficient that the Papal See was vacant for ten days.

On 16 June, Cardinal Antonio Calvi, who had finally repudiated Gregory XII, arrived and was admitted to the conclave. He became the twenty-fourth elector. The Council was doing nothing to impede the conclave, or to cast a shadow over any of its prerogatives or proceedings.

The conclave itself lasted eleven days. Few obstacles intervened from outside to cause delay. Within the Council, it is said, there were intrigues, proposing that if the Cardinals failed to elect a pope after a reasonable time, the Council should intervene and make an election, but the proposal did not find favour. There was also a discussion of the cardinals' food allotment, whether the rules of Gregory X or those of Innocent VI should be followed; it was decided, though it did not need to be applied, that the more recent ones of Innocent VI would be used. Instead, through the influence of Cardinal Cossa, on 26 June 1409, the votes were unanimously cast in the favour of Cardinal Pietro Filargo, who took the name of Alexander V. The new pope announced his election to all the sovereigns of Christendom, receiving expressions of support for himself and for the position of the Church. The ambassadors of Florence and of Siena appeared at the council session of 10 July, and offered their congratulations and support to the new pope. The ambassadors of the King of France, who were present at the Council, offered their congratulations as well. He presided over the last four sessions of the Council, confirmed all the ordinances made by the cardinals after their refusal of obedience to the antipopes, united the two sacred colleges, and subsequently declared that he would work energetically for reform.

==== List of participating cardinals ====
Twenty four cardinals participated in the election of Alexander V, including 14 cardinals of the obedience of Rome and 10 of the obedience of Avignon. It must be emphasized that, although the conclave took place during the Council of Pisa, the Council did not participate in the election of the pope.

Cardinals of the obedience of Avignon

- Gui de Malsec (created on 20 December 1375) – Cardinal-Bishop of Palestrina; "Erat primus in ordine Penestrinus."
- Niccolò Brancaccio (18 December 1378) – Cardinal-Bishop of Albano
- Jean de Brogny (12 July 1385) – Cardinal-Bishop of Ostia e Velletri; Vice-Chancellor of the Holy Roman Church
- Pierre Girard (17 October 1390) – Cardinal-Bishop of Frascati; Grand penitentiary
- Pierre de Thury (12 July 1385) – Cardinal-Priest of S. Susanna; Protopriest of the Sacred College of Cardinals
- Pedro Fernández de Frías (23 January 1394) – Cardinal-Priest of S. Prassede
- Amedeo Saluzzo (23 December 1383) – Cardinal-Deacon of S. Maria Nuova; Protodeacon and Camerlengo of the Sacred College of Cardinals
- Pierre Blavi (24 December 1395) – Cardinal-Deacon of S. Angelo in Pescheria
- Louis de Bar (21 December 1397) – Cardinal-Deacon of S. Agata; administrator of the see of Langres
- Antoine de Challant (9 May 1404) – Cardinal-Deacon of S. Maria in Via Lata; administrator of the see of Tarentaise

Cardinals of the Roman obedience

- Enrico Minutoli (created on 18 December 1389) – Cardinal-Bishop of Frascati; Dean of the Sacred College of Cardinals; archpriest of the Liberian Basilica; Camerlengo of the Sacred College of Cardinals
- Antonio Caetani (seniore) (27 February 1402) – Cardinal-Bishop of Palestrina; Grand penitentiary; archpriest of the Lateran Basilica
- Angelo d'Anna de Sommariva (17 December 1384) – Cardinal-priest of S. Pudenziana; Protopriest of the Sacred College of Cardinals
- Corrado Caraccioli (12 June 1405) – Cardinal-Priest of S. Crisogono; administrator of the see of Mileto
- Francesco Uguccione (12 June 1405) – Cardinal-Priest of SS. Quattro Coronati; administrator of the see of Bordeaux
- Giordano Orsini (12 June 1405) – Cardinal-Priest of SS. Silvestro e Martino ai Monti
- Giovanni Migliorati (12 June 1405) – Cardinal-Priest of S. Croce in Gerusalemme; administrator of the see of Ravenna
- Pietro Filargo (12 June 1405) – Cardinal-Priest of SS. XII Apostoli; administrator of the see of Milan
- Antonio Calvi (12 June 1405) – Cardinal-Priest of S. Prassede; archpriest of the Vatican Basilica
- Landolfo Maramaldo (21 December 1381) – Cardinal-Deacon of S. Nicola in Carcere Tulliano; Protodeacon of the Sacred College of Cardinals; legate in Perugia
- Rinaldo Brancaccio 17 (December 1384) – Cardinal-Deacon of SS. Vito e Modesto; commendatario of S. Maria in Trastevere
- Baldassare Cossa (27 February 1402) – Cardinal-Deacon of S. Eustachio; legate in Bologna and Romagna
- Oddone Colonna (12 June 1405) – Cardinal-Deacon of S. Giorgio in Velabro; bishop of Urbino
- Pietro Stefaneschi (12 June 1405) – Cardinal-Deacon of S. Angelo in Pescheria

On the same evening as the election, the new Pope, Alexander V, announced that he would retain Jean de Brogny as the Vice-Chancellor of the Holy Roman Church, and Pierre Girard de Podio as Major Penitentiarius. He also confirmed Archbishop François de Conzié (Conzieu) as Chamberlain of the Holy Roman Church.

=== Council continued ===
The nineteenth session of the council took place on Monday 1 July 1409, with Pope Alexander presiding, and Cardinal de Thureyo singing the Solemn High Mass. Cardinal Antoine de Challant, the junior Cardinal-Deacon, ascended the pulpit and, at the command of the Pope, read out and published the decree of election, which carried the signatures and seals of each of the cardinals. Pope Alexander then gave a sermon on the trinities of virtues appropriate to a pope, to a prelate, and to subjects. Then Cardinal Cossa ascended the pulpit and read out a decree of the Pope, in which he gave his approval to all acts conducted by the cardinals between 3 May 1408 and the beginning of the Council on 25 Marcy 1409, as well as to all acts of the Council itself down to that present moment, supplying whatever might have been lacking in any of those acts.

The Coronation of Pope Alexander V took place on Sunday 7 July 1409.

The next session of the council took place on 10 July, with the Pope again presiding. The embassies of Florence and Siena presented their congratulations and announced their adherence. Through Cardinal de Challant the Pope announced that all penal sentences which had been levelled against anyone by either Gregory XII or Benedict XIII were declared null and void. Another session was scheduled for Monday 15 July, but it was postponed until the 27th at the Pope's request, due to the arrival of Louis of Anjou, the pretender to the throne of Naples.

At the session of 27 July Pope Alexander confirmed the validity of all of the appointments, ordinations and consecrations made by any of the popes during the Schism. He announced through the Archbishop of Pisa, Alamanno Adimari, that, considering the poor financial condition of the Church, he was remitting a wide range of monies owed to the Apostolic Camera, including death duties on deceased prelates, annates, and arrears owed to the Treasury. The members of the General Council responded, Placet! Then the case of Cardinal Fieschi was revisited. He was given two months to appear in person at the Papal Court and swear his obedience. The next meeting was announced for 2 August, though it was postponed until 7 August.

The twenty-second session (or, in Hefele's numbering the 23rd), and its last, took place on 7 August, with the Pope again in the chair. Cardinal Challant again read out a set of decrees. It was forbidden to alienate any immovable property of the Church or of any of the Churches until the next council, at which the matter would be dealt with in detail. Before the next council, provincial and diocesan synods should be held, as well as Chapters of the various monastic organizations, to determine which issues needed to be dealt with. No one was to be ejected from office unless there was good reason, and the action had been approved by a majority of the College of Cardinals.

== Gregory XII's Council at Cividale del Friuli ==
Pope Gregory had responded to the call of the cardinals at Livorno in June 1408 with an announcement that he would hold a council, somewhere in the territory of Aquileia or the territory of Rimini. Aquileia ceased to be an attractive venue when its Patriarch announced his adherence to the Council of Pisa and sent representatives to Pisa. On 19 December 1408 Pope Gregory fixed the town of Cividale as the site of his council. His council held its inaugural session on 6 June 1409, the day after he had been formally deposed by the Council of Pisa. The attendance was so embarrassingly small that he had to issue new letters of convocation on 20 June 1409, with a date of 22 July for the second session. He authorized his friend King Rupert (Ruprecht) to depose any prelate in his domains who refused to obey the summons to his council. He received a severe blow when the Venetians decided to support the Council of Pisa, since Venice controlled both the land and sea routes between Rimini and Cividale.

In that second session, Gregory XII declared that his little assembly was a general council of the entire Church. He then declared all the popes of the Roman Obedience back to Urban VI to be canonical, and he anathematized all the popes of the Avignon Obedience, and included Alexander V for good measure. Another session was held on 5 September 1409, at which he demanded that Peter of Candia (Alexander V) renounce the position to which he had been elected by an uncanonical conclave.

Trapped in Friuli, Gregory XII had to be rescued by ships which had been sent by Ladislaus of Naples. Disguised as a merchant he fled on 6 September, bringing his council to a sudden end. He made first for Ortona on the Adriatic, and then Gaeta in central Italy. His chamberlain, who was playing the part of the pope in order to distract his pursuers, was captured by the soldiers of the Patriarch of Aquileia.

Gregory XII's friend the German king Rupert died on 18 May 1410, leaving Gregory even more isolated.

== Later views of the Council of Pisa ==
The cardinals considered it their indisputable right to convene a general council to put an end to the schism. However, it was also argued that, if Gregory and Benedict were doubtful, so were the cardinals whom they had created. If the source of their authority was uncertain, so was their competence to convoke the universal church and to elect a pope. How then could Alexander V, elected by them, have indisputable rights to the recognition of the whole of Christendom? That may or may not have been the case, but there was one cardinal whose cardinalate preceded the Schism, Guy de Malsec, who had helped summon the Council and who voted in the papal election.

It was also feared that some would make use of this temporary expedient to proclaim the general superiority of the sacred college and of the council to the pope, and to legalize appeals to a future council, a tactic which had already been tried by King Philip IV of France. The position of the church became even more precarious; instead of two heads there were three popes. Yet, because Alexander was not elected in opposition to a generally recognized pontiff, nor by schismatic methods, his position was better than that of Clement VII and Benedict XIII, the popes of Avignon. In fact the Pisan pope was acknowledged by the majority of the Church, i.e. by France, England, Portugal, Bohemia, Prussia, a few parts of Germany, Italy, and the County of Venaissin, while Naples, Poland, Bavaria, and part of Germany continued to obey Gregory, and Spain and Scotland remained subject to Benedict.

Many Catholic theologians and canonists are severe on the Council of Pisa. The Jesuit Cardinal Robert Bellarmine, however, said that the assembly was a general council which was neither approved nor disapproved.

A partisan of Benedict, Boniface Ferrer, the abbot of the Chartreuse of Saragossa, called it "a conventicle of demons". A Saxon monk Theodore Urie, a supporter of Gregory XII, doubted the motives for the gathering at Pisa. Archbishop Antoninus of Florence, Thomas Cajetan, Juan de Torquemada, and Odericus Raynaldus all cast doubt on its authority. On the other hand, the Gallican school either approves of it or pleads extenuating circumstances. Noël Alexandre asserts that the council destroyed the schism as far as it could. Bossuet says: "If the schism that devastated the Church of God was not exterminated at Pisa, at any rate it received there a mortal blow and the Council of Constance consummated it." Protestants applaud the council unreservedly, seeing in it "the first step to the deliverance of the world from the papal hierarchy", and greet it as the dawn of the Reformation (Gregorovius).

== Current papal views ==
The Annuario Pontificio has doctrinally regarded the Roman line of popes as legitimate until 1409, followed by the Pisan popes. Until the mid-20th century, the Annuario Pontificio listed the last three popes of the schism as Gregory XII (1406–1409), Alexander V (1409–1410), and John XXIII (1410–1415). However, the Great Schism was reinterpreted when Pope John XXIII (1958–1963) chose to reuse the ordinal XXIII, citing "twenty-two Johns of indisputable legitimacy." This is reflected in modern editions of the Annuario Pontificio, which extend Gregory XII's reign to 1415. Alexander V and the first John XXIII are now considered to be antipopes.

== Bibliography ==
- Creighton, Mandell (1907). A History of the Papacy from the Great Schism to the Sack of Rome. Vol. I. London: Longmans, Green, and Company. pp. 199–255.
- Erler, Georg (1884). Zur geschichte des pisanischen konzils, abhandlung des oberlehrers (in German). Leipzig: O. Dürr.
- Eßer, Florian (2019). Schisma als Deutungskonflikt: Das Konzil von Pisa und die Lösung des Großen Abendländischen Schismas (1378 –1409). (in German). Wien: Böhlau 2019.
- Finke, Heinrich (1896). Acta Concilii Constanciensis. Erster Band: Akten zur Vorgeschichte des Konstanzer Konzils (1410–1414). Münster i. W. 1896. (in Latin and German)
- Girgensohn, Dieter (1998), "Materialsammlungen zum Pisaner Konzil von 1409: Erler, Finke, Schmitz-Kallenberg, Vincke." Annuarium Historiae Conciliorum 30 (1998): 456–519.
- Graziano di S. Teresa (1965), "Un nuovo elenco dei participanti al concilio di Pisa," (in Italian) in: Ephemerides Carmeliticae 16 (1965), pp. 384–411.
- Gregorovius, Ferdinand (1906). History of the City of Rome in the Middle Ages. Vol. VI, Part II (second revised ed.). London: Bell. pp. 598–611.
- Hefele, Carl Joseph (1916). Histoire des Conciles (ed. H. Leclercq). Tome VII, première partie. Paris: Letouzey 1916. (in French)
- Lenfant, Jacques (1724). Histoire du concile de Pise (in French and Latin). Vol. Tome premier. Amsterdam: chez Pierre Humbert.
- Leinweber, Josef (1975). "Ein neues Verzeichnis der Teilnehmer am Konzil von Pisa 1409," in: Schwaiger, Georg, ed. (1975). Konzil und Papst: Historische Beiträge zur Frage der höchsten Gewalt in der Kirche; Festgabe für Hermann Tüchle (in German). Paderborn: Schöningh. pp. 207–246. ISBN 9783506747853.
- Mansi, J.-D. (ed.), Sacrorum Conciliorum nova et amplissima collectio. editio novissima. Tomus XXVI (Venice: Antonius Zatta 1783)
- Mansi, J.-D. (ed.), Sacrorum Conciliorum nova et amplissima collectio. editio novissima. Tomus XXVII (Venice: Antonius Zatta 1784), pp. 1–503.
- Martène, Edmundus; Durand, Ursinus (1733). Veterum scriptorum et monumentorum historicorum, dogmaticorum, moralium, amplissima collectio (in Latin). Vol. Tomus VII. Paris: Apud Montalant. pp. esp. 1068–1124.
- Salembier, Louis (1907). The Great Schism of the West. London: Kegan, Paul, Trench, Trübner. pp. 234–264.
- Souchon, Martin (1899). Die Papstwahlen in der Zeit des grossen Schismas: Entwicklung und Verfassungskämpfe des Kardinalates von 1378–1417 (in German). Vol. Zweiter Band. Braunschweig: Benno Goeritz. pp. 41–75. ISBN 9780837083841.
- Stuhr, Friedrich (1891). Die Organisation und Geschäftsordnung des Pisaner und Konstanzer Konzils (in German). Schwerin: Druck der Bärensprungschen Hofbuchdruckerei.
- Noël Valois (1902). La France et le grand schisme d'Occident... A. Picard.
- Vincke, Johannes (1938), "Acta Concilii Pisani," Römische Quartalschrift 46 (1938), pp. 81–331.
- Vincke, Johannes (1940). Briefe zum Pisaner Konzil (in German and Latin). Bonn: Hanstein.
