= Pierre de Thury =

French bishop and cardinal (died 1410)

Cardinal Pierre de Thury
- Cardinal-Priest
- Church: Santa Susanna (1385–1410)
- Diocese: Maillezais (1382–1385)

Orders
- Created cardinal: 12 July 1385 by Pope Clement VII
- Rank: Cardinal Priest, then Cardinal Bishop

Personal details
- Born: Bresse FR
- Died: 9 December 1410 Avignon FR
- Residence: Avignon
- Parents: Girard de Thury
- Occupation: diplomat, administrator
- Profession: bishop
- Education: Doctor of Civil and Canon Law

Pierre de Thury (died 9 December 1410) was a French bishop and cardinal of the Avignon Obedience, who served as a royal secretary and Master of Requests, and then as papal Nuncio and Apostolic Legate on several occasions. He participated in two papal elections, those of 1394 and 1409, and was a prominent member of the Council of Pisa in 1409.

== Biography ==
Pierre was born in Bresse, which at the time was part of the County of Savoy. The date of his birth is unknown. His brother Philippe became Archbishop of Lyon in 1389, and Cardinal Pierre de Thury was present as Papal Legate when the remains of Saint Irenaeus of Lyon were examined in 1410. Another brother, Renaud, was Precentor, and then Dean of the Chapter of the Cathedral of Lyon. Their uncle Guillaume, the brother of Girard de Thury, had been Archbishop of Lyon from 1358 to 1365, and had founded a chapel in the parish of Cuisery in Bresse châlonnaise.

=== Early career ===
He obtained the degree of Doctor in utroque iure (Civil and Canon Law), and was a professor of laws. He was Custos of the Church of Lyon. He was appointed Councilor and Ambassador of King Charles VI of France.

In 1381 Master Pierre de Thury attended the assembly of Medina del Campo in Castile, when King John I of Castile undertook the examination of the evidence and witnesses to the papal election of 1378, which had been collected by his agents in Rome, Avignon and elsewhere. Pierre gave a speech in which he argued that the election of Urban VI was invalid, and that of Clement VII was canonical. On 2 April he gave another speech, answering eleven questions which had been posed.

He was Master of Requests by 1382.

He served as Secretary of Memorials for King Charles. He was recommended to Pope Gregory XI by Duke Jean of Berri (Bourges) in 1377, with a view to the Archbishopric of Vienne, but the post had already gone elsewhere.

Pierre was named Bishop of Maillezais by Pope Clement VII (Avignon Obedience) on 2 May 1382, which he held only for a brief time, until he was named a cardinal.

=== Cardinalate ===
Pierre de Thury was promoted to the cardinalate by Pope Clement VII on 12 July 1385. He was named a Cardinal priest with the titular church of Santa Susanna. Despite the brief tenure, he was known thereafter as the Cardinal of Maillezais.

In October 1385 he accompanied his patron Duke John of Berri to Toulouse. The Diary of Bishop Jean le Fevre of Chartres indicates that, on his return from Toulouse, Pierre spent the next three years continuously at the Curia in Avignon.

During the winter of 1389, Cardinal de Thury was sent by Pope Clement VII to the royal court in Paris to brief the King on the critical state of affairs in Naples, and on the efforts of Joanna I of Naples, the widow of Charles of Durazzo, to keep control for her adopted son Louis d'Anjou. He departed the Curia in Avignon on 16 January, and returned on 19 June 1389. The Cardinal also held conversations with Marie of Blois, Duchess of Anjou, the widow of Louis I of Naples and mother of Louis d'Anjou. He was sent as Apostolic Legate to the Kingdom of Naples in June 1390, when Louis of Anjou sailed for Naples to take the crown offered him by Queen Joanna, who had abandoned the Obedience of Urban VI and joined that of Clement VII. He returned on 14 June 1392.

Pope Clement VII died in Avignon on 16 September 1394. Cardinal de Thury participated in the Conclave which elected Cardinal Pedro de Luna, who chose the throne name Benedict XIII, on 28 September. The election came about by scrutiny, according to Benedict's own electoral announcement, and his election was in the end unanimous.

=== Reign of Benedict XIII ===
In 1395 French leaders and a number of courtiers of the Papal Curia set out to persuade Benedict XIII that, for the sake of peace and the union of the Church, he should agree to resign the papacy, if his competitor Boniface IX could be persuaded to do the same ("The Way of Cession"). Many difficulties stood in the way. The French leaders then tried to persuade the cardinals in a private meeting to adopt the view which had been arrived at the royal Court. Thury was of the opinion that reducing Boniface to obedience to the Avignon pope was a better way, but, that if Boniface could be persuaded to resign, the plan of the Court was acceptable. When the embassy had returned to Paris, a number of courtiers at Avignon began to work on the cardinals to retract their agreements. The King, however, wrote a strong letter to the cardinals to stand firm, to which Thury wrote a reply on 12 October stating that he would never retract, and that he wished that the King would try the "Via Cessionis" as soon as possible, for the good of the Church.

After frustrating years of inaction on the part of both popes, the Cardinals at Avignon decided to take action. On 1 September 1398 at Villeneuve eighteen cardinals published the retraction of their obedience to Benedict XIII. One of them was Pierre de Thury.

In January 1399 the cardinals of the Avignon Obedience sent three representatives to Paris, Cardinal Guy de Malsec, Cardinal Pierre de Thury, and Cardinal Amadeo di Saluzzo, to lay before the royal Court their complaints against Benedict XIII. Cardinal de Thury acted as their spokesman in accusing Benedict of being a promoter of heresy, a perjurer, and a person of dissolute morals. They asked that he be deposed and imprisoned, and that the King invite other monarchs to withdraw their obedience from him. Their proposal met with little approval. Two of the cardinals returned to Avignon in July, but Thury remained in Paris.

He presided at the marriage of the Comte de Clermont, son of Louis the Duke of Bourbon, and the Comtesse d'Eu on 24 June 1400 in the royal palace in Paris.

On 29 April 1403 the cardinals finally made their peace with Benedict XIII and returned to his obedience. Cardinals Malsec and Saluzzo were sent to Paris to inform the King. Cardinal Thury and Patriarch Simon de Cramaud were opposed to the reconciliation, but finally went to the King and submitted.

In the Spring of 1407, Pierre de Thury was one of several cardinals appointed by Benedict XIII to deal with an embassy from Gregory XII, which had come to France to attempt to agree upon a place where the two popes could meet and resolve the schism.

=== Council of Pisa ===
Cardinal Pierre the Thury was present and participated in the conference of thirteen cardinals that took place at Livorno, which was then part of the Republic of Genoa, in June 1408, at which the Cardinals bound themselves to summon a general council of the Church to deal with the schism. He was also present on the opening day of the Council of Pisa, 25 March 1409, and sang the Solemn High Mass of the Holy Spirit that opened the Council. He was the senior Cardinal Priest. He voted for the anathematization and deposition of both Benedict XIII and Gregory XII.

He took part in the Conclave of 1409, which began on 15 June and concluded on 26 June with the election of Pietro Filargi, who took the name Alexander V. He accompanied Louis of Anjou, King of Naples, on his visit to Pope Alexander at Prato on 1 November 1409.

On 7 November 1409 Cardinal de Thury left the Curia in Prato, sent by Pope Alexander V to be Legate in Avignon and Papal Vicar, the first to hold that office.

He died during his embassy in France on 9 December 1410.

== Bibliography ==
- Baluze, Étienne (Stephanus) (1693). Vitae Paparum Avenionensis: hoc est, historia pontificum romanorum qui in Gallia sederunt do anno Christi MCCCV usque ad annum MCCCXCIV (in Latin). Vol. Tomus primus. Paris: apud Franciscum Muguet. pp. 1348–1353.
- Cardella, Lorenzo (1793). Memorie storiche de'cardinali della santa Romana chiesa (in Italian). Vol. Tomo secondo. Roma: Pagliarini. pp. 360–361.
- Chacón (Ciaconius), Alfonso (1677). A. Oldoino (ed.). Vitae, et res gestae pontificum Romanorum et s.r.e. cardinalium (in Latin). Vol. Tomus secundus. Roma: P. & A. de Rubeis (Rossi). pp. 682–683.
- Eubel, Conradus, ed. (1913). Hierarchia catholica medii aevi. Vol. Tomus 1 (second ed.). Münster: Libreria Regensbergiana.
