= Niccolò Brancaccio =

Catholic cardinal

His Eminence Niccolò Brancaccio
- Cardinal-Bishop
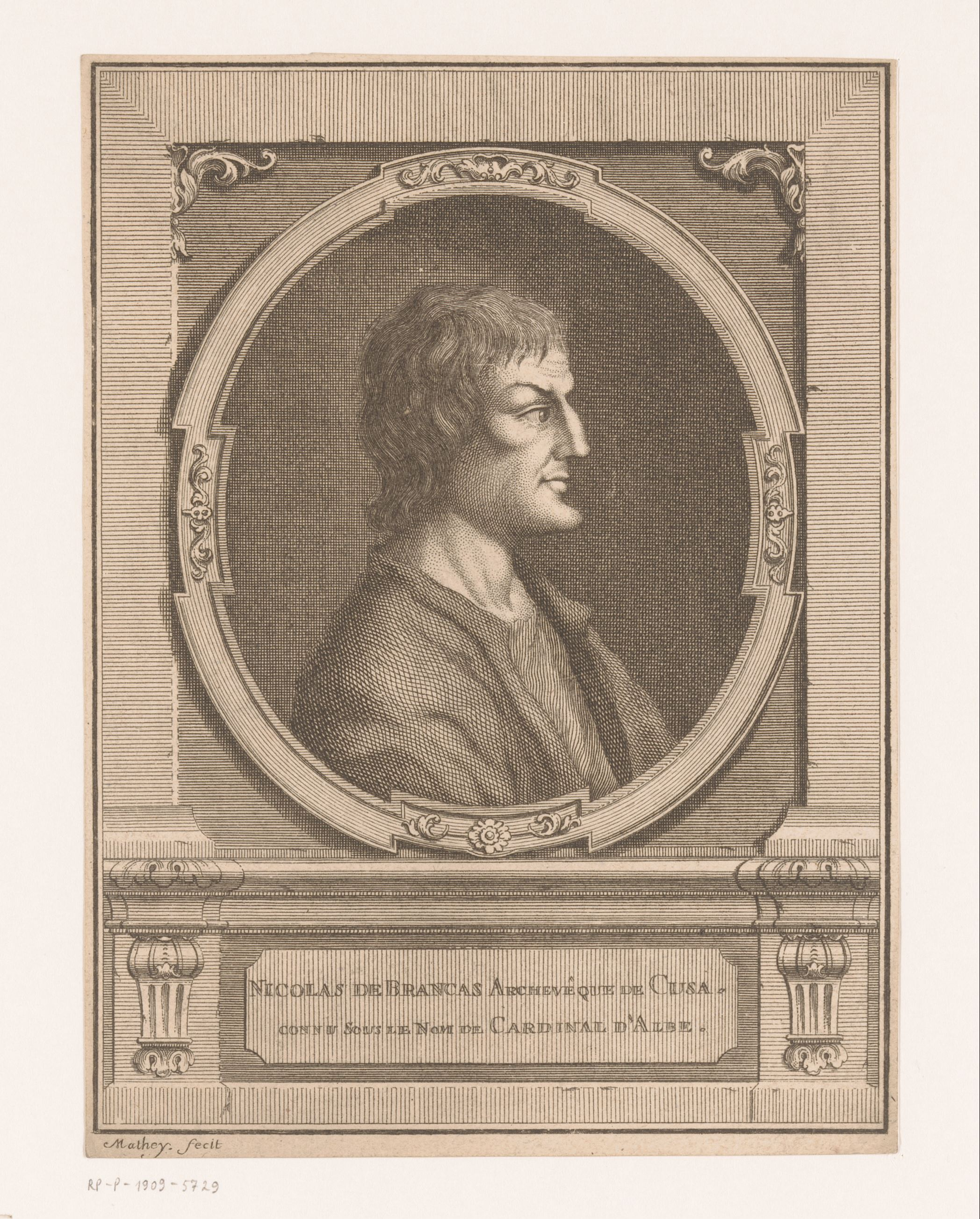
- Church: Santa Maria in Trastevere (1378-1390)
- Archdiocese: Bari (1367-1377); Cosenza (1377-1378)
- Diocese: Suburbicarian Diocese of Albano (1390-1412)

Orders
- Ordination: by Cardinal Louis de Bar
- Created cardinal: 16 December 1378 by Pope Clement VII
- Rank: Cardinal Priest, then Cardinal Bishop

Personal details
- Born: c. 1335-1340 Naples IT
- Died: 29 June 1412 Florence IT
- Buried: Santa Maria Nuova; Florence
- Residence: Bari, Naples, Avignon
- Parents: Marino Brancaccio; Giacoma d'Aversa
- Occupation: diplomat, administrator
- Profession: bishop
- Education: Doctor of Civil Law (Naples ?)

Niccolò Brancaccio (Brancas, in French) (c. 1335/1340 – 29 June 1412) was born in the Kingdom of Naples, perhaps in Naples itself. He was Archbishop of Bari and then Archbishop of Cosenza, while serving in the Roman Curia in Avignon. He became a cardinal of the Avignon Obedience in 1378, and was Cardinal Priest of Santa Maria in Trastevere and then Cardinal Bishop of Albano. He participated in the Council of Pisa in 1409, and was one of the electors of Pope Alexander V and of Pope John XXIII.

== Biography ==
Niccolò was the son of Marino Brancaccio and Giacoma d'Aversa. His elder brother Francesco "Fusco" was Signore di Laviano e Trentola, and his younger brother was Baffilo Brancaccio, Count of Anagni and Marshal of the Holy Roman Church. They were relatives of Bartolomeo Prignano (Pope Urban VI), on their mother's side of the family.

=== Early career ===
He obtained the degree of Doctor of Civil Law, probably from the University of Naples, and was given a Canonry in the Cathedral Chapter of Naples. He was named a papal chaplain (Monsignor) and Auditor Causarum Sacri Palatii (judge). He took his oath of office on 29 May 1366.

He was appointed Archbishop of Bari on 12 April 1367 by Pope Urban V. He became an intimate advisor of Queen Joanna I of Naples. He was transferred to the diocese of Cosenza on 13 January 1377 by Pope Gregory XI; his successor as Archbishop of Bari was Bartolomeo Prignano, who became Urban VI.

In April 1377, Brancaccio, Archbishop of Cosenza, and Matteo da Gesualdo were sent by Queen Joanna of Naples on a mission to the Signoria in Florence, to attempt to mediate in the war between Pope Gregory XI and the Florentine Republic. The embassy was not a success.

Niccolò was in Naples when Prignano became pope in April 1378, and he was one of the ambassadors sent by the Queen to salute Urban as the new pope. When he had returned to Naples and heard that Robert of Geneva had been elected Pope Clement VII at Fondi on 20 September, the Queen and he immediately changed their obedience and supported Clement. In a deposition on the Schism, the Archbishop of Cosenza remarks that the Queen had no personal reason to prefer Robert of Geneva. Quite the contrary, there had been dissension between Robert and the cardinal of Bologna, the Queen's uncle. But the Archbishop of Cosenza was immediately sent on an embassy to Clement VII.

=== Cardinal ===
Niccolò Brancaccio was named a cardinal by Pope Clement VII in his first Consistory for the promotion of cardinals on 16 December 1378, and was assigned the titular church of Santa Maria in Trastevere. At the time of his promotion he held the office of Regens Cancellarium, making him second-in-command to Cardinal Pierre de Monteruc, the Vice-Chancellor. In 1379 Pope Clement named Niccolò a Canon of the Cathedral Chapter of Lyon. Another of his benefices was the Priory of Luneil le Vieil. In 1379 Niccolò moved to Avignon along with the Papal Curia and Pope Clement.

Following the death of Pope Clement VII on Wednesday, 16 September 1394, Cardinal Brancaccio was one of twenty-one cardinals who gathered in Conclave to elect a successor. The Conclave opened on Saturday, 26 September 1394, and concluded on Monday, 28 September 1394, with the election of Cardinal Pedro de Luna, who took the name of Benedict XIII.

On 1 March 1388 in Le Mans, Cardinal Brancaccio participated in the signing of the marriage contract between Louis II, King of Sicily, and Yolanda, daughter of the King of Aragon. On 18 April 1388 Cardinal Anglico Grimoard, Suburbicarian Bishop of Albano, died, and he was succeeded (c. 1390, according to Eubel) by Cardinal Brancaccio.

=== Trouble with Benedict XIII ===
On 1 September 1398 at Villeneuve eighteen cardinals, among them Niccolò Brancaccio, published the retraction of their obedience to Benedict XIII. A few weeks later, after negotiations with the pontiff, they returned to their obedience.

On 29 June 1408, thirteen cardinals (who held the proxies of two additional cardinals) met in the port city of Livorno in Italy, where they prepared a manifesto, in which they pledged themselves to summon a general council of the Church to solve the problem of the Great Western Schism. One of them was Niccolò Brancaccio, Cardinal Bishop of Albano. When the Council finally met on 25 March 1409, Brancaccio was a prominent member of the Council. When the vote was called for on 10 May 1409 in the matter of deposing and anathematizing Benedict XIII and Gregory XII, the vote was nearly unanimous, except for Cardinal Guy de Malsec and Cardinal Niccolò Brancaccio, who asked for more time to consider. The sentence was finally read on 5 June.

=== Conclaves ===
Brancaccio was one of the twenty-four cardinals who took part in the Conclave that was held during the Council, from 15 June to 26 June 1409. Cardinal Pietro Filargo was elected, and chose the name Alexander V. Unfortunately he survived only 10½ months, but during that time, in a gesture intended to heal the wounds of the schism, he issued a papal decree legitimizing all of the cardinals of all the obediences.

The Conclave to elect his successor took place in Bologna from 15 to 17 May 1410, and again Niccolò Brancaccio was one of the seventeen cardinals who participated. The Neapolitan Cardinal Baldassare Cossa was elected, and chose the name John XXIII.

Cardinal Niccolò Brancaccio died in Florence on 29 June 1412, and was buried in the church of Santa Maria Novella.

== Bibliography ==
- Baluze, Étienne (Stephanus) (1693). Vitae Paparum Avenionensis: hoc est, historia pontificum romanorum qui in Gallia sederunt do anno Christi MCCCV usque ad annum MCCCXCIV (in Latin). Vol. Tomus primus. Paris: apud Franciscum Muguet. pp. 1256–1259.
- Cardella, Lorenzo (1793). Memorie storiche de'cardinali della santa Romana chiesa (in Italian). Vol. Tomo secondo. Roma: Pagliarini. pp. 351–352.
- Chacón (Ciaconius), Alfonso (1677). A. Oldoino (ed.). Vitae, et res gestae pontificum Romanorum et s.r.e. cardinalium (in Latin). Vol. Tomus secundus. Roma: P. & A. de Rubeis (Rossi). p. 676.
- Eubel, Conradus, ed. (1913). Hierarchia catholica medii aevi. Vol. Tomus 1 (second ed.). Münster: Libreria Regensbergiana.
- Valois, Noël (1896). La France et le grand schisme d'Occident: Le schisme sous Charles V. Le schisme sous Charles VI jusqu'à la mort de Clément VII (in French). Vol. Tome premier. Paris: A. Picard et fils.
- Valois, Noël (1901). La France et le grand schisme d'Occident: Efforts de La France pour obtenir l'abdication des deux pontifes rivaux (in French). Paris: A. Picard et fils.
- Valois, Noël (1902). La France et le grand schisme d'Occident: Recours au Concile général (in French). Vol. Tome IV. Paris: A. Picard et fils. pp. 9. 13–14, 36–37, 99, 104, 139, 177, 197.

=== External links ===
- Girgensohn, Dieter, "Brancaccio, Niccolò," in: Dizionario Biografico degli Italiani Volume 13 (1971).
