= Amedeo di Saluzzo =

Amedeo di Saluzzo (1361 – 28 June 1419) was a cardinal during the Western Schism. He was born as the second son of Frederick II, Marquess of Saluzzo and Beatrice of Geneva. He was nephew of Avignon Pope Clement VII on his mother's side. Saluzzo was appointed as Bishop of Valence and Die at 4 November 1383. In less than two months he was elevated as a cardinal-nephew by Clement VII, becoming Cardinal-Deacon of Santa Maria Nuova. In 1403 he was appointed as Camerlengo of the Sacred College of Cardinals. He abandoned Antipope Benedict XIII after having been deposed by him on 21 October 1408. Then Saluzzo participated in the Council of Pisa, which elected Alexander V as pope. He also campaigned for the Council of Constance, and there, he attended the conclave of Pope Martin V. During the Council, alongside Robert Hallam and Nicholas Bubwith, he ordered a Latin translation and commentary of Dante's Divine Comedy executed by Giovanni da Serravalle. After the end of the Western Schism, Saluzzo kept his position as Camerlengo until his death in 1419.
