= Sabiñán =

Coordinates: 41°26′35″N 1°34′05″W

Sabiñán, Spain
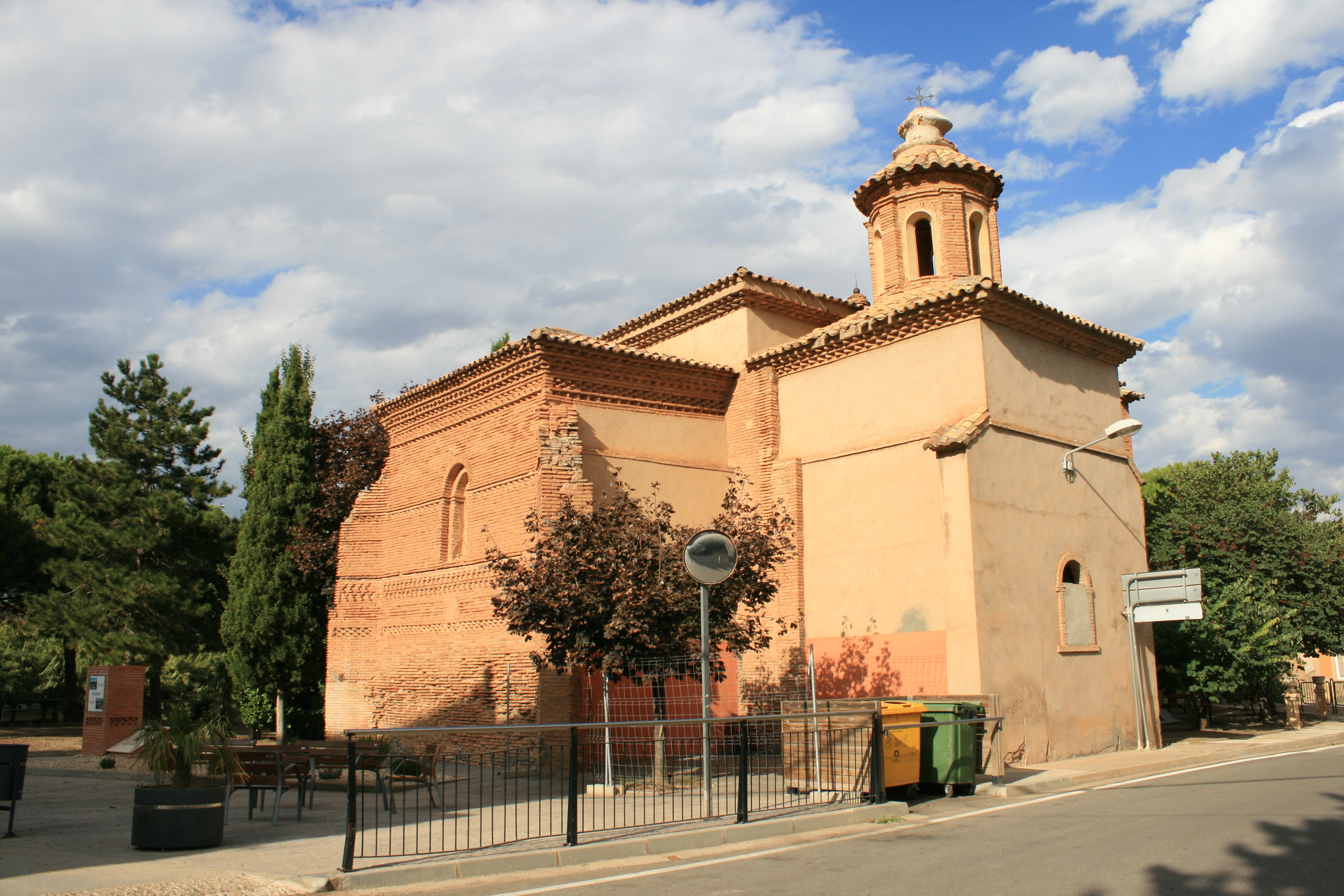
- Church of Sabiñán

- Coat of arms
- Interactive map of Sabiñán, Spain
- Country: Spain
- Autonomous community: Aragon
- Province: Zaragoza
- Municipality: Sabiñán

Area
  - Total: 15 km^{2} (5.8 sq mi)

Population (2025-01-01)
  - Total: 697
  - Density: 46/km^{2} (120/sq mi)
- Time zone: UTC+1 (CET)
  - Summer (DST): UTC+2 (CEST)

Sabiñán is a municipality located in the province of Zaragoza, Aragon, Spain. According to the 2004 census (INE), the municipality has a population of 809 inhabitants.

== See also ==
- List of municipalities in Zaragoza
