= Antipope John XXIII =

Italian bishop and Pisan antipope from 1410 to 1415

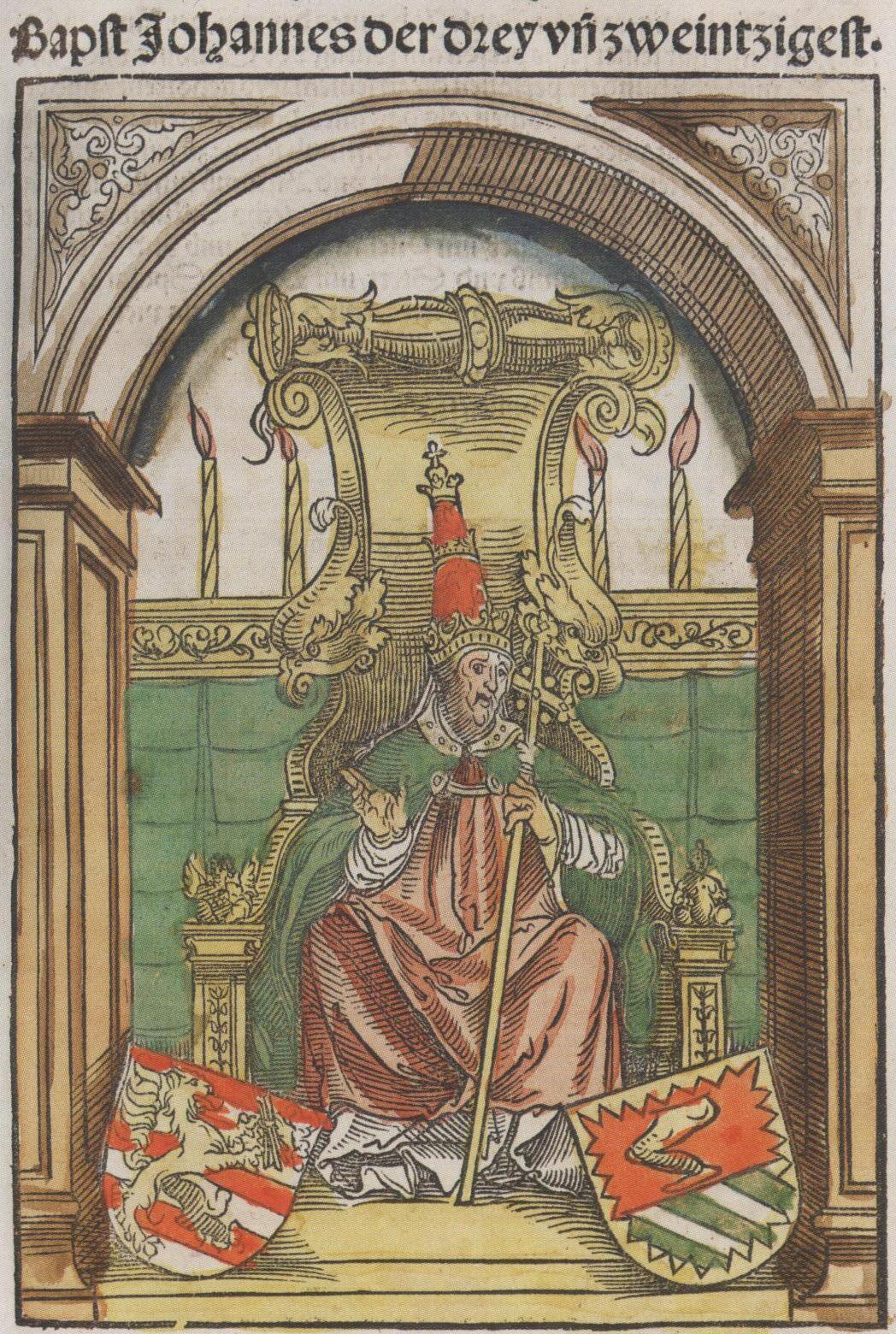
- Miniature from the Chronicle of the Council of Constance by Ulrich of Richenthal
- Elected: 17 May 1410
- Papacy began: 25 May 1410
- Papacy ended: 29 May 1415
- Predecessor: Roman claimant: Gregory XII; Antipapal claimant: Pisan; Alexander V Avignonian; Benedict XIII
- Successor: Roman claimant: Gregory XII; Antipapal claimant: Avignonian; Benedict XIII; Florentine; Felix V
- Opposed to: Roman claimant: Pope Gregory XII; Antipapal (Avignon) claimant: Antipope Benedict XIII

Orders
- Ordination: 24 May 1410 by Jean-Allarmet de Brogny
- Consecration: 25 May 1410 by Jean-Allarmet de Brogny
- Created cardinal: 27 February 1402 by Pope Boniface IX
- Rank: Cardinal-Deacon

Personal details
- Born: Baldassarre Cossa Procida, Kingdom of Naples
- Died: November 1419 Florence, Republic of Florence
- Buried: Tomb of Antipope John XXIII
- Education: University of Bologna
- Coat of arms

Baldassarre Cossa (died November 1419) was Pisan antipope as John XXIII (1410–1415) during the Western Schism. The Catholic Church today regards him as an antipope in opposition to Pope Gregory XII, whom it recognizes as the rightful successor of Saint Peter. John XXIII was also an opponent of Benedict XIII, who was recognized by the French clergy and monarchy as the legitimate pope.

Historically, the Annuario Pontificio recognized John XXIII the legitimate successor of Saint Peter. However, the Western Schism was reinterpreted in 1958 when Pope John XXIII chose to reuse the ordinal XXIII, which is now reflected in modern editions of the Annuario Pontificio. John XXIII is now considered to be an antipope and Gregory XII's reign is recognized to have extended until 1415.

Cossa was born in the Kingdom of Naples. In 1403, he served as a papal legate in Romagna. He participated in the Council of Pisa in 1408, which sought to end the Western Schism with the election of a third alternative pope. In 1410, he succeeded Antipope Alexander V, taking the name John XXIII. At the instigation of King Sigismund of Germany, John XXIII called the Council of Constance of 1413, which deposed both John XXIII and Benedict XIII, accepted Gregory XII's resignation, and elected Pope Martin V to replace them, thus ending the schism. John XXIII was tried for various crimes, though later accounts question the veracity of those accusations. Towards the end of his life, Cossa restored his relationship with the Church and was made Cardinal Bishop of Frascati by Pope Martin V.

== Early life ==
Baldassarre Cossa was born on the island of Procida in the Kingdom of Naples, the son of Giovanni Cossa, lord of Procida. Initially he followed a military career, taking part in the Angevin-Neapolitan war. His two brothers were sentenced to death for piracy by Ladislaus of Naples.

He studied law at the University of Bologna and obtained doctorates in both civil and canon law. Probably at the prompting of his family, in 1392 he entered the service of Pope Boniface IX, first working in Bologna and then in Rome. (The Western Schism had begun in 1378, and there were two competing popes at the time, one in Avignon supported by France and Spain, and one in Rome, supported by most of Italy, Germany and England.) In 1386 he is listed as canon of the cathedral of Bologna. In 1396, he became archdeacon in Bologna. He became Cardinal deacon of Saint Eustachius in 1402 and Papal legate in Romagna in 1403. Johann Peter Kirsch describes Cossa as "utterly worldly-minded, ambitious, crafty, unscrupulous, and immoral, a good soldier but no churchman". At this time Cossa also had some links with local robber bands, which were often used to intimidate his rivals and attack carriages. These connections added to his influence and power in the region.

== Role in the Western Schism ==
=== Council of Pisa ===
Cardinal Cossa was one of the seven cardinals who, in May 1408, withdrew their allegiance from Pope Gregory XII, stating that he had broken his solemn oath not to create new cardinals without consulting them in advance. In company with those cardinals who had been following Antipope Benedict XIII of Avignon, they convened the Council of Pisa, of which Cossa became a leading figure. The aim of the council was to end the schism; to this end they deposed both Gregory XII and Benedict XIII and elected a new pope Alexander V in 1409. Gregory and Benedict ignored this decision, however, so that there were now three simultaneous claimants to the papacy.

=== Election to the papacy ===
Alexander suddenly died while he was with Cardinal Baldassare Cossa at Bologna on the night of 3–4 May 1410. On 25 May 1410, Cossa was consecrated a pope taking the name John XXIII. He had become an ordained bishop only one day earlier. John XXIII was acknowledged as pope by France, England, Bohemia, Portugal, parts of the Holy Roman Empire, and numerous Northern Italian city states, including Florence and Venice and the Patriarchate of Aquileia; and in the beginning and in 1411–1413 by Hungary and Poland. However, the Avignon Pope Benedict XIII was regarded as pope by the crowns of Kingdoms of Aragon and Castile, and the kingdoms of Sicily and Scotland. Gregory XII was still favored by Ladislaus of Naples, Carlo I Malatesta, the princes of Bavaria, Louis III, Elector Palatine, and parts of Germany and Poland. John XXIII made the Medici Bank the bank of the papacy, contributing considerably to the family's wealth and prestige.

The main enemy of John was Ladislaus of Naples, who protected Gregory XII in Rome. Following his election as pope, John spent a year in Bologna and then joined forces with Louis II of Anjou to march against Ladislaus. An initial victory proved short-lived and Ladislaus retook Rome in May 1413, forcing John to flee to Florence. In Florence he met Sigismund, King of the Romans. Sigismund wanted to end the schism and urged John to call a general council. John did so with hesitation, at first trying to have the council held in Italy (rather than in a German Imperial City, as Sigismund wanted). The Council of Constance was convened on 30 October 1414. During the third session, rival Pope Gregory XII authorized the council as well. The council resolved that all three popes should abdicate and a new pope be elected.

=== Flight from the Council of Constance ===
In March, John escaped from Constance disguised as a postman. According to the Klingenberger Chronicle, written by a noble client of Frederick IV, Duke of Austria, John XXIII traveled down the Rhine to Schaffhausen in a boat, while Frederick accompanied him with a small band of men on horseback. There was a huge outcry in Constance when it was discovered that John had fled, and Sigismund was furious about this setback to his plans for ending the Schism. The King of the Romans issued orders to all the powers on the Upper Rhine and in Swabia stating that he had declared Frederick to be an outlaw and that his lands and possessions were forfeit. In due course this led to a great deal of political upheaval and many Austrian losses in the region, notably in Aargau to the Swiss Confederation.

In the meantime, Antipope John XXIII and Frederick fled further downriver along the Rhine to the town of Freiburg im Breisgau, which recognised the duke of Austria as its lord. There Sigismund's lieutenant Ludwig III, Elector Palatine caught up with them. He convinced Frederick that he stood to lose too much by harbouring the fugitive pope, and the Austrian duke agreed to give himself and John up and return to Constance.

=== Deposition ===
During his absence, John was deposed by the council, and upon his return he was tried for heresy, simony, schism and immorality, and found guilty on all counts. The 18th-century historian Edward Gibbon wrote, "The more scandalous charges were suppressed; the vicar of Christ was accused only of piracy, rape, sodomy, murder and incest." John was given over to Ludwig III, Elector Palatine, who imprisoned him for several months in Heidelberg and Mannheim.

The last remaining claimant in Avignon, Benedict XIII, refused to resign and was excommunicated. Martin V was elected as new pope in 1417.

== Death and burial ==
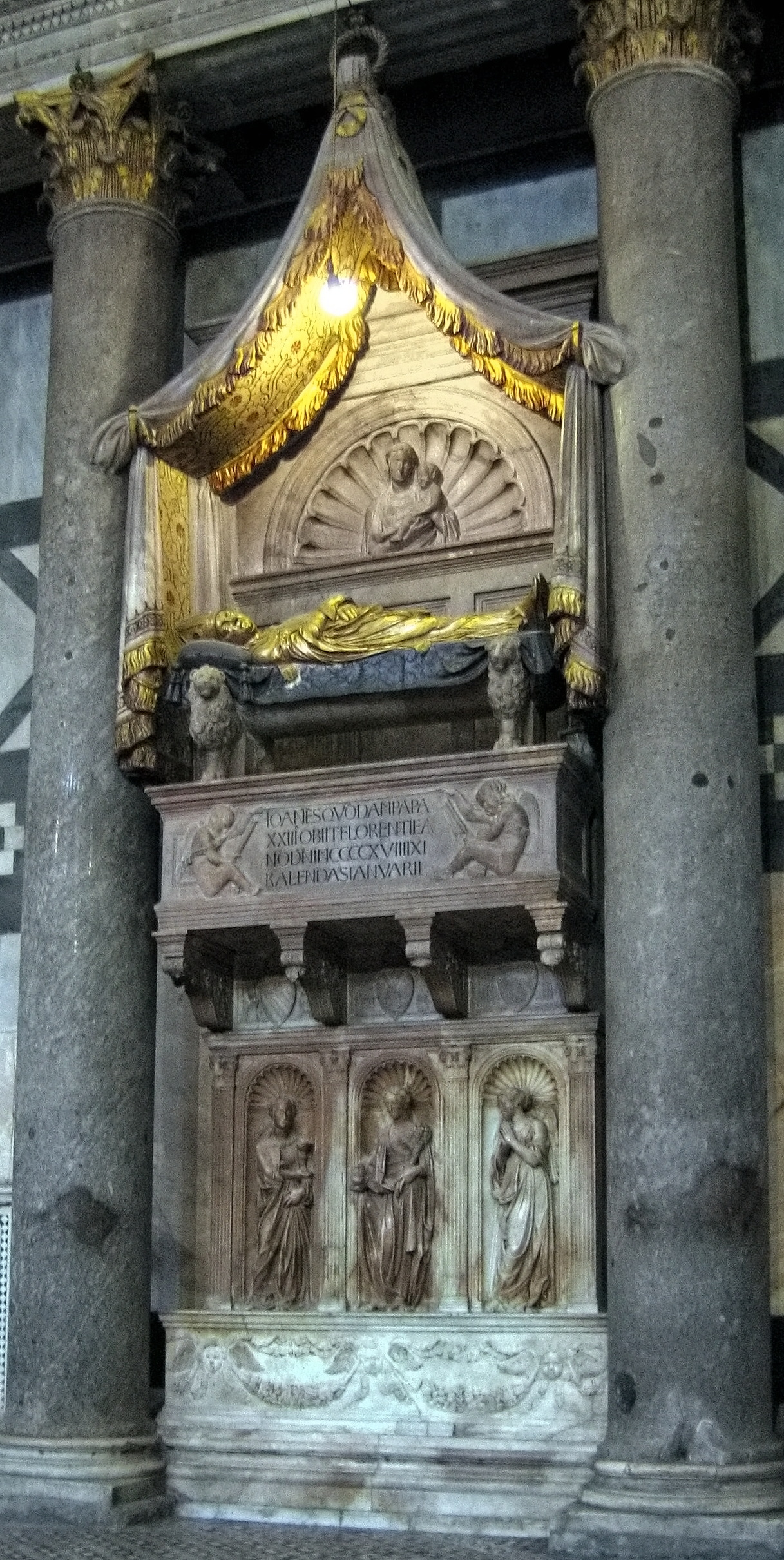
Tomb of Antipope John XXIII

Cossa was freed in 1418, after a heavy ransom was paid by the Medici. He went to Florence, where he submitted to Martin V, who made him Cardinal Bishop of Frascati. Cossa died in November 1419.

The Medici oversaw the construction of his magnificent tomb by Donatello and Michelozzo in the Battistero di San Giovanni in Florence. Pope Martin V protested in vain against the inscription on the sarcophagus: "John the former pope".

J.P. Kirsch remarks that "Undeniably secular and ambitious, his moral life was not above reproach, and his unscrupulous methods in no wise accorded with the requirements of his high office ... the heinous crimes of which his opponents in the council accused him were certainly gravely exaggerated." One historian concluded that John was "a great man in temporal things, but a complete failure and worthless in spiritual things".

== Numbering issues ==
He should not be confused with Pope John XXIII of the twentieth century. When Cardinal Angelo Roncalli, the Patriarch of Venice, was elected pope in 1958, there was some confusion as to whether he would be John XXIII or John XXIV. Roncalli then declared that he was to be "John XXIII" to put this question to rest. There was no John XX, since that number was skipped due to an error by Medieval Pope John XXI; this is why Gibbon refers to the antipope John as "John XXII".

== See also ==
- Papal selection before 1059
- Papal conclave (since 1274)

== Sources ==
- Greenblatt, Stephen (2011). The Swerve: How the World Became Modern. W.W. Norton. ISBN 978-0393343403.
- Kirsch, Johann Peter (1910). "John XXIII". The Catholic Encyclopedia. Robert Appleton Company.
- Levillain, Philippe, ed. (2002). "John XXIII". The Papacy: An Encyclopedia. Vol. 2: Gaius-Proxies. Routledge.
- Poole, Reginald Lane (1911). Wycliffe and Movements for Reform. Longmans, Green and Co.
- Rollo-Koster, Joëlle (2022). The Great Western Schism, 1378-1417: Performing Legitimacy, Performing Unity. Cambridge University Press. ISBN 9781107168947.
- Schüssler, Rudolf (2013). "Business Morality at the Dawn of Modernity: The Cases of Angelo Corbinelli and Cosimo De' Medici". In Schweiger, Cornelia; Müller, Sigrid (eds.). Between Creativity and Norm-making: Tensions in the Later Middle Ages and the Early Modern Era. Brill. pp. 131–148. ISBN 978-9004240681.
