= Antipope Benedict XIII =

Antipope from 1394 to 1423

- Pope Luna
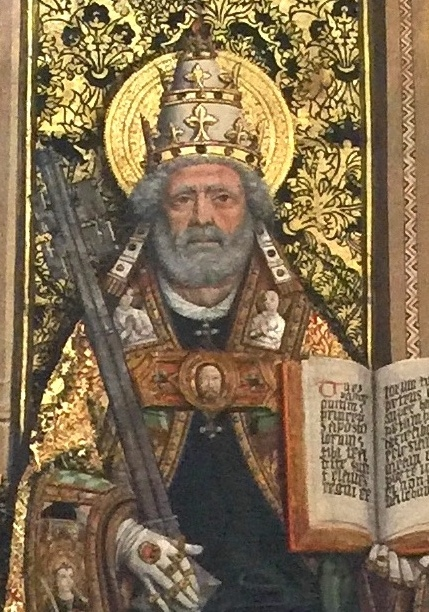
- Portrait by Juan Rexach (15th-century, Morella, Spain)
- Elected: 28 September 1394
- Papacy began: 11 October 1394
- Quashed: 12 March 1403
- Papacy ended: 23 May 1423
- Predecessor: Roman claimant: Boniface IX; Innocent VII; Gregory XII; Martin V; Antipapal (Avignonian) claimant: Clement VII
- Successor: Roman claimant: Martin V; Antipapal (Avignonian) claimant: Clement VIII
- Opposed to: Roman claimants: Boniface IX; Innocent VII; Gregory XII; Martin V; Pisan claimants: Alexander V; John XXIII
- Other post: Cardinal-Deacon of Santa Maria in Cosmedin
- Previous post: Apostolic Administrator of Avignon (1394–1398)

Orders
- Ordination: 3 October 1394 by Jean de Neufchatel
- Consecration: 11 October 1394 by Jean de Neufchatel
- Created cardinal: 20 December 1375 by Pope Gregory XI
- Rank: Cardinal-Deacon

Personal details
- Born: Pedro Martínez de Luna y Pérez de Gotor; 1342 Illueca, Crown of Aragon
- Died: 23 May 1423 (aged 80–81) Peníscola, Kingdom of Valencia, Crown of Aragon
- Buried: Castillo Palacio del Papa Luna, Illueca (skull)
- Occupation: Professor
- Profession: Canon law
- Education: University of Montpellier
- Coat of arms: Benedict XIII's coat of arms

Pedro Martínez de Luna y Pérez de Gotor (1342 – 23 May 1423), known as el Papa Luna or Pope Luna, was an Aragonese nobleman who was antipope with the regnal name Benedict XIII during the Western Schism.

== Early life ==
Pedro Martínez de Luna was born at Illueca, Kingdom of Aragon (part of modern Spain), in 1342. He belonged to the de Luna family, who were part of the Aragonese nobility. He studied law at the University of Montpellier, where he obtained his doctorate and later taught canon law. His knowledge of canon law, noble lineage, and austere way of life won him the approval of Pope Gregory XI, who appointed de Luna to the position of Cardinal Deacon of Santa Maria in Cosmedin on 20 December 1375.

== Avignon election ==
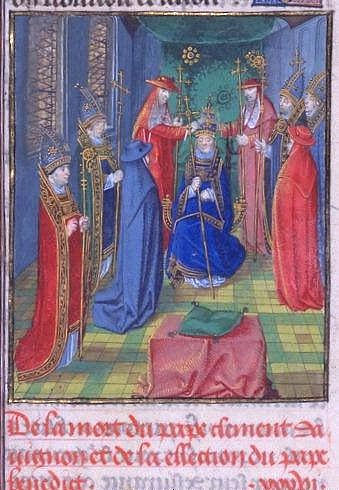
The consecration of Benedict XIII

In 1377, Pedro de Luna and the other cardinals returned to Rome with Pope Gregory, who had been persuaded to leave his papal base at Avignon. (Note: The pope was repeatedly urged by Catherine of Siena. Other considerations were the repeated embassies sent by the Roman people, and the war of Florence against the cities of the Papal States.) After Gregory's death on 27 March 1378, the people of Rome feared that the cardinals would elect a French pope and return the papacy to Avignon. Consequently, they rioted and laid siege to the cardinals, insisting on an Italian pope. The conclave duly elected Bartolomeo Prignano, Archbishop of Bari, as Urban VI on 9 April, but the new pope proved to be intractably hostile to the cardinals. Some of them reconvened at Fondi in September 1378, declared the earlier election invalid and elected Robert of Geneva as their new pope, initiating the Western Schism. Robert assumed the name Clement VII and moved back to Avignon.

Clement VII sent de Luna as legate to Spain for the Kingdoms of Castile, Aragon, Navarre, and Portugal, in order to win them over to the obedience of the Avignon pope. Owing to his powerful relations, his influence in the Province of Aragon was very great. In 1393, Clement VII appointed him legate to France, Brabant, Flanders, Scotland, England, and Ireland. As such he stayed principally in Paris, but he did not confine his activities to those countries that belonged to the Avignon obedience. Following Clement's death on 16 September 1394, the cardinals met at Avignon. The conclave consisted of 11 French cardinals, eight Italians, four Spaniards, and one from Savoy, all proclaiming the ardent wish to reunite the church. The cardinals then elected Luna as the new pope, on the condition that he should labor to quell the schism, and should resign the papal dignity whenever the pope of Rome should do the same, or the college of cardinals demand it.

In ■ orange, the kingdoms subject to the Avignon papacy.

On the death of Urban VI in 1389, the Roman College of Cardinals had chosen Boniface IX; the election of Benedict therefore perpetuated the Western Schism. At the start of his term of office, de Luna was recognised as pope by France, Scotland, Sicily, Castile, Aragon and Navarre. In 1396, Benedict sent Sanchez Muñoz, one of the most loyal members of the Avignon curia, as an envoy to the Bishop of Valencia to bolster support for the Avignon-based papacy in the Crown of Aragon.

== Avignon papacy ==
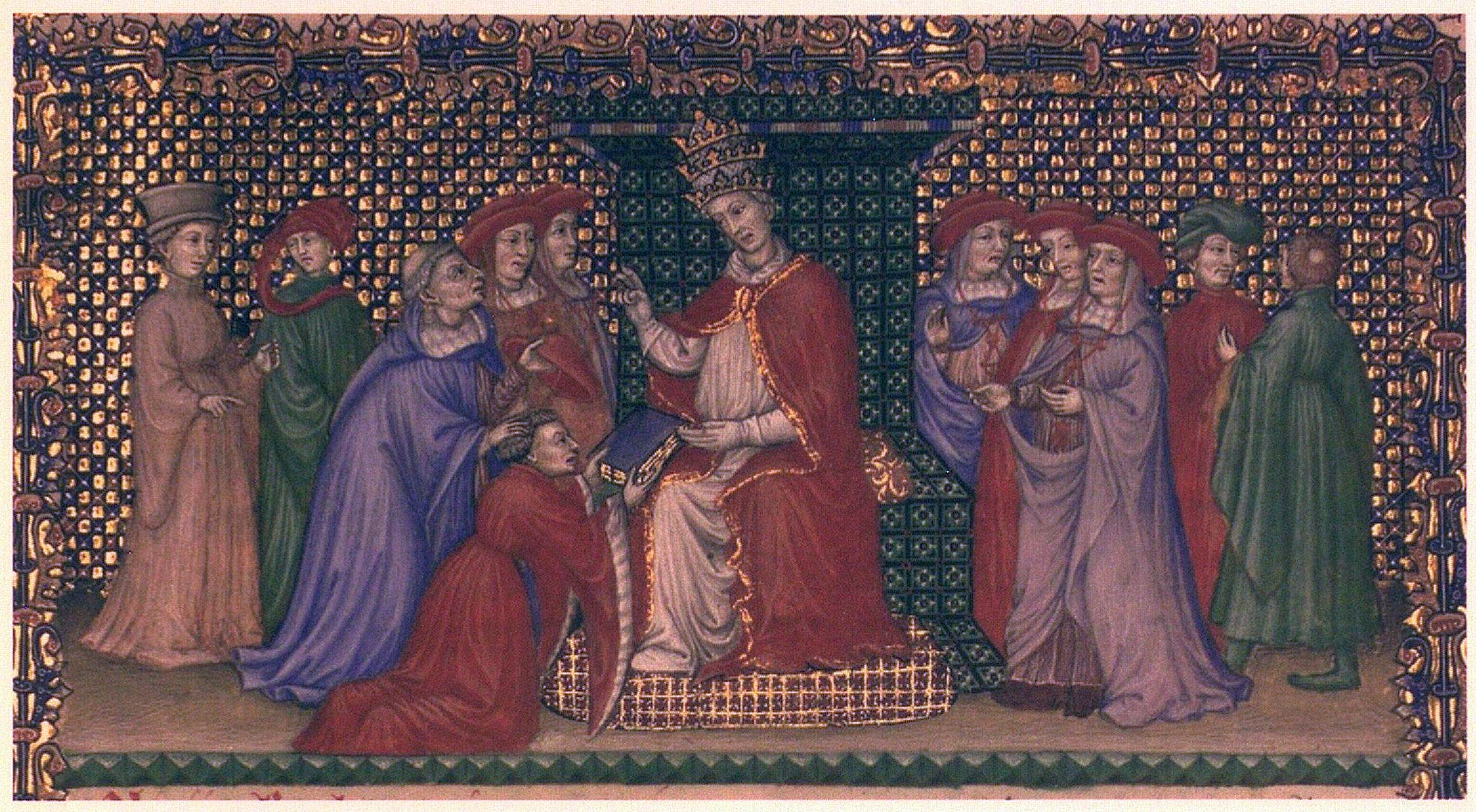
14th-century illustration from a manuscript of Pliny’s Epistulae

In 1398, the Kingdom of France withdrew its recognition of the Avignon anti-popes. Benedict was abandoned by 17 of his cardinals, with only five remaining faithful to him. Benedict's rationale for continuing the rivalry lay in the fact that he was the last living cardinal created by Gregory XI, the last undoubted pope. As the only unquestioned cardinal, Benedict argued, he was, by right and by canon law, the only qualified candidate left who could validly claim the papacy. Following the Council of Constance, Benedict's logic was not widely accepted.

An army led by Geoffrey Boucicaut, brother of Jean Boucicaut, occupied Avignon and started a five-year siege of the Papal Palace which ended when Benedict managed to escape from Avignon on 12 March 1403. He sought shelter in the territory of Louis II of Anjou. Avignon immediately submitted again to him, and his cardinals likewise recognized him. Popular sentiment being again in his favor, he was recognized as the legitimate pope by France, Scotland, Castile and Sicily.

After the Roman Pope Innocent VII died in 1406, the newly elected Roman pope, Gregory XII, started negotiations with Benedict, suggesting that they both resign so a new pope could be elected to reunite the Catholic Church. When these talks ended in stalemate in 1408, Charles VI of France declared that his kingdom was neutral to both papal contenders. Charles helped to organise the Council of Pisa in 1409. This council was supposed to arrange for both Gregory and Benedict to resign, so that a new universally recognised pope could be elected. To oppose this, Benedict convoked the Council of Perpignan but with little success. Since both Benedict and Gregory refused to abdicate, the only achievement in Pisa was that a third candidate to the Holy See was put forward: Peter Philarghi, who assumed the name Alexander V.

=== University of St Andrews ===
The arms of St Andrews keep a crescent, canting arms of the Luna family (Spanish: luna, lit. 'moon').

A group of Augustinian clergy, driven from the University of Paris by the Schism and from the universities of Oxford and Cambridge by the Anglo-Scottish Wars, formed a society of higher learning in St Andrews, Fife, Scotland in 1410. The Bishop of St Andrews, Henry Wardlaw, then successfully petitioned Benedict to grant the school university status by issuing a series of papal bulls, which followed on 28 August 1413. Having lost the support of France and driven out from Avignon, Benedict by then had taken refuge in Perpignan, on the Principality of Catalonia's northern border of the Crown of Aragon, but Scotland was among the handful of supporters that remained loyal. Nowadays, the University of St Andrews's coat of arms/emblem still incorporates that of Benedict.

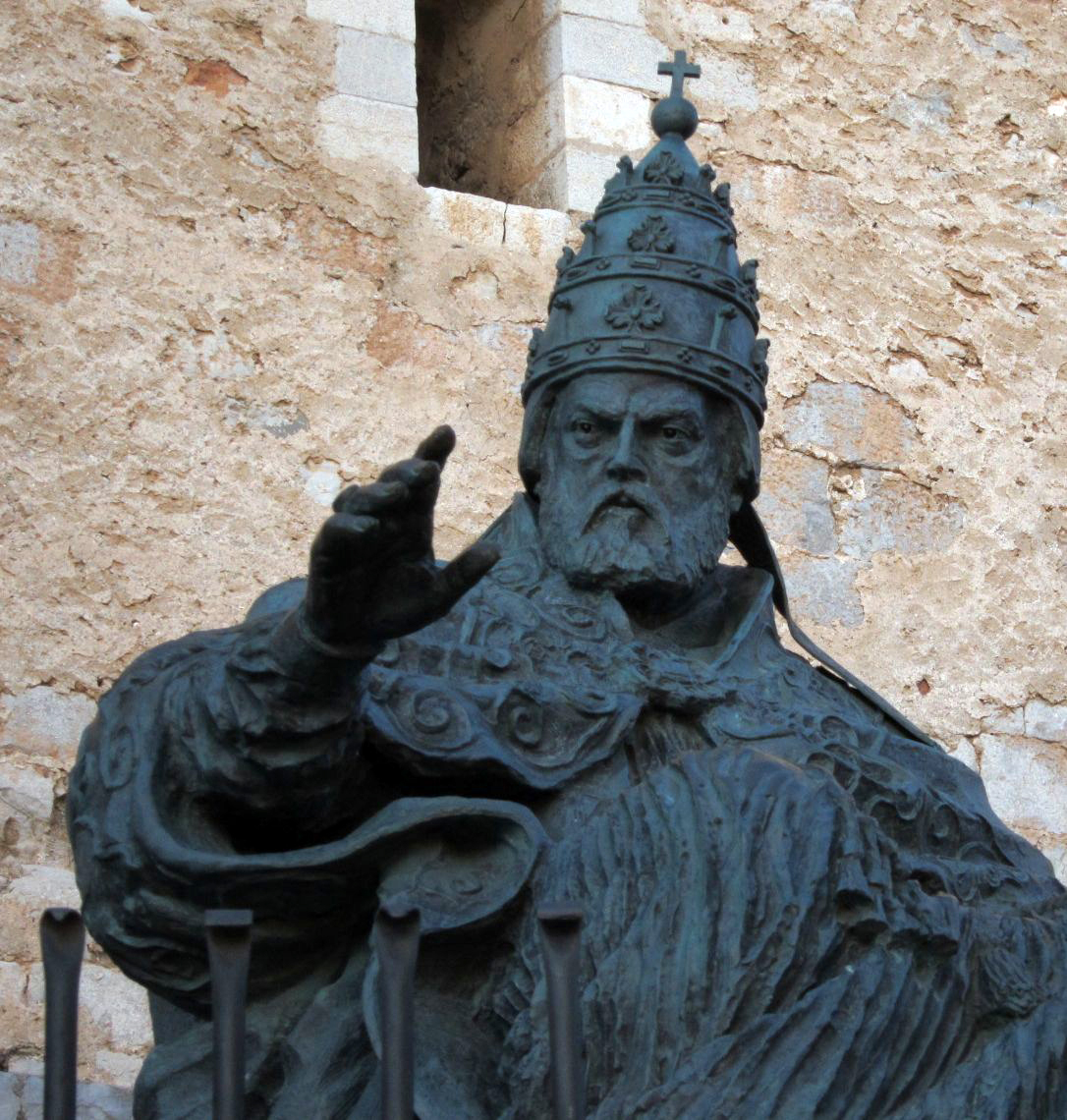
Statue of Benedict XIII in Peníscola, Spain.

=== Etsi doctoribus gentium ===
In part to bolster faltering support for his papacy, Benedict initiated the year-long Disputation of Tortosa (Catalonia) in 1413, which became the most prominent Christian–Jewish disputation of the Middle Ages. Two years later Benedict issued the papal bull Etsi doctoribus gentium which was one of the most complete collections of anti-Jewish laws. Synagogues were closed, Jewish goldsmiths were forbidden to produce Christian sacred objects such as chalices and crucifixes and Jewish book binders were forbidden to bind books which included the names of Jesus or Mary. Those laws were repealed by Pope Martin V, after he received a mission of Jews, sent by the famous synod convoked by the Jews in Forlì, in 1418.

=== Council of Constance ===
In 1415, the Council of Constance brought this clash between papal claimants to an end. Gregory XII agreed to resign, and Baldassare Cossa, who had succeeded Philarghi as the Pisan papal contender in 1410 and had assumed the name John XXIII, tried to flee and was deposed during his absence, being subsequently tried upon his return. Benedict, on the other hand, refused to stand down.

Finally, Emperor Sigismund organised a European summit in Perpignan, to convince Benedict to resign his office and end the Western Schism. On 20 September 1415, the Emperor met with Benedict at the Palace of the Kings of Majorca, accompanied by King Ferdinand I of Aragon, delegates of the counts of Foix, Provence, Savoy, and Lorraine, embassies from the kings of France, England, Hungary, Castile, and Navarre, and the Church's representative at the Council of Constance. Benedict still refused to resign, clashing with the Emperor, who left Perpignan on 5 November.

Because of this stubbornness, the Council of Constance declared Benedict a schismatic and excommunicated him from the Catholic Church on 27 July 1417, and elected Martin V as the new consensual pope on 11 November 1417. Benedict, who had lived in Perpignan, in the Principality of Catalonia, from 1408 to 1417, now fled to the Peníscola Castle, near Tortosa, in the Kingdom of Valencia. He still considered himself the true Pope. His claim was now only recognised in the Crown of Aragon, where he was given protection by King Alfonso V. Benedict remained at Peníscola from 1417 until his death there on 23 May 1423.

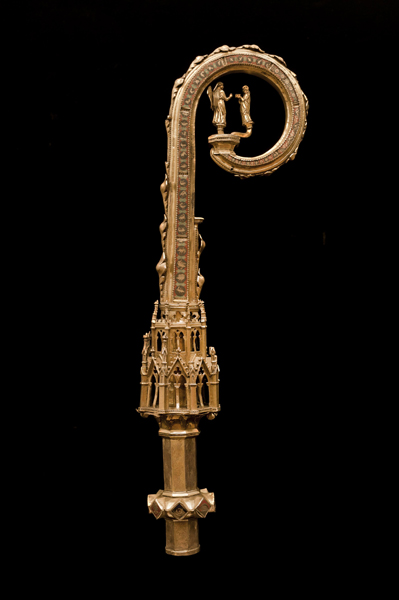
Crozier of Pope Luna, Museo Arqueológico Nacional, Spain.

=== Succession ===
The day before his death, Benedict appointed four cardinals of proven loyalty to ensure the succession of another pope who would remain faithful to the now beleaguered Avignon line. Three of these cardinals met on 10 June 1423 and elected Sanchez Muñoz as their new pope, with Muñoz assuming the papal name of Clement VIII, whose claim was still recognised by Aragon. The fourth cardinal, Jean Carrier, the archdeacon of Rodez near Toulouse, was absent at this conclave and disputed its validity, whereupon Carrier, acting as a sort of one man College of Cardinals, proceeded to elect Bernard Garnier, the sacristan of Rodez, as pope. Garnier took the name Benedict XIV.

When, in 1429, an agreement between Rome and Aragon was reached, Clement VIII abdicated in favour of recognising Pope Martin V, terminating the Avignon line of anti-popes. In return, he was appointed as bishop of Majorca.

== Burials ==
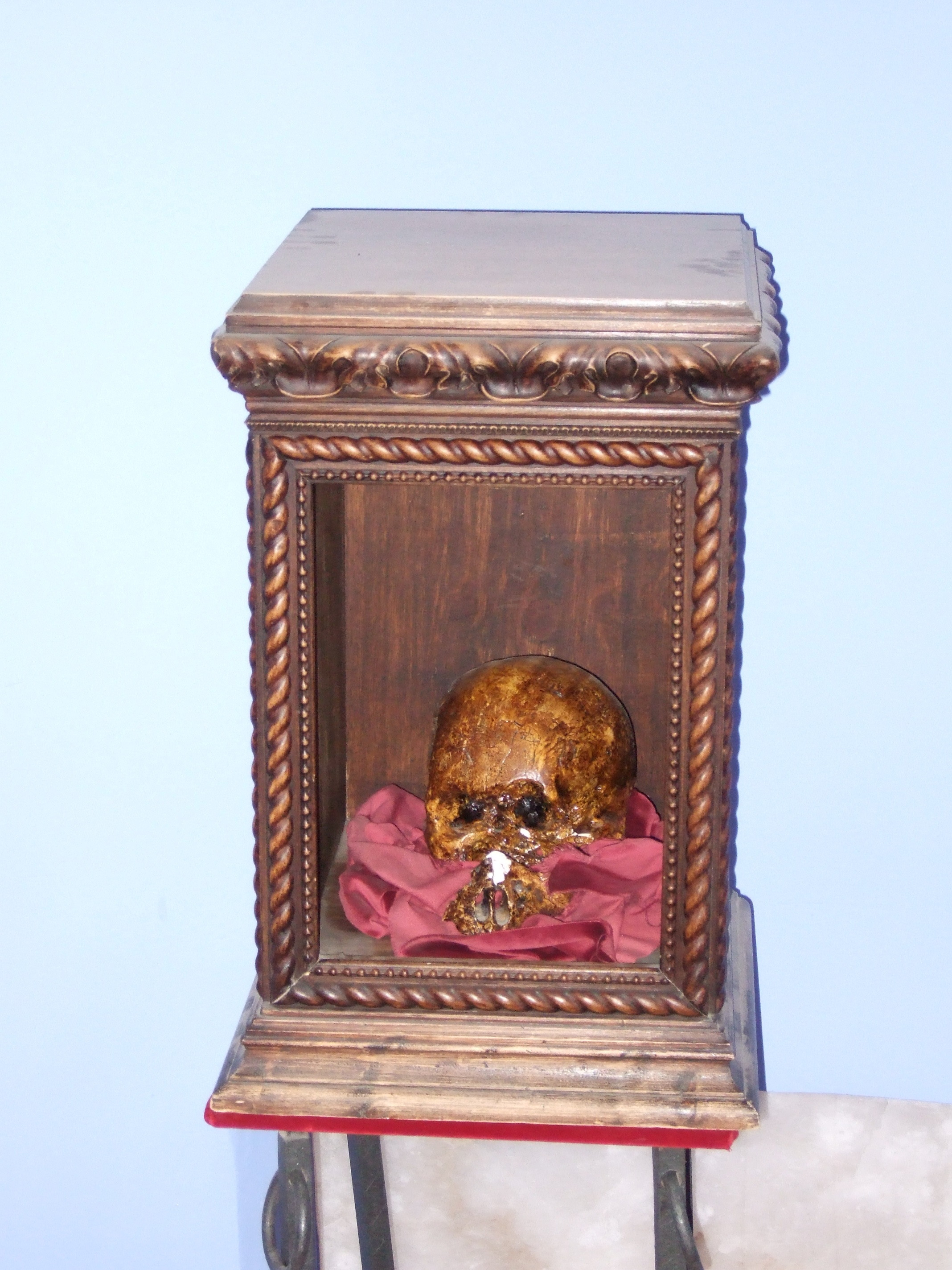
The skull in 2008 in Illueca.

Benedict XIII was buried in Peníscola castle. His body was later moved to Illueca; but during the War of the Spanish Succession his remains were destroyed. Only his skull was saved, and it was kept in the palace of the Counts of Argillo in Sabiñán. Aragon, Spain. In April 2000, it was stolen from the now ruined palace. The thieves sent an anonymous letter to the mayor of Illueca asking for 1,000,000 ₧ (€6,000). The Spanish Civil Guard found that they were two brothers who were sentenced in November 2006 to 6 months in prison, substituted with €2,190. The skull was recovered in September 2000. After an anthropological survey, it was placed in the Zaragoza Museum, where it is now in exhibition.

== Attempted rehabilitation ==
On 21 December 2018, the association "Friends of Pope Luna" presented to the Congregation for the Doctrine of the Faith a petition to have Benedict recognised as a legitimate pontiff.

== Accounts of his life ==
The Anti-pope (Peter de Luna, 1342–1423): A study in obstinacy by Alec Glasfurd, Roy Publishers, New York (1965) B0007IVH1Q is a somewhat fictionalised or imaginative account of his life.

Pluja seca by Jaume Cabré (2001) is a play based on his death and succession.

L'Anneau du pêcheur ("The Ring of the Fisherman"— a play on the words pêcheur, meaning fisherman, and pécheur, meaning sinner) is a 1995 novel by the French writer Jean Raspail. The narrative has two timelines: the time of Benedict XIII, the last antipope of the Avignon Papacy, and contemporary times, when the Catholic Church tries to discover Benedict's successor, as it turns out that his line of papacy has continued in secret throughout the centuries. The book received the Prix Maison de la Presse and the Prince Pierre Foundation's Literary Prize.

== Arms ==
Coat of arms of Antipope Benedict XIII
Notes There is than one coat of arms attributed to de Luna. These are the blazoned arms as featured in the seal of the University of St Andrews. The crescent moon alse features in the latter's arms. Escutcheon Chequy or and sable, on a chief argent, a crescent versé chequy as of the field.

== See also ==
- Papal selection before 1059
- Papal conclave (since 1274)

== Sources ==
- Chow, Gabriel. "Antipope Benedict XIII (1394–1423)". GCatholic.org. Toronto.
- Drees, Clayton J. (2000). "Benedict XIII, Antipope (b.1342, r.1394-1423)". The Late Medieval Age of Crisis and Renewal, 1300-1500: A Biographical Dictionary. Bloomsbury Publishing. ISBN 9781567507492.
- Kirsch, Johann Peter (1910). "Pedro de Luna". The Catholic Encyclopedia. Robert Appleton Company.
- McGinn, Bernard (2012). The Varieties of Vernacular Mysticism. Herder & Herder. ISBN 978-0824543921. 561
- McGurk, Francis, ed. (1976). Calendar of Papal Letters to Scotland of Benedict XIII of Avignon, 1394-1419. T. and A. Constable Ltd.
