= Antipope Alexander V =

Papal claimant from 1409 to 1410 (c. 1339 – 1410)

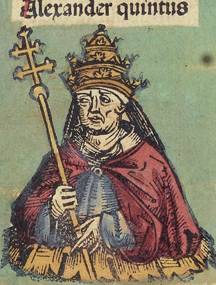
- Miniature of Alexander V in the Nuremberg Chronicle, 1493
- Papacy began: 26 June 1409
- Papacy ended: 3–4 May 1410
- Predecessor: Gregory XII
- Successor: Antipope John XXIII
- Opposed to: Roman claimant: Gregory XII; Avignon claimant: Benedict XIII

Personal details
- Born: Petros Philargos c. 1339 Neapoli, Crete, Republic of Venice
- Died: 3–4 May 1410 (aged 70–71) Bologna, Papal States
- Denomination: Catholic
- Coat of arms

Peter of Candia, also known as Petros Philarges (Greek: Πέτρος Φιλάργης) (c. 1339 – 3 May 1410), denominated Alexander V (Italian: Alessandro), was a claimant to papacy elected by the Council of Pisa during the Western Schism (1378–1417). He reigned briefly from 26 June 1409 to his death in 1410, in opposition to Rome's Gregory XII and Avignon's Benedict XIII. In the 20th century, the Catholic Church reinterpreted the Western Schism by recognising the Roman popes of the period as legitimate. The pontificate of Gregory XII was thus recognized to extend to 1415, and Alexander V was and is now recognized as an antipope.

== Life ==
Peter was born near modern Neapoli in Crete, then subject to the Republic of Venice, in 1339. Born into a Greek family, he was baptised Pietro Filargo, but is often known as Pietro di Candia and Peter Philarges. Italian Franciscans raised him after he was orphaned in his youth.

Peter entered the Franciscan order, and his abilities were such that he was sent to study at a Franciscan convent in Norwich and later at the Universities of Oxford and Paris. While he was in Paris the Western Schism occurred. Peter supported Pope Urban VI (1378–1389). He became an adviser to Giangaleazzo Visconti, the Duke of Milan, and for almost ten years, Peter was prime minister to Galeatus and his son. He returned to Lombardy, where, thanks to the favour of Giangaleazzo Visconti, Peter became bishop, first of Piacenza (1386), then of Vicenza (1387), then of Novara (1389), and finally Archbishop of Milan (1402). Pope Innocent VII (1404–1406) elevated him as cardinal in 1405.

=== Papal election ===
At the Council of Pisa (from 25 March 1409), the assembled cardinals elected Peter to the Supreme Pontificate, which they had declared vacant. He was also crowned on 26 June 1409 as Alexander V, rendering him the third rival claimant to the Papal office. Following his election, most polities in Europe recognised him as the true Pope, except the Kingdoms of Aragon and Scotland, which remained loyal to the Avignon claimant, and some Italian states, which recognized the Roman Pope.

During his reign of 10 months, Alexander's object was to extend obedience to him with the assistance of France and, notably, Duke Louis II of Anjou, upon whom he conferred the investiture of the Kingdom of Sicily, having deprived Ladislaus of Naples of it. He proclaimed and promised rather than effected many reforms: abandonment of the rights of "spoils" and "procurations", and the re-establishment of the system of canonical election in the cathedral churches and principal monasteries. He also generously granted Papal favours, from which the mendicant orders benefitted especially.

Alexander suddenly died while he was with Cardinal Baldassare Cossa in Bologna on the night of 3–4 May 1410. His remains were placed in the Church of St. Francis in Bologna. A rumour, though now considered false, spread that Cardinal Cossa, who succeeded him as Antipope John XXIII (1410–1415), poisoned him.

== Legacy ==
The Popes' drinking society at Greyfriars, University of Oxford, is traditionally held to have been founded by Peter during his time at the university. With the closure of Greyfriars in 2008, the society is now populated mainly by students of Regent's Park College, Oxford.

Previously, the Catholic Church considered the pontificate of Pope Gregory XII to have ended in 1409 with the election of Alexander V. In 1958, Pope St. John XXIII selected the regnal number XXIII, citing "twenty-two Johns of indisputable legitimacy". Because the previous "John XXIII" (r. 1410–1415) had succeeded Alexander V, the Pisan line became illegitimate. The pontificate of Gregory XII was recognized to extend to 1415, and the Church now recognizes Alexander V as an antipope. However, Alexander V remains in the numerical sequence of the regnal name Alexander because Rodrigo Borgia had taken the name Alexander VI in 1492.

== See also ==
- Papal selection before 1059
- Papal conclave (since 1274)

== Sources ==
- de Montor, Artaud; François, Alexis (1911). The Lives and Times of the Popes. Vol. 4. New York: Catholic Publication Society of America. pp. 109–111.
- Brown, Stephen F. (2010). "Peter of Canida's Commentary on the Sentences of Peter Lombard". In Rosemann, Philipp W. (ed.). Mediaeval Commentaries on the Sentences of Peter Lombard. Vol. 2. Brill. pp. 439–470.439
- Frank, J. W. (1978). "Die Obödienzerklärung des österreichischen Herzöge für Papst Alexander V. (1409)". Römische Historische Mitteilungen (in German). 20: 49–76.
- Gregorovius, Ferdinand (1906). History of Rome in the Middle Ages. Vol. VI. 2 (2nd revised ed.). London: George Bell. Book XII, chapter 5, pp. 598–612.
- Kelly, J. N. D.; Walsh, M. J. (2010). Oxford Dictionary of Popes (2nd ed.). Oxford: Oxford University Press.
- Logan, F. Donald (2013). A History of the Church in the Middle Ages. Routledge.
- Oakley, Francis (2008). "The Conciliar Heritage and the Politics of Oblivion". In Christianson, Gerald; Izbicki, Thomas M.; Bellitto, Christopher M. (eds.). The Church, the Councils, and Reform: The Legacy of the Fifteenth Century. The Catholic University of America Press.
- Freiherr von Pastor, Ludwig (1923). The History of the Popes: From the Close of the Middle Ages. Vol. 1 (5th ed.). Herder. pp. 177–191.
- Petrucci, Armando (2000). "Alessandro V, antipapa". Enciclopedia dei Papi (in Italian).
- Robson, J. A. (1961). Wyclif and the Oxford Schools. Cambridge at the University Press.
- Schabel, Christopher (2002). "Peter of Candia". In Gracia, Jorge J. E.; Noone, Timothy B. (eds.). A Companion to Philosophy in the Middle Ages. Blackwell. pp. 506–507.
- Sumption, Jonathan (2015). The Hundred Years War. Vol. IV: Cursed Kings. Philadelphia: University of Pennsylvania Press. ISBN 9780812247060.
- Tuilier, A. (1983). "L'élection d'Alexandre V, pape grec, sujet vénitien et docteur de l'Université de Paris". Rivista di Studi Bizantini e Slavi (in French). 3: 319–341.
- Valois, Noël (1902). La France et le grand schisme d'Occident Tome (in French). Vol. IV: Recours au Concile général. Paris: A. Picard et fils. pp. 102–129.
