= 1400s (decade) =

Decade

The 1400s ran from January 1, 1400, to December 31, 1409.

== Events ==
=== 1400 ===
==== January–March ====
- January 4 – The Epiphany Rising begins in England against King Henry IV by nobles planning to restore King Richard II to the throne, and is quickly crushed. Baron Lumley dies after attempting to seize Cirencester. The Earl of Salisbury and the Earl of Kent are captured and beheaded on January 7. Sir Thomas Blount is hanged, drawn and quartered at Oxford on January 12. Thomas le Despenser, 1st Earl of Gloucester is captured and executed by a mob in Bristol on January 13. The Earl of Huntingdon is beheaded at Pleshey on January 16.
- February 14 – The deposed Richard II of England dies by means unknown in Pontefract Castle. It is likely that King Henry IV ordered his death by starvation, to prevent further uprisings.
- February – Henry Percy (Hotspur) leads English incursions into Scotland.
- March 23 – Five-year-old Trần Thiếu Đế is forced to abdicate as ruler of Đại Việt (modern-day Vietnam), in favour of his maternal grandfather and court official Hồ Quý Ly, ending the Trần dynasty after 175 years and starting the Hồ dynasty. Hồ Quý Ly subsequently changes the country's name to Đại Ngu.

==== April–June ====
- April 21 – Sir Thomas Percy, 1st Earl of Worcester, resigns as England's Admiral of the North and West to join the resistance against King Henry IV. The office will remain vacant for more than six years. Percy will be beheaded in 1403 after his defeat in the Battle of Shrewsbury.
- April 23 – In what is now Romania, Alexandru cel Bun (Alexander the Good) is installed as the new Prince (Voivode) of Moldavia by Mircea the Elder, the Voivode of Wallachia, after Mircea removes the reigning monarch, Prince Iuga.
- April 25 – Jingnan campaign: In the Shandong province of Ming dynasty China, Zhu Di, Prince of Yan, defeats the Imperial forces of General Li Jinglong in the two-day Battle of Baigou River, by taking advantage of the chaos that results when a gust of wind breaks the staff of General Li's flag of battle. The Yan forces capture 100,000 of the Imperial soldiers as prisoners and Li and the others retreat to Jinan.
- April – King Swa Saw Ke, of Ava, the largest kingdom in Burma, dies after a reign of 33 years and is succeeded by his son, King Tarabya, who reigns less than seven months before being assassinated.
- May 22 – Meeting in Frankfurt, three of the prince-electors of the Holy Roman Empire (Rupert, elector of the Palatinate, Rudolf III, Duke of Saxe-Wittenberg, elector of Saxony, and Jobst of Moravia, elector of Brandenburg) meet in an attempt to replace the Emperor, Wenceslaus, King of the Romans because of his failure to stamp out civil unrest or to resolve the Western Schism. They select Frederick I, Duke of Brunswick-Lüneburg as the replacement for Wenceslaus.
- June 5 – Duke Frederick I of Brunswick-Lüneburg is assassinated after being identified as a rival to Wenceslaus, Holy Roman Emperor. Frederick, on his way back from a May 22 meeting of the prince-electors, is ambushed by a party of men led by Count Henry of Waldeck while passing through the village of Kleinenglis in the Principality of Waldeck and Pyrmont (now part of the German state of Hesse, near Borken).

==== July–September ====
- July 7 – Sir John Swinton, an envoy of King Robert III of Scotland, crosses the border into England along with 20 knights, after being given a writ of safe conduct by King Henry IV to allow their travel to negotiate during the standoff between the two British kingdoms between phases of the Hundred Years' War.
- July 26 – Jagiellonian University is re-established in Kraków by order of King Władysław II, with the creation of the Faculty of Theology at what is then called the Kraków Academy. The restoration is partially financed by the sale of jewelry owned by the King's late wife, Queen Jadwiga, who had died in 1399.
- August 6 – Writing from Newcastle upon Tyne to Scotland's King Robert III, England's King Henry IV sends a demand that King Robert meet him "on Monday the 23rd of this present month of August, at Edinburgh, where, for this reason and for the peace of tranquility of the realms of England and Scotland, we intend to be," for Robert "to perform the obligation which you owe us" as "overlords of Scotland and of its kings in all temporal matters pertaining to them..." King Henry warns that "considering the effusion of Christian blood and other dangers and losses which may occur if you do not comply with our wishes, you will be present to render us homage and take the oath of fealty."
- August 14 – King Henry IV leads the English Army into Scotland, after receiving no answer from Scotland's King Robert III to his August 6 demand. The troops reach Haddington, East Lothian the next day and at Leith, on the outskirts of Edinburgh, by August 18. As historian James Hamilton Wylie will note almost 500 years later, "the walls of Edinburgh did not fall before this ram's-horn blast, and August 23rd came and went without the required homage or recognition."
- August 20 – Meeting at the Lahneck Castle in what is now the German state Rhineland-Palatinate, the princes of the German states vote to depose the Holy Roman Emperor, Wenceslaus, due to his weak leadership and mental illnesses.
- August 21 – Rupert, Count Palatine of the Rhine, is elected as King of the Romans.
- August 29 – Having failed in his expedition to receive a pledge of fealty from the King of Scotland, King Henry IV crosses back into England.
- September 16 – Owain Glyndŵr is proclaimed Prince of Wales by his followers, and begins attacking English strongholds in northeast Wales.

==== October–December ====
- October 7 – Tamerlane, the Mongol conqueror, stops between Malatya and Aleppo at the Turkish garrison in Behesna. According to author Peter Purton, the garrison "had the temerity to shoot a catapult ball at Timur which rolled into his tent. Setting up his own battery of 20 machines, it is said that the first shot hit and destroyed the offending weapon. Treating this as a good omen, the attack was launched, the towers mined... and the place surrendered."
- October 29 – Jingnan campaign: In China, Prince Zhu Di of Yan expands his conquests with the capture of Cangzhou in Heibei province.
- October 30 – (11 Rabi' I 803 AH) Tamerlane begins the destruction of the Syrian city of Aleppo overwhelming the Mamluk Sultanate defenders.
- November 2 – The Mamluk Sultanate surrenders the city of Aleppo and Tamerlane's Army massacres many of the inhabitants.
- November 25 – (9th waxing of Nadaw, 730 ME) Minkhaung I becomes the new King of Ava, the largest kingdom in what is now northern Myanmar, after a battle for power that follows the assassination of the erratic King Tarabya.
- December 21 – Manuel II Palaiologos becomes the only Byzantine Emperor ever to visit England, and is greeted at Blackheath by King Henry IV, who hosts the Emperor at Eltham Palace during the Christmas holiday.
- December 25 – In China, the Jingnan campaign of Prince Zhu Di of Yan suffers a serious reversal at the Battle of Dongchang as Imperial General Sheng Yong, replacement of Li Jinglong, encircles the Yan forces. Yan Army General Zhang Yu is killed, but Zhu Di is able to escape to the northern capital at Beijing and regroups his forces for a second attack to take place in February.

==== Date unknown ====
- Timur defeats both the Ottoman Empire and the Mamluk Sultanate of Egypt, to capture the city of Damascus in present-day Syria. Much of the city's inhabitants are subsequently massacred by Timur's troops.
- Timur conquers the Empire of The Black Sheep Turkomans, in present-day Azerbaijan, and the Jalayirid dynasty in present-day Iraq. Black Sheep ruler Qara Yusuf and Jalayirid Sultan Ahmad flee, and take refuge with the Ottoman Sultan Bayezid I.
- In modern-day Korea, King Jeongjong of Joseon abdicates in fear of an attack by his ambitious younger brother, Taejong. Taejong succeeds to the throne.
- Prince Parameswara establishes the Malacca Sultanate, in present-day western Malaysia and northern Sumatra.
- Hananchi succeeds Min as King of Hokuzan, in modern-day north Okinawa, Japan.
- Wallachia (modern-day southern Romania) resists an invasion by the Ottomans.
- A Wallachian army captures Iuga, and makes Alexandru cel Bun the Prince of Moldavia.
- The Kingdom of Kongo begins.
- The Haast's eagle and Moa are both driven to extinction by Māori hunters.
- The Mississippian culture starts to decline.
- Europe is reported to have around 52 million inhabitants.
- The House of Medici becomes powerful in Florence.
- Newcastle upon Tyne is created a county corporate, by Henry IV of England.
- Jean Froissart completes his Chronicles, detailing the events of the 14th Century in France.

=== 1401 ===
==== January–March ====
- January 6 – Rupert, King of Germany, is crowned King of the Romans at Cologne.
- January 12 – Emperor Hồ Quý Ly of Dai Ngu (now Vietnam) passes the throne to his son, Hồ Hán Thương.
- January 16 – After their disastrous defeat on December 25 in the Battle of Dongchang in the Jingnan campaign, the forces of the Principality of Yan within China return to Beiping (located at the site of present-day Beijing).
- January 20 – The Parliament of England is opened at Westminster by King Henry IV.
- February 3 – The Byzantine Emperor Manuel II Palaiologos, who has spent almost two months in England as the guest of King Henry IV, accepts a payment of 3,000 English gold marks in support of an alliance between the two nations, then makes plans to depart England for France.
- February 16 –
  - Jingnan campaign: After a month's recovery from defeat in battle in China, Prince Zhu Di mobilizes his troops at Beijing and marches south to fight the Ming dynasty Emperor Huizong.
  - John Barry is appointed as the new Attorney-General for Ireland.
- March 2 – William Sawtrey, a Roman Catholic priest and adherent to the Lollard faith becomes the first person in England to be burned at the stake under the new De heretico comburendo law (officially the Suppression of Heresy Act 1400), dying at Smithfield, London after being convicted of heresy against the Roman Catholic faith.
- March 10 – As the English Parliament session closes, King Henry IV gives royal assent to the Suppression of Heresy Act, permitting secular authorities to carry out punishment for religious crimes. The assent comes after the Archbishop of Canterbury pressures King Henry to outlaw the Lollards, followers of John Wycliffe, and criminalizes possession of a copy of Wycliffe's translation of the Bible.
- March 13 – The Samogitians, supported by Grand Duke Vytautas of Lithuania, rebel against the Teutonic knights and burn two castles. Vytautas is granted increased autonomy by King Jogaila of the Poland–Lithuania union.
- March 17 – Turko-Mongol Emperor Timur sacks Damascus.
- March 22 – Jingnan campaign: Prince Zhu Di of Yan leads his troops across the Jia River into the Heibei province. China's Ming dynasty Emperor Huizong directs that Zhu Di is not to be killed.

==== April–June ====
- April 1 – Conwy Castle in English-ruled North Wales, is captured on Good Friday by trickery by two Welsh brothers, Rhys ap Tudur and Gwilym ap Tudur of the Island of Anglesey, in support of the anti-English rebellion led by Owain Glyndŵr.
- April 28 – King Zsigmond of Hungary refuses to comply with demands of the Archbishop John Kanizsai and the Palatine Derek Bebek, he is taken prisoner. Sigismund remains captive until October 29.
- May 6 – The council of the Republic of Venice passes a law prohibiting the Republic's executive, the Doge, from using the state owned official ship, the bucentaur, from being used for private purposes.
- May 25 – Maria, Queen of Sicily since 1377 since succeeding her father, King Frederick the Simple, dies after a reign of almost 34 years.
- May 31 – Laurence Allerthorp becomes the new Lord High Treasurer of England, succeeding Sir John Norbury.
- June 15 – Jingnan campaign: The rebel Yan forces destroy the food supplies of the Ming Chinese government at Dezhou.
- June 24 – (13th day of 5th month Ōei 8) The shogun Ashikaga Yoshimitsu dispatches a mission to Ming Dynasty China as the first step of opening trade between the two nations.
- June 25 – The Schaffhausen massacre of 30 Jewish residents, by burning, of the town of Schaffhausen takes place in Switzerland after the April 3 murder of 4-year-old Konrad Lori.
- June – The English Pale in Ireland is reduced to Dublin, County Kildare, County Louth, and County Meath.

==== July–September ====
- July 9 – (27 Dhu al-Qadah 803 A.H.) Timur raids the city of Baghdad, in the Jalayirid Empire, then carries out a massacre of its inhabitants, including women and children, as punishment for resisting his rule. According to accounts later, "90,000 human heads were piled up on the public places of the town." The only persons spared death are "theologians, shaikhs and dervishes", and the only buildings not demolished are "mosques, universities and hostels."
- July 15 – Jingnan campaign: Chinese Empire troops, led by Fang Zhao, launch a raid on the Yan principality capital at Beiping, forcing Yan PrinceZhu Di to bring his troops back north.
- August 5 – The County of Geneva, located in southeastern France in the Auvergne-Rhône-Alpes region, comes to an end after more than 300 years when it is sold to Amadeus VIII, Count of Savoy for 45,000 gold francs
- September 18 – Jingnan campaign: The Yan principality defeats the Chinese imperial forces at Beiping after a siege of more than two months.
- September 24 – The late English cleric John Twenge (1320-1379) is canonized as Saint John of Bridlington by Pope Boniface IX

==== October–December ====
- October 14 – Sultan Nasir-ud-Din Mahmud Shah Tughluq of Delhi is restored to power.
- October 29 – King Zsigmond of Hungary is released from imprisonment by order of the Royal Council.
- November 2 – The Battle of Tuthill takes place at Caernarfon in Wales as Owain Glyndŵr loses 300 soldiers in an attack by the English Army.
- December 2 – Jingnan campaign: Rebel General Zhu Di adopts a new approach in his war against the Chinese Imperial troops and departs from Beiping to drive troops southward to the Yangtze River, capturing Dong'e, Dongping, Wenshang, and Pei over the next two months.

==== Date unknown ====
- Dilawar Khan establishes the Malwa Sultanate in present-day northern India.
- The Joseon dynasty in present-day Korea officially enters into a tributary relationship with Ming dynasty China.
- Japan re-enters into a tributary relationship with China.

=== 1402 ===
==== January–March ====
- January 29 – King Jogaila of the Poland–Lithuania Union answers the rumblings against his rule of Poland, by marrying Anna of Celje, a granddaughter of Casimir III of Poland.
- February 8 – The Great Comet of 1402 is first observed by people living in the Northern Hemisphere of Earth. The comet, visible for eight days even in daylight, makes its closest approach to Earth on February 20. It is last seen on March 27.
- February 19 – Sigismund of Křižanov, Prokop of Luxemburg and King Wenceslas IV of Bohemia carry out an unsuccessful raid on the military garrison of Jihlava in an attack against the Kingdom of Croatia, led by Sigismund of Luxembourg. The Bohemians are routed, and Wenceslas is captured.
- March 26 – David Stewart, Duke of Rothesay, heir to the throne of Scotland, dies while being held captive by his uncle, Robert Stewart, 1st Duke of Albany.

==== April–June ====
- April 2 – Jingnan campaign: In China, the Yan Army, led by Prince Zhu Di reaches Suishui, west of Huaibei, in what is now the Anhui province.
- April 3 – King Henry IV of England is married by proxy to Joan of Navarre in a ceremony at the Eltham Palace near London.
- April 29 – Jingnan campaign: The Yan Army overwhelms the Imperial Army of Southern China at Linghi, capturing General Ping An.
- May 7 – Jingnan campaign: The Yan Army continues its march, capturing Sixian and reaching the north bank of the Huai River.
- May 21 – Following the death of Queen Maria of Sicily, her husband Martin I of Sicily, now sole ruler, marries Blanche of Navarre by proxy. They marry in person on December 26.
- June 3 – Jingnan campaign: After crossing the Huai River into what is now Jiangsu province, and taking Yangzhou (May 18) and Luhe (May 19), the Yan Army of Zhu Di crosses the Yangtze River at Guazhou and is within striking distance of the Imperial Chinese capital at Nanjing by June 8, forcing Emperor Zhu Yun Wen to prepare terms of surrender that include granting the Yan Kingdom areas north of the Yangtze. Zhu Di refuses.
- June 13 – Jingnan campaign: The Army of Yan arrives at the walls of Nanjing, capital of Imperial China and surrounds the city. The defenders on the north side open the Jinchuan Gate and let the invaders in. China's Emperor Zhu Yun Wen then orders for the palace to be set on fire with himself and his followers burned to death inside before the Yan King Zhu Di arrives. Zhu Di orders the execution of 29 palace officials.
- June 14 – Zhu Di, King of the Yan State at Beijing, becomes the new Ming Dynasty Emperor of China at Nanjing, uniting north and south China.
- June 22
  - Battle of Nesbit Moor: An English force decisively defeats a returning Scottish raiding party.
  - Battle of Bryn Glas: Welsh rebels under Owain Glyndŵr defeat the English on the England/Wales border. The Welsh capture Edmund Mortimer, son of the 3rd Earl, who defects to the Welsh cause, on 30 November marrying Owain's daughter Catrin.
- June 26 – Battle of Casalecchio: Gian Galeazzo Visconti, the Duke of Milan, crushes the forces of Bologna and Florence. He dies from a fever less than three months later.

==== July–September ====
- July 17 – The Ming dynasty prince Zhu Di of Yan is formally crowned as the Emperor Cheng Zu of Ming at Nanjing, marking the end of the Jingnan campaign.
- July 20 – Battle of Ankara: An invading Timurid Empire force defeats the Ottoman Sultan Bayezid I, who is captured. A period of interregnum begins in the Ottoman Empire, with the future Mehmed I as one of the leading claimants to the throne. After Serbia is freed from Ottoman rule, Stefan Lazarević is crowned Despot of Serbia.
- August 1 – Edward of Norwich becomes the second Duke of York in England upon the death of his father, Edmund of Langley. He will serve until his death in 1415 in the Battle of Agincourt.
- August 15 – King Enrique III of Castile and León (comprising most of Spain) signs a peace treaty with his brother-in-law, King João I of Portugal, ending fighting that began in 1396. The wives of the two kings, Catherine of Lancaster and Philippa of Lancaster respectively, are sisters.
- September 3 – Gian Maria Visconti becomes the second Duke of Milan upon the death of his father, Gian Galeazzo Visconti.
- September 14 – Battle of Homildon Hill: Northern English nobles, led by Sir Henry Percy (Hotspur), and using longbows, decisively defeat a Scottish raiding army and capture their leader, the Earl of Douglas.
- September 30 – The new session of the English Parliament is opened by King Henry IV and lasts for almost two months.

==== October–December ====
- October 1 – The House of Commons of England is opened at Coventry by King Henry IV, whose Lord Chancellor asks the members to pass a tax to support an offensive war against Scotland, enemies of Wales, Ireland and for defending the Marches of Guienne and Calais. Henry Redford is elected Speaker of the House.
- October 10 – A rare conference begins in England between the House of Commons and the House of Lords takes place with the permission of the King, and results in a 3-shilling tax on wine and a 14-pence tax on other merchandise.
- October 28 – The "False Olaf", a Bohemian immigrant who bore a resemblance to the late King Olaf of Denmark and Norway and impersonated the late monarch earlier in the year, is burned at the stake as punishment.
- November 5 – The Republic of Genoa resumes control of Monaco, deposing Louis Grimaldi. Genoese control lasts for more than 16 years.
- November 21 – Stefan Lazarević leads the Serbian Despotate to victory over the Ottoman Governor Durad Brankovic at the Battle of Tripolje.
- November 23 – The Byzantine Emperor Manuel II Palaiologos leaves France after a stay of almost two years.
- November 25 – The fourth parliament of King Henry IV of England closes at Westminster after two months and the passage of new laws, including the penal Laws against Wales which stop the Welsh from gathering together, obtaining office, carrying arms and living in English towns. The laws apply to any Englishman who marries a Welsh woman.
- December 2 – (6 Jumada al-Awwal 805 A.H.) With 4,000 troops, Tamerlane, Amir of the Timurid Empire covering much of what is now Iraq, Iran and Afghanistan begins the Siege of Smyrna (now Izmir in Turkey). Smyrna is captured after two days of attacks on its outer walls. After the Christian Knights of Saint John, who are ruling Smyrna, refuse to convert to Islam or pay tribute, Timur has the entire Christian population massacred. The Knights subsequently begin building Bodrum Castle in Bodrum, to defend against future attacks.
- December 26 – (3rd waxing of Tabodwe 764 ME) Ava–Hanthawaddy War: In what is now Myanmar, the forces of the Ava Kingdom, led by King Minkhaung I defeat King Razadarit of the Kingdom of Hanthawaddy in the Battle of Nawin, forcing Razadarit to abandon the siege of Prome.

==== Date unknown ====
- The Malacca Sultanate is established at Melaka Darul Azim (modern-day Melaka Darul Azim, Malaysia).
- Conquest of the Canary Islands: King Henry III of Castile sends French explorer Jean de Béthencourt to colonize the Canary Islands. Béthencourt receives the title King of the Canary Islands but recognizes Henry as his overlord.
- The Republic of Genoa regains control of Monaco.
- The Aq Qoyunlu ("White Sheep Turkmen") tribal confederation, in modern-day northern Iraq and Iran, moves its capital from Amida to Diyarbakır.
- Moldavia becomes a vassal of the Kingdom of Poland in order to protect itself from an invasion by Hungary.
- Maria II Zaccaria succeeds her husband, Pedro de San Superano, as regent of the Principality of Achaea (modern-day southern Greece).
- Conchobar an Abaidh mac Maelsechlainn O Cellaigh succeeds Maelsechlainn mac William Buidhe O Cellaigh, as King of Uí Maine in modern-day County Galway and County Roscommon in Ireland.
- The University of Würzburg is founded.
- The Gangnido map of the world is completed in Joseon dynasty Korea.
- A Great comet is sighted.
- A big fire in the city of Utrecht starts near the Jacobikerk.

=== 1403 ===
==== January–March ====
- January 5 – In what is now Myanmar, peace negotiations begin between King Razadarit of Hanthawaddy at his capital Pegu, with the emissaries of Minkhaung I, ruler of the Kingdom of Ava, 10 days after the Ava forces defeated Razadarit's army at the Battle of Nawin.
- January 23 – The Yongle Era in China begins with the first day of the Chinese New Year, six months after King Zhu Di of the Yan State arrived at Nanjing, deposed the southern Chinese Emperor Zhu Yun Wen, and proclaimed himself as the Emperor Cheng Zu.
- February 20 – Signing of the Treaty of Gallipoli is completed as Süleyman Çelebi makes wide-ranging concessions to the Byzantine Empire and other Christian powers, in the southern Balkans.
- February 7 – King Henry IV of England marries as his second wife Joan of Navarre, the daughter of King Charles II of Navarre and widow of John IV, Duke of Brittany, at Winchester Cathedral.
- March 12 – As King Martin I of Aragon helps to end the siege by the French of the papal palace in Avignon, Antipope Benedict XIII flees to Aragon.
- March 13 – Muhammad Sultan Mirza, the favorite grandson and heir to the throne of the Emperor Tamerlane, Emperor of Transoxiana (comprising modern Afghanistan and parts of Iran, Tadzikstan and Kazakhstan), dies from injuries sustained in the Battle of Ankara.
- March 23 – Stříbrná Skalice in Central Bohemia is razed by Sigismund of Luxembourg.

==== April–June ====
- April 1 – Prince Henry of England, son of King Henry IV, is appointed by his father to serve for one year as the Royal Lieutenant of Wales, with command over English toops to fight the Welsh rebels.
- April 3 – Jean II Le Maingre of France, also known as Boucicaut, the French Governor of Genoa, leads a fleet of 18 ships, 600 horses and 700 infantry to stop an attack by Muslims on the island of Cyprus and the city of Famagusta. Boucicaut besieges the Muslim city of Candelore on June 24.
- April – Balša III succeeds his father Đurađ II as ruler of the Principality of Zeta (now Montenegro).
- May 21 – Ruy Gonzalez de Clavijo, an ambassador from the king of Castile to Timur, leaves Cadiz; he arrives in Samarkand over a year later.
- June 9 – The Byzantine Emperor Manuel II Palaiologos returns to Constantinople after an absence for more than two years in Western Europe.
- June 3 – The coronation of Eleanor of Castile, wife of King Carlos III of Navarre, as Queen of Navarre takes place in Pamplona, now in Spain.
- June 14 – The Emperor Manuel II restores Matthew I as the Ecumenical Patriarch of Constantinople, leader of the Eastern Orthodox Christians. Matthew had been deposed the previous autumn during the Emperor's absence from Byzantium.
- June 15 – John III of Soltaniyeh, an Domincan friar of the Roman Catholic Church, arrives in Paris as an emissary of the conqueror Timur, Emir of Transoxiana, in order to secure an agreement with King Charles VI of France in order to open trade relations between the two nations.

==== July–September ====
- July 21 – Battle of Shrewsbury: King Henry IV of England defeats a rebel army led by "Hotspur" Percy, who had allied with the Welsh rebel Owain Glyndŵr. Percy is killed in the battle.
- August 5 – The coronation of Ladislaus of Naples as King of Hungary and Croatia takes place in Zara (now Zadar in Croatia), where Ladislaus had arrived on July 19. His reign lasts less than four months before he is deposed.
- September 4 – The first 200 Chinese treasure ships are ordered by the new Ming dynasty Emperor Cheng Zu from the Capital Guards at Nanjing.

==== October–December ====
- October 7 – Battle of Modon: The Genoese fleet under Jean Le Maingre (Marshal Boucicaut) is defeated by the Republic of Venice, at Modon in the Peloponnese.
- October 18 – An English fleet organised by John Hawley of Dartmouth and Thomas Norton of Bristol seizes seven French merchant vessels in the English Channel.
- November 9 – Waleran III, Count of Ligny, a relative in France of the late King Richard II of England, informs King Henry IV (who killed King Richard) of plans to lead an attack on England.
- November – An English revenge raid on Brittany by Sir William Wilford captures 40 ships and causes considerable damage ashore.
- December 12 – Local English forces defeat an attempted French raid on the Isle of Wight under Waleran III, Count of Ligny.
- December 22 – Pope Boniface IX annuls and revokes numerous indulgences previously paid to the Roman Catholic Church in return for a reduction of time in purgatory.

==== Date unknown ====
- Jan Hus begins preaching Wycliffite ideas in Bohemia.
- In China, the Emperor Cheng Zu moves the capital from Nanjing to Beijing, commissions the Yongle Encyclopedia, one of the world's earliest and largest known general encyclopedias, and orders his coastal provinces to build a vast fleet of ships, with construction centered at Longjiang near Nanjing; the inland provinces are to provide wood and float it down the Yangtze River.
- The Temple of a City God is constructed in Shanghai.
- The Gur-e Amir Mausoleum is built in Samarkand by Timur, after the death of his grandson Muhammad Sultan, and eventually becomes the family mausoleum of the Timurid dynasty.
- Georgia makes peace with Timur, but has to recognise him as a suzerain and pay him tribute.
- The world's first quarantine station, the Lazzaretto Vecchio, is built in Venice, to protect against the Black Death.
- Grand Duke Vytautas ends his alliance with Muscovy, and captures Vyazma and Smolensk.
- Stefan Lazarević establishes Belgrade, as the capital of the Serbian Despotate.
- A guild of stationers is founded in the City of London. As the Worshipful Company of Stationers and Newspaper Makers (the "Stationers' Company"), it continues to be a livery company in the 21st century.
- In Ireland
  - Tadhg Ruadh mac Maelsechlainn O Cellaigh succeeds Conchobar an Abaidh mac Maelsechlainn O Cellaigh, as King of Hy-Many, in present-day counties Galway and Roscommon.
  - Maolmhordha mac Con Connacht succeeds Giolla Iosa mac Pilib, as King of East Breifne, in present-day counties Leitrim and Cavan.
- probable – Ououso becomes King of Nanzan, in present-day south Okinawa, Japan.

=== 1404 ===
==== January–March ====
- January 14 – The fourth Parliament of King Henry IV of England opens for a session of two months.
- February 10 – Thomas of Lancaster, the second son of King Henry IV of England, becomes Admiral of the North and South succeeding Admiral Thomas Beaufort.
- February 27 – King Guadarfia of the Canary Islands surrenders to the French explorer Jean de Béthencourt, who declares himself to be the new king, but subservient to the sponsor of the expedition, King Enrique III of Castile (part of modern-day Spain)
- March 1 – Under the Emperor Cheng Zu, China continues to build its fleet, ordering the construction of 50 new seagoing ships from the Capital Guards in Nanjing.
- March 20 – As the English Parliament adjourns, King Henry IV gives royal assent to acts that have passed, including the Multipliers Act, which declares "It shall be felony to use the craft of multiplication of gold or silver.", prohibiting any alchemists who has actually may have discovered how to perform transmutation of other substances into precious metals. The law remains in force until repealed 284 years later.

==== April–June ====
- April 12 – Centurione II Zaccaria buys the Principality of Achaea, located on the Peloponnese peninsula in modern-day Greece, from King Ladislaus of Naples.
- April 25 – The War of Padua begins in the Veneto region of northeastern Italy as the army of the Republic of Venice, led by General Malatesta dei Sonetti, leads an attack on Padua, led by the Lord Francesco Novello da Carrara. The city of Vicenza surrenders to the Venetian troops on the same day, while the war against Padua last 19 months.
- April 27 – At Dijon, in France's Burgundian State, John the Fearless (Jean sans Peur), nephew of Charles VI of France, becomes the new Duke of Burgundy upon the death of his father, Philip the Bold.
- April or May – Battle of Blackpool Sands: Local English forces defeat an attempted raid from Saint-Malo on the port of Dartmouth, Devon; the French commander, William du Chastel, is killed.
- May 22 – The Peace of Raciążek treaty is signed by the representatives of King Władysław II Jagiełło of Poland, by the Grand Duke Vytautas of Lithuania, and by the Teutonic Knights.
- June 14 – Welsh rebel leader Owain Glyndŵr enters an alliance with the French against the English. He has begun to hold parliamentary assemblies (first on May 10 at Dolgellau).
- June 21 – The formal coronation of Owain Glyndŵr as Prince of Wales takes place at Harlech.

==== July–September ====
- July 27 – In Southern India, Bukka Raya II becomes the new ruler of the Vijayanagara Empire in what are the modern-day Indian states of Karnataka, Andhra Pradesh, Tamil Nadu and Kerala.
- September 14 – Albert IV, Duke of Austria, dies at the age of 26 from an illness contracted while he was fighting against Bohemia and Moravia for control of the city of Znaim (modern Znojmo in the Czech Republic). He is succeeded as Duke by his 6-year old son, Albert.

==== October–December ====
- October 16 – The 5th Parliament of King Henry IV of England (summoned August 25), nicknamed "The Unlearned Parliament" because Henry refuses to allow lawyers to sit, opens for a four week session in Coventry, closing on November 13.
- October 17 – Cosimo de' Migliorati, Cardinal of the Basilica Cross in Jerusalem, is elected unanimously by eight cardinals to succeed the late Pope Boniface IX. Migliorati takes the papal name Innocent VII as the 204th pope of the Roman Catholic Church.
- November 19 – The St. Elizabeth's flood of the North Sea devastates parts of Flanders, Zeeland and Holland.
- December 16 – Willem VI becomes the new Count of Holland upon the death of his father, Albrecht I, Duke of Lower Bavaria.

==== Date unknown ====
- Jean de Béthencourt becomes the first ruler of the Kingdom of the Canary Islands.
- Stephan Tvrtko II succeeds Stefan Ostoja as King of Bosnia.
- Peace is declared between Lithuania and the Teutonic Knights, after they agree to exchange land and form an alliance against Muscovy.
- A civil war, lasting two years, breaks out in the Majapahit Empire in modern-day Indonesia.
- Wallachia reaches its maximum extent under Mircea cel Bătrân.
- The University of Turin is founded.
- Timur is hit by a fever, while preparing to invade China.
- Virupaksha Raya succeeds Harihara Raya II, as ruler of the Vijayanagara Empire in modern-day southern India.
- Narayana Ramadhipati succeeds Ponthea Yat as King of Cambodia.
- Ruaidri Caech MacDermot succeeds Conchobair Óg MacDermot as King of Magh Luirg, in what later becomes northeast Connacht, Ireland.

=== 1405 ===
==== January–March ====
- January 19 – Upon the death of Prince Sigismund of Anhalt-Dessau (now within the federal state of Saxony-Anhalt in southeastern Germany), his four sons Waldemar IV, George, Albert V and Sigismund II become the joint rulers of the principality. Upon the death of Waldemar in 1417, Sigismund in 1452, and Albert in 1469, George will reign alone for five more years until his death in 1469.
- February 20 – Khalil Sultan becomes the new ruler of the western side of the Timurid Empire upon the death of his grandfather, the Mongol conqueror Tamerlane, while the son of Tamerlane, Shah Rukh, becomes the ruler of the eastern side.
- March 18 – News reaches the Timurid Empire that Tamerlane has died, and a period of mourning begins as Tamerlane is interred at the Gur-e-Amir mausoleum in Samarkand, now in the Republic of Uzbekistan.
- March 21 – John the Fearless, already Duke of Burgundy, becomes the Count of Flanders upon the death of his mother, Margaret III, Countess of Flanders, bringing the French speakers of Burgundy and the Flemish speaking citizens of Flanders under common rule in what will later become the Kingdom of Belgium.
- March 31 – Antonio I Acciaioli, Duke of Athens, reaches an agreement with the Venetian Senate and with Michele Steno, Doge of Venice, for payment of reparations to Venice in return for being able to continue ruling Athens.

==== April–June ====
- April 11 – The three sons of Philip the Bold—John the Fearless, Philip II, and Anthony— agree at Arras to partition the Burgundian lands of their father between themselves, with John to retain Flanders, Philip to take the County of Nevers, and Anthony to retain Rethel as well to purchase the Duchy of Brabant from John.
- May 5 – At the Battle of Pwll Melyn, fought in Wales, Baron Grey of Codnor routs the Welsh rebels commanded by two sons and the brother of the rebel leader Owain Glyndwr. Owain's eldest son, Gruffud, is taken as a prisoner of war by the English, while the brother, Tudur ap Gruffudd, is killed in action.
- May 29 – In England, Ralph Neville, 1st Earl of Westmorland, meets Richard le Scrope, Archbishop of York and Earl of Norfolk Thomas Mowbray in Shipton Moor, tricks them to send their rebellious army home, and then imprisons them.
- June 8 – Richard le Scrope, Archbishop of York and Thomas Mowbray, Earl of Norfolk, are executed in York on Henry IV's orders.

==== July–September ====
- July 11 – Ming Dynasty fleet commander Zheng He sets sail from Suzhou, to explore the world for the first time.
- August 29 – Cardinal Angelo Acciaioli is appointed by Pope Innocent VII to be the Grand Chancellor of the Holy Roman Church, filling a vacancy that has existed since the death of Francesco Moricotti Prignani in 1394.
- September 20 – An-Nasir Faraj, the Mamluk Sultan of Egypt and Syria, flees Cairo and names his brother Izz al-Din Abd al-Aziz as the regent during his absence. Faraj returns two months later and reclaims the throne.

==== October–December ====
- October 5 – Christine de Pizan writes a letter to Queen Isabeau, urging her to intervene in the political struggle between the dukes of Burgundy and Orléans.
- November 17 – The Sultanate of Sulu is established on the Sulu Archipelago, off the coast of Mindanao in the Philippines.
- November 22 – The War of Padua in Italy comes to an end as Padua and Ferrara surrender to the armies of the Venetian Republic, commanded by General Malatesta IV. The Republic of Venice then annexes the territory of the defeated lordships.
- December 6 – King Zsigmond of Hungary marries for the second time, in a wedding to Barbara of Cilli.
- December 21 – King Henry IV of England summons the members of the "Long Parliament", the sixth session of the English House of Commons and the House of Lords, to assemble at Westminster on "March 1, 1405", the "old style" date for March 1, 1406.
- December 27 – The Imperial Chinese Army invades the Lan Na kingdom, covering an area now divided between Myanmar, Thailand and China's Yunnan province.

==== Date unknown ====
- The first record is written of whiskey being consumed in Ireland, where it is distilled by Catholic monks.
- Bellifortis, a book on military technology, is published by Konrad Kyeser.
- Christine de Pizan writes The Book of the City of Ladies.

=== 1406 ===
==== January–March ====
- January 9 – Pope Innocent VII declares that Ladislaus is deposed as King of Naples, but refuses to acknowledge the order.
- January 16 – After the Venetian Republic is victorious in the War of Padua against Francesco Novello da Carrara, the Venetian Consejo de i Diexe (Council of Ten) concludes that Novello and his sons are too dangerous to be left alive. Novello is taken from his cell at the Doge's Palace, where he has been held since November 23, and is strangled to death. His sons Francesco and Giacomo are executed the next day.
- January 22 – Abū al-Faḍl Al-Musta'in becomes the new Abbasid caliph of Cairo, spiritual leader of the Muslim faith in the Mamluk Sultanate of Egypt, succeeding his father, Al-Mutawakkil I.
- February 14 – Scottish nobles Henry II Sinclair, Earl of Orkney and David Fleming of Biggar are assigned by King Robert III to transport the Crown Prince James to Bass Rock at the Firth of Forth to be evacuated to France. The group is ambushed by Robert Stewart, Duke of Albany at Long Hermiston Moor. Fleming is killed in battle, but Orkney is able to escape with Prince James and, after rescue, to board a ship to cross the English Channel.
- February 23 – (4 Ramadan 808 AH) Pir Muhammad bin Jahangir is forced to retreat from the forces of Khalil Sultan after attempting an invasion of Transoxiana during the confusion after the death of Tamerlane.
- February 26 – The Scottish Parliament issues a proclamation that during meetings of the body "a lighted lantern is to be hung outsideeach house every night in the high streets and lanes."
- March 22 – On "Monday before the Annunciation", Prince James, the 10-year-old son of King Robert III of Scotland, is captured while being taken across the English Channel from Scotland to France when the ship he is on, Maryenknyght, by privateers Hugh atte Fen, William Oxeney, John Hacon and Nicholas Steyward of Cley. The crown prince is delivered to London where he is held hostage by King Henry IV of England for the next 18 years.

==== April–June ====
- April 4 –
  - James I becomes King of Scotland on the death of his father. He has been detained by Henry IV of England since March 30 and will remain at the English court for 18 years. With James absent, Robert Stewart, Duke of Albany administers the kingdom as "Governor of Scotland".
  - Tran Thien Binh, pretender to the throne of Vietnam (at the time, Dai Ngu) arrives from China, accompanied by an emissary from China, at the invitation of the Emperor Hồ Hán Thương. After crossing into Lang Son, Tran Thien Binh and the Chinese ambassador are killed by King Ho Han Thuong's troops, triggering a war with China.
- May 11 – Ming conquest of Đại Ngu: China's Emperor Chengzu sends two battalions to invade the Kingdom of Dai Ngu (now Vietnam) under the command of the Duke Zhu Neng.
- May 21 – Pope Innocent VII issues the bull Piae Postulatio to protect the charity and hospice of Santa Maria dell'Anima (Saint Mary of the Soul), located in Rome and serving the German-speaking community.
- May 22 – In Germany, troops under the command of Johann von Paderborn, Bishop of Hildesheim, use cannons to destroy the walls of Gebhardshagen Castle in Salzgitter in what is now Lower Saxony.
- June 4 – The Chinese merchant Chen Yanxiang and his crew of 121 people depart from Java to Korea on the pretext of being Java's ambassador to Korea. His djong ship carries with it with various Southeast Asian products, including parrots, peacocks, agarwood, camphor, and black pepper.

==== July–September ====
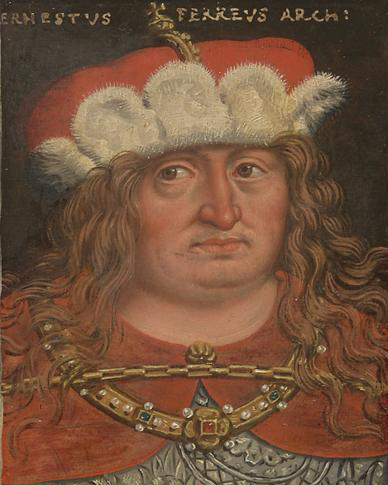
Ernst der Eiserne

- July 15 – Ernst der Eiserne of the Habsburg line becomes the new Duke of Austria, specifically for Inner Austria comprising the duchies of Styria, Carinthia and Carniola, succeeding his father, the late Wilhelm the Courteous.
- July 16 – In China's invasion of Vietnam, the Chinese imperial court issues the "Edict to Invade Annam", listing "20 formal reasons" for preparing to conquer the Kingdoms of Annam and Dai Ngu.
- August 14 – Chen Yanxiang and his crew of 121 people, sailing to Korea for trading, come under attack by 15 ships of Japanese pirates (Wokou) off of the coast of Gunsan. After a two day battle, 80 of the crew are dead and the ship is looted, but remains with Chen. The 40 survivors are able to reach the Korean shore.
- August 25 – China's Imperial Court sends a delegation to Inwa, capital of the Kingdom of Ava (now part of Myanmar) to persuade King Minkhaung I to cease attacking the Shan States, particularly Mohnyin.
- September 11 – At Appenzell in what is now Switzerland, a group of nobles create the "Order of St. George's Shield" at Hegau in the Duchy of Swabia.

==== October–December ====
- October 7 – French troops comprising 1,000 men at arms land on the Channel Island of Jersey, and fight a battle against 3,000 defenders.
- October 12 – Chen Yanxiang and his surviving crew are hosted by King Taejong of Korea at Seoul. The State Council (Uijongbu) verifies in a letter to the rulers of Java confirming that the Korean ship had been attacked.
- October 13 – Richard Whittington is elected Lord Mayor of London for a second full term. He holds this office simultaneously, with that of Mayor of the Calais Staple.
- October 26 – Eric of Pomerania, ruler of the Kalmar Union, marries Philippa, daughter of Henry IV of England, in Lund Cathedral.
- October 27 – In gratitude to the King of Korea, Chinese merchant Chen Yanxiang trades his ship to Korea for a smaller vessel, then departs Korea, but runs into a storm while approaching Japan's Seto Inland Sea.
- November 19 – Chinese troops commanded by General Zhang Fu cross into Vietnam from Guanxi while those of Mu Sheng cross from Yunnan.
- November 30 – Cardinal Angelo Correr of is elected as Pope after a 12-day conclave in Rome to select a successor to Pope Innocent VII, who died on November 6. Correr, the Patriarch of Constantinople takes the regnal name of Pope Gregory XII as the 205th pope of the Roman Catholic Church.
- December 25 – John II becomes King of Castile aged 21 months on the death of his father.

==== Date unknown ====
- Construction of the Forbidden City begins in Beijing during the Chinese Ming dynasty.
- Pisa is subjugated by Florence.

=== 1407 ===
==== January–March ====
- January 20 – Ming–Việt War: China conquers Dong Do, the eastern capital of Dai Ngu (now Hanoi, capital of Vietnam, and follows six days later by conquering the western capital, Tay Do (now Thanh Hóa) on January 26.
- February 21 – Ming–Việt War: Hồ Nguyên Trừng, commander of the Vietnamese armada of 500 ships, launches a counterattack on invading Chinese ships on the Thai Binh River, but the Chinese forces use cannons to destroy the Viet fleet, killing as many as 10,000 of the defending forces.
- February 22 – Pir Muhammad Mirza, co-ruler of the Timurid Empire (Transoxiana) that encompasses what is now Iran and most of the Near East of Asia, is murdered by his vizier, Pir Ali Taz. He is succeeded by his cousin, Khalil Sultan, who becomes the sole ruler of Transoxiana until being overthrown in 1409.

==== April–June ====
- March 1 – Persian astronomer and mathematician Jamshid al-Kashi completes his treatise Sullam al-sama' ("The Ladder of the Sky")
- March 7 – At 12 years old, Gianfrancesco I Gonzaga becomes the new Marquis of Mantua, and area encompassing much of the Lombardy region of Italy, upon the death of his father, Francesco I Gonzaga.
- March 18 – Ming–Việt War: In Vietnam's Phung Hoa prefecture, the invading Chinese troops use a larger weapon, the da jiangjun chong cannon, to destroy more of the Viet ships.
- April 10 – After several invitations by the Emperor Cheng Zu of China, the lama Deshin Shekpa, the fifth Karmapa of the Karma Kagyu sect of Tibetan Buddhism, finally visits the Emperor at Nanjing, the Ming dynasty. In his 22-day visit, the Karmapa thrills the Ming court with alleged miracles that are recorded in a gigantic scroll, translated into five different languages. In a show of mystical prowess, Deshin Shekpa adds legitimacy to a questionable succession to the throne by Cheng Zu, who had killed his nephew the Jianwen Emperor in the culmination of a civil war. For his services to the Ming court, including his handling of the ceremonial rites of Cheng Zu's deceased parents, Deshin Shekpa is awarded the title Great Treasure Prince of Dharma (大寶法王).
- April 23 – The Banco di San Giorgio is founded by the government of the Republic of Genoa in Italy.
- May 4 – Ming–Việt War: A Vietnamese force of 70,000 troops attempts to stop the advance of the Chinese at the Hong River at the Ham Tu pass in what is now Vietnam's Hưng Yên province. With superior firepower, the Chinese kill over 10,000 Viet troops and capture hundreds of warships.
- May 8 – The Earl of Somerset resigns as Admiral of the North and West of the English Navy. The office will remain vacant until assumed by Thomas Beaufort, Duke of Exeter on September 21, 1408.*
- May 30 – Ming–Việt War: In a last ditch effort to stop the Chinese invasion, the Vietnamese forces fight a final battle at Thanh Hóa, where the Emperor Hon Han Thuong had moved his capital. The Viet force loses 10,000 additional soldiers and the Vietnamese royal family flees during the retreat.
- June 16 – Ming–Hồ War: Ho Han Thuong, Emperor of Vietnam (Dai Ngu) is captured by the Imperial Chinese Army along with his father, the former Emperor Hồ Quý Ly, completing the conquest of Vietnam by the Chinese Empire.

==== July–December ====
- October 5 – A group of high officials of the former Vietnamese government are put on trial before China's Emperor Cheng Zu at Nanjing, and charged with treason for killing the previous Vietnamese ruler. Most of the prisoners are executed.
- October 20 – The English Parliament is opened at Gloucester after being summoned on August 26 by King Henry IV, and is marked by arguments between the House of Lords and the House of Commons over primacy and initiation of money bills.
- November 20 – A solemn truce is agreed upon between John the Fearless, Duke of Burgundy and Louis I, Duke of Orléans under the auspices of John, Duke of Berry.
- November 23 – The Duke of Orleans is assassinated, and war breaks out again between the Burgundians and the Duke's followers.
- December 2 –
  - China's Emperor Cheng Zu sends an order to Marquis Zhang Fu, who had recently conquered Vietnam and executed many of its officials, to avoid harming any innocent Vietnamese civilians.
  - The English Parliament closes after having met for six weeks.
- December – The Yongle Encyclopedia, until the 21st century the largest encyclopedia of history, is completed in China after four years of work by 2,169 scholars at the Hanlin Academy and the Imperial University.

==== Date unknown ====
- Rudolfo Belenzani leads a revolt against Bishop Georg von Liechtenstein in Trento, Bishopric of Trent.
- David Holbache founds Oswestry School, in the Welsh Marches.
- Mateu Texidor finishes the Puente de la Trinidad bridge in Valencia, Spain.

=== 1408 ===
==== January–March ====
- January 12 – Western Schism: King Charles VI of France sends a letter to the Antipope Benedict XIII at Avignon, giving an ultimatum to Benedict and the other Avignon Papacy proponents to end the schism in the Roman Catholic Church against the Roman Obedience, headed by Pope Gregory XII. King Charles VI threatens that unless the schism ends by Ascension Day, 40 days after Easter (in 1408, April 24, with Ascension Day on June 3), France will end its support of the Avignon Obedience.
- January 13 – Appenzell Wars: In the Appenzell region of Switzerland, the alliance of the region with St. Gallen, the Bund ob dem See "alliance over the lake", referring to the nearby Lake Constance fails in its attempt to liberate the city of Bregenz from Austrian rule. The Bund is dissolved less than three months later.
- February 19 – Battle of Bramham Moor: A royalist army defeats the last remnants of the Percy Rebellion.
- March 14 – John of Bourbon, son of Louis II, Duke of Bourbon, is appointed as the Grand Chamberlain of France by King Charles VI.
- March – (late in the month of Tagu, which ended March 28, 769 ME) Ava–Hanthawaddy War: In Burma (now Myanmar), King Razdarit leads the invasion of the Kingdom of North Arakan and overthrows its ruler, Anawrahta of Launggyet, then has him executed.

==== April–June ====
- April 8 – Appenzell Wars: In the Appenzell region of Switzerland, the alliance of the region with St. Gallen, the ("alliance over the lake", referring to the nearby Lake Constance fails in its attempt to liberate the city of Bregenz from Austrian rule. From the Holy Roman Empire, King Rupert of Germany orders the dissolution of the Bund ob dem See.
- May 18 – Western Schism: In response to the January 12 ultimatum by France, the antipope Benedict publishes a bull directing the excommunication of anyone, including King Charles VI, who attempted to withdraw obedience to the Avignon Papacy. The bull, "a major tactical mistake" by Benedict, gives the leaders of the University of Paris a pretext to declare those who had carried the bull to be guilty of high treason, and to accuse Benedict to be guilty of an attack on the royal dignity and national honor. King Charles then withdraws further support of Pope Benedict and proclaims the neutrality of France in the schism between Avignon and Rome.
- May 28 – A representative of Burma's Kingdom of Ava apologizes to the Ming dynasty Emperor of China for the kingdom's occupation of China's vassals, the Shan States, particularly the Mongyang State, whose monarch was killed in 1406.
- June 15 – After receiving the news that France will no longer support his Avignon Obedience, the Antipope Benedict XIII issues the Bull Celestis altitudo, summoning the a council to meet on November 1 at the French city of Perpignan, and then flees from the French-controlled Italian region of Genoa to avoid arrest.

==== July–December ====
- July 2 – From Livorno, a group of 13 Roman Catholic Cardinals allied with Pope Gregory begins sending encyclical letters "to the princes and prelates of the Christian world" summoning them to the Council of Pisa, to take place on March 25, 1409, in order to end the Western Schism.
- August 20 – Abdul Majid Hassan, the Sultan of Brunei, sets off on a voyage to China at the invitation of the Emperor Cheng Zu and arrives in the capital, Nanjing, by September, becoming the first foreign monarch to make a peaceful visit the Chinese Empire. While visiting, the Sultan becomes ill and dies on October 19.
- September 16 – Thorstein Olafssøn marries Sigrid Bjørnsdatter in Hvalsey Church, in the last recorded event of the Norse history of Greenland.
- September 22 – Andronikos Palaiologos becomes the new Byzantine Emperor of Thessalonica after the death of his brother, John VIII Palaiologos.
- September 23 – Henry, Prince of Wales (later Henry V of England) retakes Aberystwyth from Owain Glyndŵr.
- October 19 – Awang Pateh Berbai, in Nanjing in China as part of the family accompanying his nephew, the Sultan Abdul Majid Hassan, becomes the new Sultan of Brunei when Abdul dies from an illness.
- November 15 – The Antipope Benedict XIII convenes the Council of Perpignan.
- December 5 – Emir Edigu of the Golden Horde reaches Moscow.
- December 13 – The Order of the Dragon is founded under King Sigismund of Hungary.

==== Date unknown ====
- The Moldavian town of Iaşi is first mentioned.
- The Yongle Encyclopedia is completed.
- Gotland passes under Danish rule.
- Zheng He delivers 300 virgins from Korea to the Chinese Emperor Cheng Zu.
- Mihail I becomes co-ruler of Wallachia, with his father Mircea cel Bătrân.

=== 1409 ===
==== January–March ====
- January 1 – The Welsh surrender Harlech Castle to the English.
- January 18 – The Decree of Kutná Hora strengthens the Bohemian nation at the cost of foreign, mostly German speaking students at the University of Prague. Over a thousand students leave Prague as a consequence, choosing instead the universities of Heidelberg and the new University of Leipzig established later in the year.
- February 15 – The Galle Trilingual Inscription, with inscriptions in three languages (Chinese, Tamil and Persian) is installed by the Chinese admiral Zheng He at Galle in Sri Lanka, where he has stopped while on his way home during the second of his treasure voyages.
- February 24 – Traveling in Valencia in Aragon, Father Joan Gilabert Jofré, known as "Padre Jofré", witnesses a mentally ill man being beaten by two young attackers. After rescuing the victim, Jofré resolves to create the Hospital dels Ignoscents, the world's first psychiatric hospital.
- March 25 – On the day of the Feast of the Annunciation, the Council of Pisa opens at the Cathedral of Pisa with 22 cardinals, four patriarchs and 80 bishops to seek an end to the Western Schism and resolve the conflict between Pope Gregory XII of the Rome and Antipope Benedict XIII of Avignon.

==== April–June ====
- April 25 – Hussite Wars: King Wenceslaus IV of Bohemia decides to stop fighting the war against the rebel Jan Žižka in Budějovice.
- May 10 – The Council of Pisa votes on the matter of whether to remove the warring popes Gregory XII and Benedict XIII. All but two of the clerics present vote for them to be deposed, with the exception of Cardinal Gui de Maillesec and Cardinal Niccolò Brancaccio, who ask for more time to consider.
- May 13 – The Timurid War of Succession comes to an end as Khalil Sultan surrenders Samarkand to Shah Rukh, ruler of the Timurid Empire since 1405. Shah Rukh installs his son Ulugh Beg as Governor of Transoxiana. Shah Rukh then appoints Khalil as Governor of Shahr-e Rey in modern-day Iran.
- May 18 – Pir Muhammad, the son of Timurid Emperor Umar Shaikh, is assassinated near Shiraz by his own soldiers.
- May 26 – The second Samogitian Uprising begins in modern-day Lithuania against the Teutonic Knights who had been granted the rights to the Duchy of Samogita by the Peace of Raciążek in 1402.
- June 5 – The Council of Pisa issues the order deposing both Gregory XII and Benedict XIII who are responsible for the Western Schism.
- June 26 – By order of the Council of Pisa, Pietro Filargo is crowned as Pope Alexander V, producing the anomaly of three different popes of the Roman Catholic church.
- June 27 – Bohemia's King Wenceslaus pardons rebel leader Jan Zizka, and orders the city of Budejovice to do so as well.

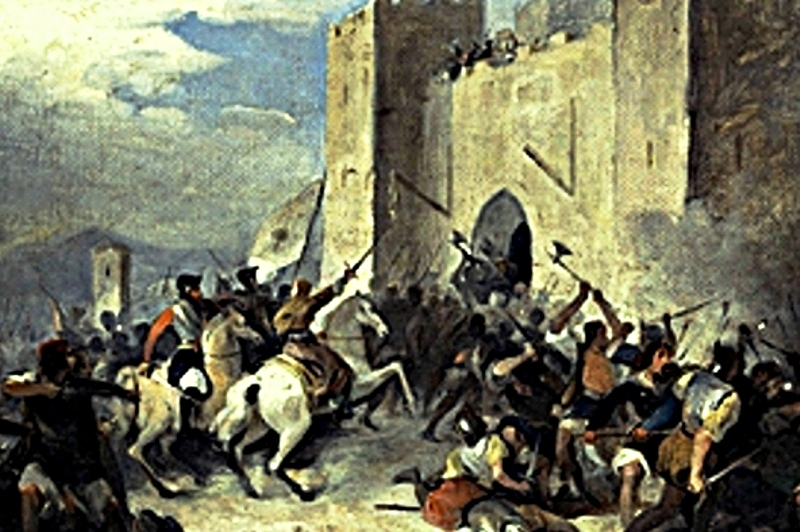
The Battle of Sanluri

- June 30 – The Battle of Sanluri is fought at Sardinia between the Kingdom of Sicily and the Judicate of Arborea.

==== July–September ====
- July 9 – The Republic of Venice, led by the Doge Michele Steno, gains control of both sides of the Adriatic Sea by purchasing the Dalmatian coast (bordered in modern times by Slovenia and Croatia) from King Ladislaus the Magnanimous, ruler of the Kingdom of Naples for 100,000 ducats, or 350 kilograms of gold.
- July 25 – Martin I, King of Aragon, becomes King Martin II of Sicily upon the death of his son, Martin I of Sicily.
- August 6 – The Polish–Lithuanian–Teutonic War breaks out between the Teutonic Knights and the allied Kingdom of Poland and Grand Duchy of Lithuania.
- August 7 – The Council of Pisa closes.
- September 9 – The new Pope Alexander V issues a papal bull granting a charter to the University of Leipzig.

==== October–December ====
- October 7 – Jean de Montagu, Grand Master of France and a leading advisor to the mentally unstable King Charles VI of France, is arrested on orders of John the Fearless, Duke of Burgundy. Montagu is public beheaded 10 days later at the Gibbet of Montfaucon in Paris.
- October 26 –
  - Representatives of the Venetian Republic (in modern-day Italy) and the Principality of Zeta (part of modern-day Serbia) sign a peace treaty to halt the First Scutari War for one year.
  - King Henry IV of England summons the English Parliament to assemble, starting on January 27.
- November 23 – King Henry IV of England sends a letter to all leading nobles, including a warning to them to have no further communication or entreaty with the Welsh rebel Owain Glyndŵr.
- December 2 – The University of Leipzig opens.
- December 9 – Louis II of Anjou founds the University of Aix-en-Provence.

==== Date unknown ====
- Ulugh Beg becomes governor of Samarkand.
- The Republic of Venice purchases the port of Zadar from Hungary.
- Grand Master Ulrich von Jungingen of the Teutonic Knights guarantees peace with the Kalmar Union of Scandinavia by selling the Baltic Sea island of Gotland to Queen Margaret of Denmark, Norway and Sweden.
- Cheng Ho (or Zheng He), admiral of the Ming empire fleet, deposes the king of Sri Lanka.
- Mircea cel Bătrân of Wallachia successfully defends Silistra against the Ottomans

== Births ==
1400

- January 13 – Infante John of Portugal, the Constable (d. 1442)
- March 15 – Guillaume Jouvenel des Ursins, Justice Minister of France (d. 1472)
- May 19 – John Stourton, 1st Baron Stourton, English baron (d. 1462)
- June 14 – Joan Ramon II, Count of Cardona (d. 1471)
- July 26 – Isabel le Despenser, Countess of Worcester, English noble (d. 1439)
- October 24 – Mani' ibn Rabi'a al-Muraydi, oldest known ancestor of the House of Al Sa'ud (d. 1463)
- December 25 – John Sutton, 1st Baron Dudley, Lord Lieutenant of Ireland (d. 1487)
- date unknown
  - James Tuchet, 5th Baron Audley (d. 1459)
  - Luca della Robbia, Florentine sculptor (d. 1482)
  - Isabella, Duchess of Lorraine (d. 1453).
  - James of Sclavonia, Croatian friar (d. April 1485 or 1496)
  - Gennadius Scholarius, Byzantine Greek philosopher and theologian, and Ecumenical Patriarch of Constantinople (d. 1473)
  - Richard Neville, 5th Earl of Salisbury, English politician (d. 1460)
  - Owen Tudor, Welsh courtier (d. 1461)
  - Jacopo Bellini, Italian painter (d. 1470)
  - Rogier van der Weyden, Dutch painter (or 1399)
  - Hans Multscher, German painter and sculptor (d. 1467)
  - Helene Kottanner, Hungarian writer and courtier (d. after 1470)
  - Ausiàs March, medieval Valencian poet and knight (d. 1459)
  - Henry, Duke of Villena (d. 1445)
  - Gonçalo Velho Cabral, Portuguese monk, Commander in the Order of Christ, explorer, and hereditary landowner (d. 1460)
  - Manuel Fokas, Greek Byzantine painter (d. after 1454)
  - Gilles Binchois, Franco-Flemish composer (d. 1460)
  - Hang Jebat, closest companion of the legendary Malaccan hero Hang Tuah
  - Alexander of Masovia, Polish prince member of the House of Piast and Bishop of Trento (d. 1444)
  - Andrea Grego, Dominican friar and preacher (d. 1485)
  - Andronikos V Palaiologos, Byzantine ruler of Thessalonica and surrounding territories alongside his father John VII Palaiologos (d. 1407)
  - Thomas Boleyn, Master of Gonville Hall, Cambridge and English priest (d. 1472)
  - Vettore Cappello, merchant, statesman and military commander of the Republic of Venice (d. 1467)
  - Domenico Capranica, Italian theologian, canonist, statesman, and cardinal (d. 1458)
  - Pietru Caxaro, Maltese philosopher and poet (d. 1485)
  - Eleanor, Duchess of Gloucester noblewoman, first the mistress and then the second wife of Humphrey, Duke of Gloucester (d. 1452)
- probable
  - Marina Nani, Venetian dogaressa (d. 1473)
  - Giovanna Dandolo, Venetian dogaressa (d. after 1462)
  - Johannes Gutenberg (d. 1468)

1401

- March 27 – Albert III, Duke of Bavaria-Munich (d. 1460)
- May 10 – Thomas Tuddenham, Landowner (d. 1462)
- May 12 – Emperor Shōkō of Japan (d. 1428)
- July 23 – Francesco I Sforza, Italian condottiero (d. 1466)
- September 14 – Maria of Castile, Queen of Aragon, Queen consort of Aragon and Naples (d. 1458)
- October 27 – Catherine of Valois, queen consort of England from 1420 until 1422 (d. 1437)
- November 26 – Henry Beaufort, 2nd Earl of Somerset (d. 1418)
- December 21 – Tommaso Masaccio, Italian painter (d. 1428)
- date unknown
  - Charles I, Duke of Bourbon (d. 1456)
  - Jacqueline, Countess of Hainaut (d. 1436)
- probable – Nicholas of Cusa, German philosopher, mathematician and astronomer (d. 1464)

1402

- February 6 – Louis I, Landgrave of Hesse, Landgrave of Hesse (1413-1458) (d. 1458)
- April 28 – Nezahualcoyotl, Acolhuan philosopher, warrior, poet and tlatoani of Texcoco (d. 1472)
- May 2 – Eleanor of Aragon, Queen of Portugal (d. 1445)
- June 7 – Ichijō Kaneyoshi, Japanese court noble (d. 1481)
- September 29 – Ferdinand the Holy Prince of Portugal (d. 1443)
- November 23 – Jean de Dunois, French nobleman and soldier, illegitimate son of Louis I (d. 1468)
- date unknown – Humphrey Stafford, 1st Duke of Buckingham, English nobleman (d. 1460)

1403

- January 2 – Basilios Bessarion, Latin Patriarch of Constantinople (d. 1472)
- February 22 – King Charles VII of France, monarch of the House of Valois, King of France from 1422 to his death (d. 1461)
- June 11 – John IV, Duke of Brabant, son of Antoine (d. 1427)
- August 11 – Ravenna Petrova, Princess of Amara Palace, daughter of William Hamilton and Anita Petrova. (d. 1423)
- September 1 – Louis VIII, Duke of Bavaria, German noble (d. 1445)
- September 25 – Louis III of Anjou (d. 1434)
- September 29 – Elisabeth of Brandenburg, Duchess of Brzeg-Legnica and Cieszyn, German princess (d. 1449)
- date unknown
  - Robert Wingfield, English politician (d. 1454)
  - John IV, Emperor of Trebizond (d. 1459)

1404

- January 18 – Sir Philip Courtenay, British noble (d. 1463)
- February 14 – Leon Battista Alberti, Italian painter, poet, and philosopher (d. 1472)
- March 25 (bapt.) – John Beaufort, 1st Duke of Somerset, English military leader (d. 1444)
- June – Murad II, Ottoman Sultan (d. 1451)
- July 6 – Yamana Sōzen, Japanese warlord and monk (d. 1473)
- July 25 – Philip I, Duke of Brabant (d. 1430)
- September 30 – Anne of Burgundy (d. 1432)
- October 14 – Marie of Anjou, queen of Charles VII of France (d. 1463)

1405

- February 8 – Constantine XI, last Byzantine Emperor (d. 1453)
- February 22 – Gilbert Kennedy, 1st Lord Kennedy, Scottish noble (d. 1489)
- March 6 – King John II of Castile (d. 1454)
- May 6 – George Kastrioti, better known as Skanderbeg, Albanian national hero (d. 1468) (probable date)
- October 18 – Pope Pius II (d. 1464)
- date unknown – Louis I, Count of Montpensier (d. 1486)
  - Cecilia of Brandenburg, Duchess of Brunswick-Wolfenbüttel (d. 1449)

1406

- January 28 – Guy XIV de Laval, French noble (d. 1486)
- July 11 – William, Margrave of Hachberg-Sausenberg, Margrave of Hachberg-Sausenberg (1428-1441) (d. 1482)
- September 26 – Thomas de Ros, 8th Baron de Ros, English soldier and politician (d. 1430)
- date unknown
  - John, Margrave of Brandenburg-Kulmbach (d. 1464)
  - Margaret, Countess of Vertus, French countess (d. 1466)
  - Martin of Aragon, Aragon infante (d. 1407)
  - Ulrich II, Count of Celje (d. 1456)
- probable date
  - Iancu de Hunedoara – governor of Hungary (d. 1456)

1407

- March 15 – Jacob, Margrave of Baden-Baden (1431-1453) (d. 1453)
- August 27 – Ashikaga Yoshikazu, Japanese shōgun (d. 1425)
- September 21 – Leonello d'Este, Marquis of Ferrara, Italian noble (d. 1450)
- November 8 – Alain de Coëtivy, Catholic cardinal (d. 1474)
- date unknown
  - Thomas de Littleton, English judge (d. 1481)
  - Marguerite, bâtarde de France, French noble, illegitimate daughter of the King of France (d. 1458)
  - Demetrios Palaiologos, Byzantine prince (d. 1470)
  - Lorenzo Valla, Italian humanist, philosopher, literary critic (d. 1457)

1408

- January 25 – Katharina of Hanau, German countess regent (d. 1460)
- February 14 – John FitzAlan, 14th Earl of Arundel (d. 1435)
- March 25 – Agnes of Baden, Countess of Holstein-Rendsburg, German noble (d. 1473)
- April 8 – Jadwiga of Lithuania, Polish princess (d. 1431)
- April 23 – John de Vere, 12th Earl of Oxford, English noble (d. 1462)
- May 22 – Annamacharya, Indian mystic saint composer (d. 1503)
- October 1 or 1409 – Karl Knutsson, King of Sweden (d. 1470)

1409

- January 16 – René of Anjou, king of Naples (d. 1480)
- March 2 – Jean II, Duke of Alençon, son of John I of Alençon and Marie of Brittany (d. 1476)
- March 12 – Isabella of Urgell, Duchess of Coimbra, Portuguese Duchess (d. 1459)
- September 13 – Joan of Valois, Duchess of Alençon, French duchess (d. 1432)
- October 7 – Elizabeth of Luxembourg (d. 1442)
- October 21 – Alessandro Sforza, Italian condottiero (d. 1473)
- date unknown – Bernardo Rossellino, Florentine sculptor and architect

== Deaths ==
1400

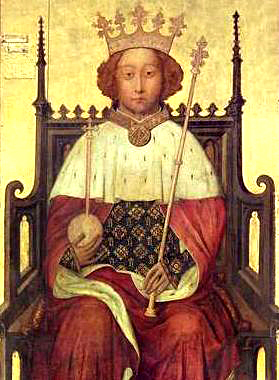
Richard II of England

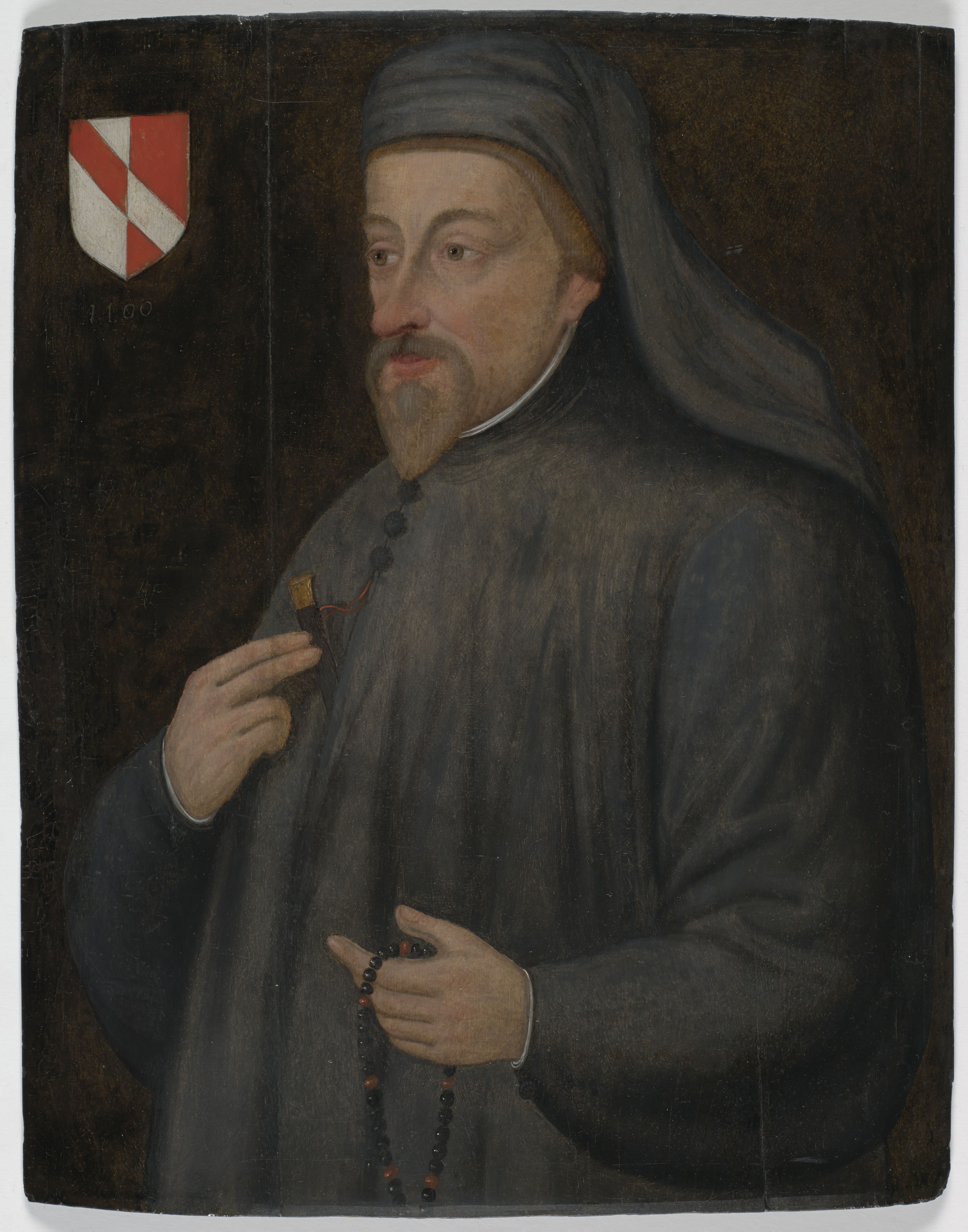
Geoffrey Chaucer

- January 7
  - Thomas Holland, 1st Duke of Surrey, English politician (executed) (b. 1374)
  - John Montagu, 3rd Earl of Salisbury, English earl (executed) (b. 1350)
- January 13 – Thomas le Despenser, 1st Earl of Gloucester, English politician (executed) (b. 1373)
- January 16 – John Holland, 1st Duke of Exeter, English politician (executed)
- February 14 – King Richard II of England, (probably murdered) (b. 1367)
- April 21 – John Wittlebury, English politician (b. 1333)
- April 23 – Aubrey de Vere, 10th Earl of Oxford, third son of John de Vere (b. 1338)
- April 28 – Baldus de Ubaldis, Italian jurist (b. 1327)
- June 5 – Frederick I, Duke of Brunswick-Lüneburg, rival King of the Romans
- June 17 – Jan of Jenštejn, Archbishop of Prague (b. 1348)
- October 25 – Geoffrey Chaucer, English poet (b. c. 1343)
- November 8 – Peter of Aragon, Aragonese infante (b. 1398)
- November 20 – Elizabeth of Moravia, Margravine of Meissen (b. 1355)
- November – Tarabya of Ava (b. 1368)
- December – Archibald the Grim, Scottish magnate (b. 1328)
- date unknown – Narayana Pandit, Indian mathematician (b. 1340)

1401

- January 19 – Robert Bealknap, British justice
- March – William Sawtrey, English Lollard martyr (burned at the stake)
- April 8 or August 8 – Thomas de Beauchamp, 12th Earl of Warwick (b. 1338)
- May 25 – Queen Maria of Sicily (b. 1363)
- September 14 – Dobrogost of Nowy Dwór, Polish bishop (b. 1355)
- October – Anabella Drummond, queen of Scotland
- October 19 – John Charleton, 4th Baron Cherleton (b. 1362)
- October 20 – Klaus Störtebeker, German pirate
- November 25 – King Tarabya of Ava (b. 1368)
- date unknown – Andronikos Asen Zaccaria, Baron of Chalandritsa and Arcadia, Grand Constable of Achaea

1402

- March 26 – David Stewart, Duke of Rothesay, heir to the throne of Scotland (b. 1378)
- May 3 – João Anes, Archbishop of Lisbon
- June 26 – Giovanni I Bentivoglio, Ruler of Bologna (b. 1358)
- July 13 – Jianwen Emperor of China (b. 1377)
- August 1 – Edmund of Langley, 1st Duke of York, son of King Edward III of England (b. 1341)
- September 3 – Gian Galeazzo Visconti, first Duke of Milan (b. 1351)
- date unknown
  - Empress Ma (Jianwen) of China (b. 1378)
  - Hywel Sele, Welsh nobleman

1403

- March 8 – Beyazid, Ottoman Sultan (b. 1354)
- April 27 – Maria of Bosnia, Countess of Helfenstein (b. 1335)
- April – Đurađ II Stracimirović, Serbian nobleman from the House of Balšić in Zeta
- May 10 – Katherine Swynford, Duchess of Lancaster, spouse of John of Gaunt
- May 12 – William de Lode, English prior
- July 21 (at the Battle of Shrewsbury)
  - Sir Walter Blount, English soldier, standard-bearer of Henry IV (in battle)
  - Edmund Stafford, 5th Earl of Stafford, English soldier (in battle)
  - Henry 'Hotspur' Percy, English rebel (in battle)
- July 23 – Thomas Percy, 1st Earl of Worcester, English rebel (executed) (b. 1343)
- date unknown – Vukosav Nikolić, Bosnian nobleman (in battle)
- date unknown - Sharaf al-Din Isma'il al-Jabarti, Somali scholar and politician
- probable date – Hajji Zayn al-Attar, Persian physician

1404

- April 27 – Philip II, Duke of Burgundy (b. 1342)
- September 14 – Albert IV, Duke of Austria (b. 1377)
- September 27 – William of Wykeham, English bishop and statesman (b. 1320)
- October 1 – Pope Boniface IX (b. 1356)
- October 15 – Marie Valois, French princess (b. 1344)
- December 13 – Albert I, Duke of Bavaria (b. 1336)
- date unknown – Eleanor of Arborea, ruler of Sardinia (b. 1350)

1405

- January 12 – Eleanor Maltravers, English noblewoman (b. 1345)
- February 14 – Timur (aka Tamerlane), Turco-Mongol monarch and conqueror (b. 1336)
- March 16 – Margaret III, Countess of Flanders (b. 1350)
- April 19 – Thomas West, 1st Baron West (b. 1335)
- May 29 – Philippe de Mézières, advisor to Charles V of France
- June 8
  - Thomas de Mowbray, 4th Earl of Norfolk, English rebel, executed in York (b. 1385)
  - Richard le Scrope, Archbishop of York, executed in York (b. c.1350)
- c. July 20 – Alexander Stewart, Earl of Buchan, the "Wolf of Badenoch", fourth son of King Robert II of Scotland (b. 1343)
- probable – Jean Froissart, French chronicler (b. 1337)

1406

- January 6 – Roger Walden, English bishop
- March 17 – Ibn Khaldun, African Arab historian (b. 1332)
- April 4 – King Robert III of Scotland (b. 1337)
- May 4 – Coluccio Salutati, Chancellor of Florence (b. 1331)
- July 15 – William, Duke of Austria
- August 28 – John de Sutton V (b. 1380)
- September 16 – Cyprian, Metropolitan of Moscow
- November 1 – Joanna, Duchess of Brabant (b. 1322)
- November 6 – Pope Innocent VII (b. 1339)
- December 25 – King Henry III of Castile (b. 1379)
- probable date – Tokhtamysh, khan of the Golden Horde

1407

- February 9 – William I, Margrave of Meissen (b. 1343)
- February 16 – Abdallah Fakhr al-Din, religious leader
- March 7 – Francesco I Gonzaga, ruler of Mantua
- April 23 – Olivier de Clisson, French soldier (b. 1326)
- July – Empress Xu (Ming dynasty), Chinese Empress (b. 1362)
- November 23 – Louis I, Duke of Orléans, brother of Charles VI of France (murdered) (b. 1372)
- date unknown
  - Pero López de Ayala, Spanish soldier (b. 1332)
  - Kolgrim, Norse Greenlander and alleged sorcerer

1408

- January 13 – Coptic Pope Matthew I of Alexandria
- February 19 – Thomas Bardolf, 5th Baron Bardolf, English rebel (in battle)
- February 20 – Henry Percy, 1st Earl of Northumberland, English rebel (in battle) (b. 1341)
- April – Miran Shah, son of Timur the Lame (b. 1366)
- April 10 or April 11 – Elizabeth le Despenser, English noblewoman
- May 24 – Taejo of Joseon, ruler of Korea (b. 1335)
- May 31 – Ashikaga Yoshimitsu, Japanese shōgun (b. 1358)
- September 15 – Edmund Holland, 4th Earl of Kent (b. 1384)
- September 22 – John VII Palaiologos, Byzantine Emperor (b. 1370)
- December 4 – Valentina Visconti, Duchess of Orléans by marriage to Louis of Valois, Duke of Orléans

1409

- May 13 – Jan of Tarnów, Polish nobleman
- May 22 – Blanche of England, sister of King Henry V (b. 1392)
- July 25 – King Martin I of Sicily (b. 1374)
- September 13 – Isabella of Valois, French princess and queen of England (b. 1387)
- date unknown – Thomas Merke, English bishop
- probable – Edmund Mortimer, English rebel (b. 1376)
