= 1405 =

1405 in various calendars
- Gregorian calendar: 1405; MCDV
- Ab urbe condita: 2158
- Armenian calendar: 854; ԹՎ ՊԾԴ
- Assyrian calendar: 6155
- Balinese saka calendar: 1326–1327
- Bengali calendar: 811–812
- Berber calendar: 2355
- English Regnal year: 6 Hen. 4 – 7 Hen. 4
- Buddhist calendar: 1949
- Burmese calendar: 767
- Byzantine calendar: 6913–6914
- Chinese calendar: 甲申年 (Wood Monkey); 4102 or 3895 — to — 乙酉年 (Wood Rooster); 4103 or 3896
- Coptic calendar: 1121–1122
- Discordian calendar: 2571
- Ethiopian calendar: 1397–1398
- Hebrew calendar: 5165–5166
- Hindu calendars
- Vikram Samvat: 1461–1462
- Shaka Samvat: 1326–1327
- Kali Yuga: 4505–4506
- Holocene calendar: 11405
- Igbo calendar: 405–406
- Iranian calendar: 783–784
- Islamic calendar: 807–808
- Japanese calendar: Ōei 12 (応永１２年)
- Javanese calendar: 1319–1320
- Julian calendar: 1405; MCDV
- Korean calendar: 3738
- Minguo calendar: 507 before ROC 民前507年
- Nanakshahi calendar: −63
- Thai solar calendar: 1947–1948
- Tibetan calendar: ཤིང་ཕོ་སྤྲེ་ལོ་ (male Wood-Monkey); 1531 or 1150 or 378 — to — ཤིང་མོ་བྱ་ལོ་ (female Wood-Bird); 1532 or 1151 or 379

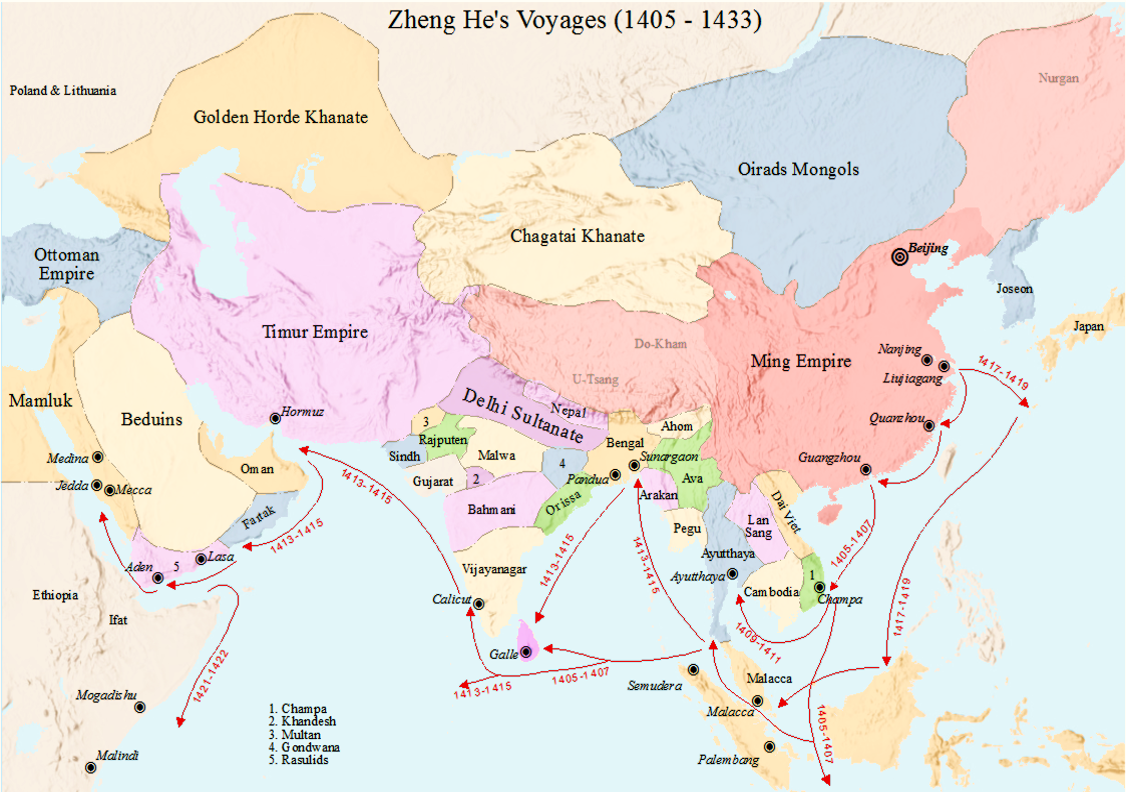
July 11: Chinese explorer Zheng He and his crew depart on their first exploration of the world.

Year 1405 (MCDV) was a common year starting on Thursday of the Julian calendar, the 1405th year of the Common Era (CE) and Anno Domini (AD) designations, the 405th year of the 2nd millennium, the 5th year of the 15th century, and the 6th year of the 1400s decade.

== Events ==
=== January–March ===
- January 19 – Upon the death of Prince Sigismund of Anhalt-Dessau (now within the federal state of Saxony-Anhalt in southeastern Germany), his four sons Waldemar IV, George, Albert V and Sigismund II become the joint rulers of the principality. Upon the death of Waldemar in 1417, Sigismund in 1452, and Albert in 1469, George I will reign alone for five more years until his death in 1474.
- February 20 – Khalil Sultan becomes the new ruler of the western side of the Timurid Empire upon the death of his grandfather, the Mongol conqueror Timur, while the son of Timur, Shah Rukh, becomes the ruler of the eastern side.
- March 18 – News reaches the Timurid Empire that Timur has died, and a period of mourning begins as he is interred at the Gur-e-Amir mausoleum in Samarkand, now in the Republic of Uzbekistan.
- March 21 – John the Fearless, already Duke of Burgundy, becomes the Count of Flanders upon the death of his mother, Margaret III, Countess of Flanders, bringing the French speakers of Burgundy and the Flemish speaking citizens of Flanders under common rule in what will later become the Kingdom of Belgium.
- March 31 – Antonio I Acciaioli, Duke of Athens, reaches an agreement with the Venetian Senate and with Michele Steno, Doge of Venice, for payment of reparations to Venice in return for being able to continue ruling Athens.

=== April–June ===
- April 11 – The three sons of Philip the Bold—John the Fearless, Philip II, and Anthony— agree at Arras to partition the Burgundian lands of their father between themselves, with John to retain Flanders, Philip to take the County of Nevers, and Anthony to retain Rethel as well to purchase the Duchy of Brabant from John.
- May 5 – At the Battle of Pwll Melyn, fought in Wales, Baron Grey of Codnor routs the Welsh rebels commanded by two sons and the brother of the rebel leader Owain Glyndwr. Owain's eldest son, Gruffud, is taken as a prisoner of war by the English, while the brother, Tudur ap Gruffudd, is killed in action.
- May 29 – In England, Ralph Neville, 1st Earl of Westmorland, meets Richard le Scrope, Archbishop of York and Earl of Norfolk Thomas Mowbray in Shipton Moor, tricks them to send their rebellious army home, and then imprisons them.
- June 8 – Richard le Scrope, Archbishop of York and Thomas Mowbray, Earl of Norfolk, are executed in York on Henry IV's orders.

=== July–September ===
- July 11 – Ming Dynasty fleet commander Zheng He sets sail from Suzhou, to explore the world for the first time.
- August 29 – Cardinal Angelo Acciaioli is appointed by Pope Innocent VII to be the Grand Chancellor of the Holy Roman Church, filling a vacancy that has existed since the death of Francesco Moricotti Prignani in 1394.
- September 20 – An-Nasir Faraj, the Mamluk Sultan of Egypt and Syria, flees Cairo and names his brother Izz al-Din Abd al-Aziz as the regent during his absence. Faraj returns two months later and reclaims the throne.

=== October–December ===
- October 5 – Christine de Pizan writes a letter to Queen Isabeau, urging her to intervene in the political struggle between the dukes of Burgundy and Orléans.
- November – As an aftermath to the War in Gotland (1403-1404), Queen Margaret I buys the rights to Visby for 8000 marks from Albrecht of Mecklenburg during negotiations in Flensburg. This strengthens the Kalmar Union and pushes out the Teutonic Order, angering grand master Konrad von Jungingen.
- November 17 – The Sultanate of Sulu is established on the Sulu Archipelago, off the coast of Mindanao in the Philippines.
- November 22 – The War of Padua in Italy comes to an end as Padua and Ferrara surrender to the armies of the Venetian Republic, commanded by General Malatesta IV. The Republic of Venice then annexes the territory of the defeated lordships.
- December 6 – King Zsigmond of Hungary marries for the second time, in a wedding to Barbara of Cilli.
- December 21 – King Henry IV of England summons the members of the "Long Parliament", the sixth session of the English House of Commons and the House of Lords, to assemble at Westminster on "March 1, 1405", the "old style" date for March 1, 1406.
- December 27 – The Imperial Chinese Army invades the Lan Na kingdom, covering an area now divided between Myanmar, Thailand and China's Yunnan province.

=== Date unknown ===
- The first record is written of whiskey being consumed in Ireland, where it is distilled by Catholic monks.
- Bellifortis, a book on military technology, is published by Konrad Kyeser.
- Christine de Pizan writes The Book of the City of Ladies.

== Births ==
- February 22 – Gilbert Kennedy, 1st Lord Kennedy, Scottish noble (d. 1489)
- March 6 – King John II of Castile (d. 1454)
- May 6 – George Kastrioti, better known as Skanderbeg, Albanian national hero (d. 1468) (probable date)
- October 18 – Pope Pius II (d. 1464)
- date unknown – Louis I, Count of Montpensier (d. 1486)
  - Cecilia of Brandenburg, Duchess of Brunswick-Wolfenbüttel (d. 1449)

== Deaths ==
- January 12 – Eleanor Maltravers, English noblewoman (b. 1345)
- February 14 – Timur (aka Tamerlane), Turco-Mongol monarch and conqueror (b. 1336)
- March 16 – Margaret III, Countess of Flanders (b. 1350)
- April 19 – Thomas West, 1st Baron West (b. 1335)
- May 29 – Philippe de Mézières, advisor to Charles V of France
- June 8
  - Thomas de Mowbray, 4th Earl of Norfolk, English rebel, executed in York (b. 1385)
  - Richard le Scrope, Archbishop of York, executed in York (b. c.1350)
- c. July 20 – Alexander Stewart, Earl of Buchan, the "Wolf of Badenoch", fourth son of King Robert II of Scotland (b. 1343)
- probable – Jean Froissart, French chronicler (b. 1337)
