= 1400s =

1400s may refer to:

- The century from 1400 to 1499, almost synonymous with the 15th century (1401–1500)
- 1400s (decade), the period from 1400 to 1409
