= The Greenlanders =

1988 novel by Jane Smiley

- First edition cover
- Author: Jane Smiley
- Cover artist: John Rush
- Language: English
- Publisher: Alfred A. Knopf
- Publication date: March 12, 1988
- Publication place: United States
- Media type: Print
- Pages: 558
- ISBN: 0-394-55120-6
- LC Class: PS3569.M39 G7 1988

The Greenlanders is a 1988 historical-fiction epic novel by American author Jane Smiley.

The novel gives a speculative account of the Norse inhabitation of Greenland in the 14th and 15th centuries, written in the style of an Icelandic or Norse saga.

== Plot ==
The Greenlanders describes the daily affairs of Nordic settlers living in medieval southern Greenland, including marriages, births, deaths, famines, epidemics, trials at the Thing, church affairs, land feuds, seal hunts, military invasions, and encounters with Greenland's aboriginal inhabitants.

In particular, the book follows the lives of Gunnar Asgeirsson, an unlucky, violent, litigious man, and his sister, Margret Asgeirsdottir, a quiet, solitary, melancholic woman on their homestead in the Vatnahverfi district. Though the novel also follows the lives of many other Greenlanders, Gunnar and Margret function as the novel's protagonists. The novel also features several historically documented individuals and events in Greenland and elsewhere, including the spread of Islam into southern Europe, assaults on Greenlanders' settlements by English raiders, and the witchcraft trial of Kolgrim.

== Reception ==
The Greenlanders was reviewed favorably. Kirkus Reviews called it a "bleak, stirring picture of the slow slouch towards the death of a civilization". In a 2010 Time article, American author Jonathan Franzen included it in his list of influential books, and in an interview with Big Think, Franzen said, "I do not know of a better American novel within the last twenty years" than The Greenlanders.
