= 1406 =

1406 in various calendars
- Gregorian calendar: 1406; MCDVI
- Ab urbe condita: 2159
- Armenian calendar: 855; ԹՎ ՊԾԵ
- Assyrian calendar: 6156
- Balinese saka calendar: 1327–1328
- Bengali calendar: 812–813
- Berber calendar: 2356
- English Regnal year: 7 Hen. 4 – 8 Hen. 4
- Buddhist calendar: 1950
- Burmese calendar: 768
- Byzantine calendar: 6914–6915
- Chinese calendar: 乙酉年 (Wood Rooster); 4103 or 3896 — to — 丙戌年 (Fire Dog); 4104 or 3897
- Coptic calendar: 1122–1123
- Discordian calendar: 2572
- Ethiopian calendar: 1398–1399
- Hebrew calendar: 5166–5167
- Hindu calendars
- Vikram Samvat: 1462–1463
- Shaka Samvat: 1327–1328
- Kali Yuga: 4506–4507
- Holocene calendar: 11406
- Igbo calendar: 406–407
- Iranian calendar: 784–785
- Islamic calendar: 808–809
- Japanese calendar: Ōei 13 (応永１３年)
- Javanese calendar: 1320–1321
- Julian calendar: 1406; MCDVI
- Korean calendar: 3739
- Minguo calendar: 506 before ROC 民前506年
- Nanakshahi calendar: −62
- Thai solar calendar: 1948–1949
- Tibetan calendar: ཤིང་མོ་བྱ་ལོ་ (female Wood-Bird); 1532 or 1151 or 379 — to — མེ་ཕོ་ཁྱི་ལོ་ (male Fire-Dog); 1533 or 1152 or 380

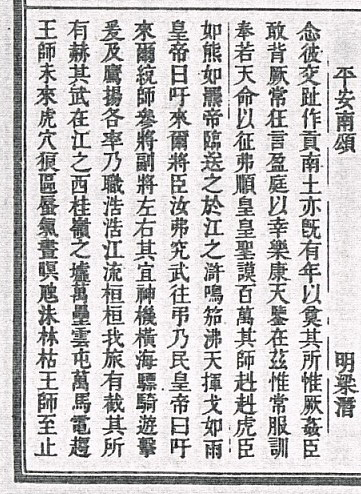
July 16: China's Emperor Cheng Zu issues the "Edict to Invade Annam", listing 20 reasons for the need to conquer Vietnam.

Year 1406 (MCDVI) was a common year starting on Friday of the Julian calendar.

== Events ==
=== January–March ===
- January 9 – Pope Innocent VII declares that Ladislaus is deposed as King of Naples, but refuses to acknowledge the order.
- January 16 – After the Venetian Republic is victorious in the War of Padua against Francesco Novello da Carrara, the Venetian Consejo de i Diexe (Council of Ten) concludes that Novello and his sons are too dangerous to be left alive. Novello is taken from his cell at the Doge's Palace, where he has been held since November 23, and is strangled to death. His sons Francesco and Giacomo are executed the next day.
- January 22 – Abū al-Faḍl Al-Musta'in becomes the new Abbasid caliph of Cairo, spiritual leader of the Muslim faith in the Mamluk Sultanate of Egypt, succeeding his father, Al-Mutawakkil I.
- February 14 – Scottish nobles Henry II Sinclair, Earl of Orkney and David Fleming of Biggar are assigned by King Robert III to transport the Crown Prince James to Bass Rock at the Firth of Forth to be evacuated to France. The group is ambushed by Robert Stewart, Duke of Albany at Long Hermiston Moor. Fleming is killed in battle, but Orkney is able to escape with Prince James and, after rescue, to board a ship to cross the English Channel.
- February 23 – (4 Ramadan 808 AH) Pir Muhammad bin Jahangir is forced to retreat from the forces of Khalil Sultan after attempting an invasion of Transoxiana during the confusion after the death of Tamerlane.
- February 26 – The Scottish Parliament issues a proclamation that during meetings of the body "a lighted lantern is to be hung outsideeach house every night in the high streets and lanes."
- March 22 – On "Monday before the Annunciation", Prince James, the 10-year-old son of King Robert III of Scotland, is captured while being taken across the English Channel from Scotland to France when the ship he is on, Maryenknyght, by privateers Hugh atte Fen, William Oxeney, John Hacon and Nicholas Steyward of Cley. The crown prince is delivered to London where he is held hostage by King Henry IV of England for the next 18 years.

=== April–June ===
- April 4 –
  - James I becomes King of Scotland on the death of his father. He has been detained by Henry IV of England since March 30 and will remain at the English court for 18 years. With James absent, Robert Stewart, Duke of Albany administers the kingdom as "Governor of Scotland".
  - Tran Thien Binh, pretender to the throne of Vietnam (at the time, Dai Ngu) arrives from China, accompanied by an emissary from China, at the invitation of the Emperor Hồ Hán Thương. After crossing into Lang Son, Tran Thien Binh and the Chinese ambassador are killed by King Ho Han Thuong's troops, triggering a war with China.
- May 11 – Ming conquest of Đại Ngu: China's Emperor Chengzu sends two battalions to invade the Kingdom of Dai Ngu (now Vietnam) under the command of the Duke Zhu Neng.
- May 21 – Pope Innocent VII issues the bull Piae Postulatio to protect the charity and hospice of Santa Maria dell'Anima (Saint Mary of the Soul), located in Rome and serving the German-speaking community.
- May 22 – In Germany, troops under the command of Johann von Paderborn, Bishop of Hildesheim, use cannons to destroy the walls of Gebhardshagen Castle in Salzgitter in what is now Lower Saxony.
- June 4 – The Chinese merchant Chen Yanxiang and his crew of 121 people depart from Java to Korea on the pretext of being Java's ambassador to Korea. His djong ship carries with it with various Southeast Asian products, including parrots, peacocks, agarwood, camphor, and black pepper.

=== July–September ===
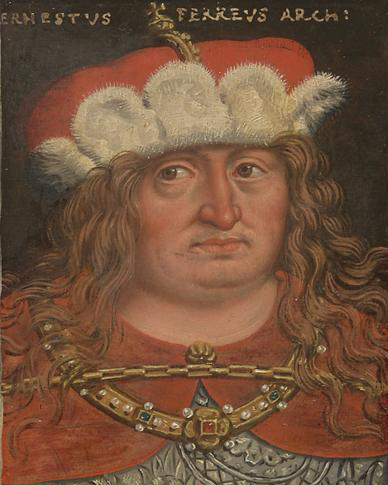
Ernst der Eiserne

- July 15 – Ernst der Eiserne of the Habsburg line becomes the new Duke of Austria, specifically for Inner Austria comprising the duchies of Styria, Carinthia and Carniola, succeeding his father, the late Wilhelm the Courteous.
- July 16 – In China's invasion of Vietnam, the Chinese imperial court issues the "Edict to Invade Annam", listing "20 formal reasons" for preparing to conquer the Kingdoms of Annam and Dai Ngu.
- August 14 – Chen Yanxiang and his crew of 121 people, sailing to Korea for trading, come under attack by 15 ships of Japanese pirates (Wokou) off of the coast of Gunsan. After a two day battle, 80 of the crew are dead and the ship is looted, but remains with Chen. The 40 survivors are able to reach the Korean shore.
- August 25 – China's Imperial Court sends a delegation to Inwa, capital of the Kingdom of Ava (now part of Myanmar) to persuade King Minkhaung I to cease attacking the Shan States, particularly Mohnyin.
- September 11 – At Appenzell in what is now Switzerland, a group of nobles create the "Order of St. George's Shield" at Hegau in the Duchy of Swabia.

=== October–December ===
- October 7 – French troops comprising 1,000 men at arms land on the Channel Island of Jersey, and fight a battle against 3,000 defenders.
- October 12 – Chen Yanxiang and his surviving crew are hosted by King Taejong of Korea at Seoul. The State Council (Uijongbu) verifies in a letter to the rulers of Java confirming that the Korean ship had been attacked.
- October 13 – Richard Whittington is elected Lord Mayor of London for a second full term. He holds this office simultaneously, with that of Mayor of the Calais Staple.
- October 26 – Erik of Pomerania, ruler of the Kalmar Union, marries Philippa, daughter of Henry IV of England, in Lund Cathedral.
- October 27 – In gratitude to the King of Korea, Chinese merchant Chen Yanxiang trades his ship to Korea for a smaller vessel, then departs Korea, but runs into a storm while approaching Japan's Seto Inland Sea.
- November 19 – Chinese troops commanded by General Zhang Fu cross into Vietnam from Guanxi while those of Mu Sheng cross from Yunnan.
- November 30 – Cardinal Angelo Correr of is elected as Pope after a 12-day conclave in Rome to select a successor to Pope Innocent VII, who died on November 6. Correr, the Patriarch of Constantinople takes the regnal name of Pope Gregory XII as the 205th pope of the Roman Catholic Church.
- December 25 – John II becomes King of Castile aged 21 months on the death of his father.

=== Date unknown ===
- Construction of the Forbidden City begins in Beijing during the Chinese Ming dynasty.
- Pisa is subjugated by Florence.

== Births ==
- January 28 – Guy XIV de Laval, French noble (d. 1486)
- July 11 – William, Margrave of Hachberg-Sausenberg, Margrave of Hachberg-Sausenberg (1428-1441) (d. 1482)
- September 26 – Thomas de Ros, 8th Baron de Ros, English soldier and politician (d. 1430)
- date unknown
  - John, Margrave of Brandenburg-Kulmbach (d. 1464)
  - Margaret, Countess of Vertus, French countess (d. 1466)
  - Martin of Aragon, Aragon infante (d. 1407)
  - Ulrich II, Count of Celje (d. 1456)
- probable date
  - Iancu de Hunedoara – governor of Hungary (d. 1456)

== Deaths ==
- January 6 – Roger Walden, English bishop
- March 17 – Ibn Khaldun, African Arab historian (b. 1332)
- April 4 – King Robert III of Scotland (b. 1337)
- May 4 – Coluccio Salutati, Chancellor of Florence (b. 1331)
- July 15 – William, Duke of Austria
- August 28 – John de Sutton V (b. 1380)
- September 16 – Cyprian, Metropolitan of Moscow
- November 1 – Joanna, Duchess of Brabant (b. 1322)
- November 6 – Pope Innocent VII (b. 1339)
- December 25 – King Henry III of Castile (b. 1379)
- probable date – Tokhtamysh, khan of the Golden Horde
