= Thanh Hóa =

Thanh Hoá may refer to:

- Thanh Hóa province, a province in north central coast region of Vietnam
- Thanh Hóa (city), former provincial city of Thanh Hóa province
- Thanh Hóa Bridge, on the Song Ma River northeast of the city of Thanh Hóa
- Thanh Hoa FC, an association football club based in Thanh Hóa province
- Thanh Hóa FC (1962), an association football club based in Thanh Hóa province from 1962 to 2010
