= 1343 =

1343 in various calendars
- Gregorian calendar: 1343; MCCCXLIII
- Ab urbe condita: 2096
- Armenian calendar: 792; ԹՎ ՉՂԲ
- Assyrian calendar: 6093
- Balinese saka calendar: 1264–1265
- Bengali calendar: 749–750
- Berber calendar: 2293
- English Regnal year: 16 Edw. 3 – 17 Edw. 3
- Buddhist calendar: 1887
- Burmese calendar: 705
- Byzantine calendar: 6851–6852
- Chinese calendar: 壬午年 (Water Horse); 4040 or 3833 — to — 癸未年 (Water Goat); 4041 or 3834
- Coptic calendar: 1059–1060
- Discordian calendar: 2509
- Ethiopian calendar: 1335–1336
- Hebrew calendar: 5103–5104
- Hindu calendars
- Vikram Samvat: 1399–1400
- Shaka Samvat: 1264–1265
- Kali Yuga: 4443–4444
- Holocene calendar: 11343
- Igbo calendar: 343–344
- Iranian calendar: 721–722
- Islamic calendar: 743–744
- Japanese calendar: Kōei 2 (康永２年)
- Javanese calendar: 1255–1256
- Julian calendar: 1343; MCCCXLIII
- Korean calendar: 3676
- Minguo calendar: 569 before ROC 民前569年
- Nanakshahi calendar: −125
- Thai solar calendar: 1885–1886
- Tibetan calendar: ཆུ་ཕོ་རྟ་ལོ་ (male Water-Horse); 1469 or 1088 or 316 — to — ཆུ་མོ་ལུག་ལོ་ (female Water-Sheep); 1470 or 1089 or 317

Year 1343 (MCCCXLIII) was a common year starting on Wednesday of the Julian calendar.

== Events ==
=== January–December ===
- January 14 – Arnošt of Pardubice becomes the last bishop of Prague and, subsequently, the first Archbishop of Prague.
- January 20 – Joanna became the queen of Naples upon the death of her grandfather.
- January 27 – Pope Clement VI issues his bull Unigenitus, defining the doctrine of "The Treasury of Merits" or "The Treasury of the Church" as the basis for the issuance of indulgences by the Catholic Church.
- April 23 – The St. George's Night Uprising begins in Estonia.
- May 4 – St. George's Night Uprising: The "Four Estonian kings" are murdered, at the negotiations with the Livonian Order.
- May 12 – Edward the Black Prince became The Prince of Wales.
- August 15 – Magnus IV of Sweden abdicates from the throne of Norway, in favor of his son Haakon VI of Norway. However, Haakon is still a minor, allowing Magnus to remain de facto ruler.
- August 31 – A naval league is formed between the Pope, the Republic of Venice, the Knights Hospitaller and the Kingdom of Cyprus, to prepare the Smyrniote Crusades.
- November 25 – A tsunami, caused by an earthquake, devastates the Maritime Republic of Amalfi, among other places.

=== Date unknown ===
- Tsar Dušan conquers Albania.

== Births ==
- December 19 – William I, Margrave of Meissen (d. 1407)
- date unknown
  - Emperor Chōkei of Japan (d. 1394)
  - Constance of Aragon, queen consort of Sicily (d. 1363)
  - Thomas Percy, 1st Earl of Worcester, English rebel (d. 1403)
  - Nang Keo Phimpha, queen of Lan Xang (d. 1438)
  - Tommaso Mocenigo, doge of Venice (d. 1423)
  - Paolo Alboino della Scala, lord of Verona (d. 1375)
  - Alexander Stewart, Earl of Buchan, Scottish ruler (d. 1405)
- probable
  - Geoffrey Chaucer, English poet (approximate date) (d. 1400)

== Deaths ==
- January 20 – Robert of Naples (b. 1276)
- May 29 – Francesco I Manfredi, lord of Faenza
- June 22 – Aimone, Count of Savoy (b. 1291)
- June 23 – Giacomo Gaetani Stefaneschi, Italian cardinal (b. c. 1270)
- September 16 – Philip III of Navarre (b. 1306)
- December 15 – Hasan Kucek, Chobanid prince (b. c. 1319)
- date unknown
  - Sir Ulick Burke, Irish nobleman
  - Anne of Austria, Duchess of Bavaria (b. 1318)
  - Veera Ballala III, ruler of the Hoysala Empire (b. 1291)
