= Robert Wingfield =

Robert Wingfield may refer to:

- Sir Robert Wingfield (politician, died 1454), English landowner, administrator and MP for Suffolk, and for Hertfordshire
- Sir Robert Wingfield (diplomat) (1464–1539), MP for Great Grimsby
- Robert Wingfield (politician, died 1596), MP for Suffolk
- Robert Wingfield (historian) (c. 1513–c. 1561), English historian
