= 1456 =

1456 in various calendars
- Gregorian calendar: 1456; MCDLVI
- Ab urbe condita: 2209
- Armenian calendar: 905; ԹՎ ՋԵ
- Assyrian calendar: 6206
- Balinese saka calendar: 1377–1378
- Bengali calendar: 862–863
- Berber calendar: 2406
- English Regnal year: 34 Hen. 6 – 35 Hen. 6
- Buddhist calendar: 2000
- Burmese calendar: 818
- Byzantine calendar: 6964–6965
- Chinese calendar: 乙亥年 (Wood Pig); 4153 or 3946 — to — 丙子年 (Fire Rat); 4154 or 3947
- Coptic calendar: 1172–1173
- Discordian calendar: 2622
- Ethiopian calendar: 1448–1449
- Hebrew calendar: 5216–5217
- Hindu calendars
- Vikram Samvat: 1512–1513
- Shaka Samvat: 1377–1378
- Kali Yuga: 4556–4557
- Holocene calendar: 11456
- Igbo calendar: 456–457
- Iranian calendar: 834–835
- Islamic calendar: 860–861
- Japanese calendar: Kōshō 2 (康正２年)
- Javanese calendar: 1371–1372
- Julian calendar: 1456; MCDLVI
- Korean calendar: 3789
- Minguo calendar: 456 before ROC 民前456年
- Nanakshahi calendar: −12
- Thai solar calendar: 1998–1999
- Tibetan calendar: ཤིང་མོ་ཕག་ལོ་ (female Wood-Boar); 1582 or 1201 or 429 — to — མེ་ཕོ་བྱི་བ་ལོ་ (male Fire-Rat); 1583 or 1202 or 430

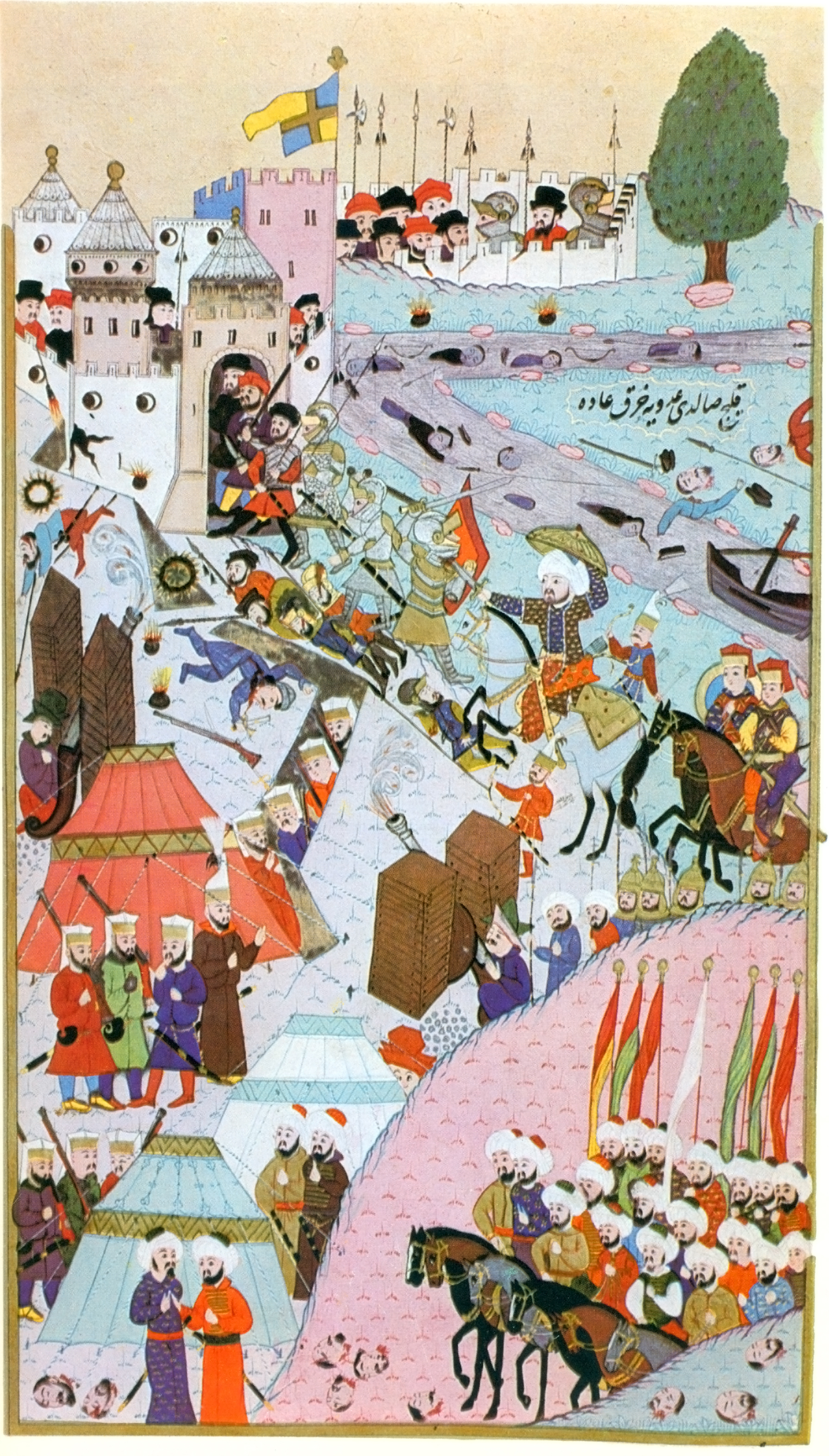
July 22: Christian soldiers in the Siege of Belgrade rout the Ottoman Muslim army

Year 1456 (MCDLVI) was a leap year starting on Thursday of the Julian calendar.

== Events ==
=== January–March ===
- January 6 – After two years as Ecumenical Patriarch of Constantinople, the Eastern Orthodox Christian partriarch in the Islamic Ottoman Empire, Gennadius Scholarius resigns, and Isidore II is elected to replace him.
- January 24 – After Dorino II Gattilusio seizes ownership of the Greek mainland harbor of Ainos and the islands of Samothrace and Imbros, Ottoman Sultan Mehmed II orders a blockade the port with 10 ships and leads a ground invasion. After the surrender off Ainos, Mehmed II sends his Admiral Mirza Yunus Beg commences the take control of Samothrace and Imbros.
- February 25 –
  - The Treaty of Yazhelbitsy is signed between the Grand Principality of Moscow (led by Grand Prince Vasily II) and the Novgorod Republic (governed by Vasily Shuisky) with Vasily II becoming the Prince of Novgorod.
  - As King Henry VI of England recovers from a three-month bout with mental illness, Richard Plantagenet, Duke of York steps down as Protector of the Realm and the King resumes his duties. The Duke of York had served as regent since November 19, and had previously been Lord Protector for 10 months during 1454 and 1455.
- March 12 – After a session of eight months that had started on July 9, 1455, the English Parliament adjourns at Westminster. Royal assent is given by King Henry VI to bills passed, including the Importation Act 1455, banning the import for the next five years of woven silk goods (including ribbons and girdles) that had been manufactured outside of England, and subjecting importers to heavy fines. and the Embezzlement Act, allowing civil remedies by executors of estates to recover goods that had been stolen by servants from their masters.
- March 13 – The papal bull Inter caetera is issued by Pope Callixtus III, recognizing the rights of the Kingdom of Portugal to colonize any territories its explorers discover on the West African coast, and making the non-Christian natives of those colonies perpetual vassals of the King of Portugal.

=== April–June ===
- April 5 – Skanderbeg, leader of the Albanians in their fight against the Ottomans, pardons Moisi Galemi, a former officer who had defected to the Ottomans and was then defeated by Skanderbeg at the Battle of Oranik.
- May 18 – Second Battle of Oronichea (1456): Ottoman Forces of 15,000 are sent to capture Albania, but are met and swiftly defeated by Skanderbeg's smaller forces.
- June 9 – Halley's Comet makes an appearance, as noted by the humanist scholar Platina.

=== July–September ===
- July 7 – A retrial of Joan of Arc acquits her of heresy, 25 years after her execution.
- July 22 – At the Battle of Nándorfehérvár, the Hungarians under John Hunyadi rout the Turkish army of Sultan Mehmed II. The noon bell ordered by Pope Callixtus III commemorates the victory throughout the Christian world (and hence is still rung). Hunyadi dies two months later when a plague sweeps the Hungarian camp.
- July 29 – A treaty is signed at Toruń between the Kingdom of Poland and mercenaries led by Oldrzych Czerwonka with Poland purchasing the 21 fortresses of Czerwonka's people in exchange for 463,794 florins (1.62 million grams or 58,000 ounces of gold).
- August 20 – Vladislav II, reigning Prince of Wallachia, is killed in hand-to-hand combat by the former Prince, Vlad the Impaler, who succeeds him.
- September 15 – The Burgundian state, led by Prince Philip the Good, captures the rebel city of Deventer in the Netherlands after a 32-day siege that had been defended by Gijsbrecht van Brederode, Bishop of Utrecht.
- September 23 – Pope Calixtus III issues a papal bull granting a seven-year indulgence to any Christian who makes a pilgrimage to Our Lady of the Pillar in Zaragoza in Spain's Kingdom of Aragon

=== October–December ===
- October 17 – The University of Greifswald is established, making it the second oldest university in Northern Europe. Due to border changes, from 1648 to 1815 it is the oldest in Sweden, and from 1815 to 1945 the oldest in Prussia.
- November 9 – Ulrich II, Count of Celje, regent for King Ladislas of Hungary and governor of Slavonia, Croatia and Dalmatia, is assassinated the day after he had entered the fortress of Belgrade, apparently at the direction of Ladislaus Hunyadi, son of the late John Hunyadi.
- December 5 – A 7.4 magnitude earthquake (estimated subsequently by geologists), the first of two on the Italian peninsula, strikes near Pontelandolfo (at the time, part of the Papal States) at 11:00 at night and kills as many as 70,000 people.
- December 30 – A second earthquake strikes the Italian peninsula in the Kingdom of Naples at 9:30 p.m. and is estimated by geologists at 7.0 magnitude, followed by a 6.0 aftershock, and kills an indeterminate number of people.

=== Date unknown ===
- Lazar Branković becomes despot of Serbia.
- Alvise Cadamosto discovers some of the Cape Verde Islands.
- Diogo Gomes reaches the Geba River in Guinea Bissau, and explores the Gambia River.
- Emperor Zara Yaqob of Ethiopia founds the city of Debre Berhan.
- Muscovy and the Novgorod Republic conclude the Treaty of Yazhelbitsy.
- Petru Aron becomes the first ruler of Moldavia to pay tribute to the Ottomans.
- The fifth Mersenne prime, 8191, is discovered.

== Births ==
- March – Jan Łaski, Polish nobleman (d. 1531)
- March 1 – Vladislaus II, king of Bohemia, Hungary and Croatia (d. 1516)
- June 11 – Anne Neville, queen consort of Richard III of England (d. 1485)
- June 23 – Margaret of Denmark, Queen of Scotland, consort of James III of Scotland (d. 1486)
- June 25 – Henry V of Rosenberg, Bohemian nobleman (d. 1489)
- July 28 - Jacopo Sannazaro, Italian poet (d. 1530)
- October 16 – Ludmila of Poděbrady, Regent of the duchies of Brzeg and Oława from 1488 (d. 1503)
- November 7 – Margaret of Bavaria, Electress Palatine and hereditary princess of Bavaria-Landshut (d. 1501)
- November 8 – Queen Gonghye, Korean royal consort (d. 1474)
- date unknown
  - Jeanne Hachette (Laisné), French peasant heroine
  - Antonia di Paolo di Dono, Italian artist and daughter of Paolo di Dono (d. 1491)
  - Jan Lubrański, Polish bishop (d. 1520)

== Deaths ==
- January 17 – Elisabeth of Lorraine-Vaudémont, French translator (b. 1395)
- June 27 - Alfonso V of Aragon, King of Aragon (b. 1396)
- August 11 – John Hunyadi, Hungarian statesman and military leader (b. c. 1406)
- August 20 – Vladislav II of Wallachia
- October 17 – Nicolas Grenon, French composer (b. 1375)
- October 23 – Giovanni da Capistrano, Italian saint (b. 1386)
- November 3 – Edmund Tudor, 1st Earl of Richmond, father of King Henry VII of England (b. 1431)
- November 9 – Ulrich II, Count of Celje (b. 1406)
- November 25 – Jacques Cœur, French merchant (b. 1395)
- December 4 – Charles I, Duke of Bourbon (b. 1401)
- December 24 – Đurađ Branković, Despot of Serbia (b. 1377)
- date unknown – Juan de Mena, Spanish poet (b. 1411)
