= 1332 =

1332 in various calendars
- Gregorian calendar: 1332; MCCCXXXII
- Ab urbe condita: 2085
- Armenian calendar: 781; ԹՎ ՉՁԱ
- Assyrian calendar: 6082
- Balinese saka calendar: 1253–1254
- Bengali calendar: 738–739
- Berber calendar: 2282
- English Regnal year: 5 Edw. 3 – 6 Edw. 3
- Buddhist calendar: 1876
- Burmese calendar: 694
- Byzantine calendar: 6840–6841
- Chinese calendar: 辛未年 (Metal Goat); 4029 or 3822 — to — 壬申年 (Water Monkey); 4030 or 3823
- Coptic calendar: 1048–1049
- Discordian calendar: 2498
- Ethiopian calendar: 1324–1325
- Hebrew calendar: 5092–5093
- Hindu calendars
- Vikram Samvat: 1388–1389
- Shaka Samvat: 1253–1254
- Kali Yuga: 4432–4433
- Holocene calendar: 11332
- Igbo calendar: 332–333
- Iranian calendar: 710–711
- Islamic calendar: 732–733
- Japanese calendar: Shōkei 1 (正慶元年)
- Javanese calendar: 1244–1245
- Julian calendar: 1332; MCCCXXXII
- Korean calendar: 3665
- Minguo calendar: 580 before ROC 民前580年
- Nanakshahi calendar: −136
- Thai solar calendar: 1874–1875
- Tibetan calendar: ལྕགས་མོ་ལུག་ལོ་ (female Iron-Sheep); 1458 or 1077 or 305 — to — ཆུ་ཕོ་སྤྲེ་ལོ་ (male Water-Monkey); 1459 or 1078 or 306

Year 1332 (MCCCXXXII) was a leap year starting on Wednesday of the Julian calendar.

== Events ==
- February 18 – Amda Seyon I, Emperor of Ethiopia, begins his campaigns in the southern Muslim provinces (possibly in 1329).
- July 28 – Bonne of Luxemburg married John Duke of Normandy.
- August 10–11 – Battle of Dupplin Moor: Edward Balliol rebels, and the English defeat the loyalists of David II in Scotland.
- September – Edward Balliol crowns himself King of Scotland.
- November 7 – Lucerne joins the Swiss Confederation with Uri, Schwyz, and Unterwalden.
- December 16 – Battle of Annan: The loyalists of David II defeat Edward Balliol in Scotland.
- The city of Marosvásárhely (in Transylvania, today Târgu Mureș in Romania) is first documented in the papal registry, under the name Novum Forum Siculorum.

== Births ==
- May 27 – Ibn Khaldun, North African Arab historian (d. 1406)
- June 8 – Cangrande II della Scala, Lord of Verona (d. 1359)
- June 16 – Isabella de Coucy, English princess, daughter of King Edward III of England (d. 1379 or 1382)
- June 18 – John V Palaiologos, Byzantine Emperor (d. 1391)
- October 10 – King Charles II of Navarre (d. 1387)
- date unknown
  - Pero López de Ayala, Spanish soldier (d. 1407)
  - Elizabeth de Burgh, 4th Countess of Ulster (d. 1363)
  - Andrea Vanni, Italian painter (d. c. 1414)
  - Hanna van Recklinghausen, Dutch banker
  - Xu Da, Chinese military leader (d. 1385)
- Approximate
  - William Langland, English poet (d. c.1400)
  - Catherine of Vadstena, Swedish saint (d. 1381)

== Deaths ==
- January 8 – Andronikos III Megas Komnenos, Emperor of Trebizond
- February – Henry Hussey, 1st Baron Hussey (b. c. 1265)
- February 13 – Andronikos II Palaiologos, Byzantine Emperor (b. 1259)
- March 13 – Theodore Metochites, Byzantine Empire statesman, author, man of learning, and patron of the arts (b. 1270)
- June 16 – Adam de Brome, founder of Oriel College, Oxford
- July 20 – Thomas Randolph, 1st Earl of Moray, regent of Scotland
- August 2 – King Christopher II of Denmark (b. 1276)
- August 11 – at the Battle of Dupplin Moor
  - Domhnall II, Earl of Mar
  - Robert II Keith, Marischal of Scotland
  - Thomas Randolph, 2nd Earl of Moray
  - Muireadhach III, Earl of Menteith
  - Robert Bruce, Lord of Liddesdale
- September 4 – García de Ayerbe, Spanish bishop and crusade theorist
- date unknown
  - Jayaatu Khan Tugh Temür, Emperor Wenzong of the Yuan dynasty (b. 1304)
  - Rinchinbal Khan, Emperor Ningzong of the Yuan dynasty (b. 1326)
- approximate date – Mary of Woodstock, English princess (b. 1279)
