= 1407 =

1407 in various calendars
- Gregorian calendar: 1407; MCDVII
- Ab urbe condita: 2160
- Armenian calendar: 856; ԹՎ ՊԾԶ
- Assyrian calendar: 6157
- Balinese saka calendar: 1328–1329
- Bengali calendar: 813–814
- Berber calendar: 2357
- English Regnal year: 8 Hen. 4 – 9 Hen. 4
- Buddhist calendar: 1951
- Burmese calendar: 769
- Byzantine calendar: 6915–6916
- Chinese calendar: 丙戌年 (Fire Dog); 4104 or 3897 — to — 丁亥年 (Fire Pig); 4105 or 3898
- Coptic calendar: 1123–1124
- Discordian calendar: 2573
- Ethiopian calendar: 1399–1400
- Hebrew calendar: 5167–5168
- Hindu calendars
- Vikram Samvat: 1463–1464
- Shaka Samvat: 1328–1329
- Kali Yuga: 4507–4508
- Holocene calendar: 11407
- Igbo calendar: 407–408
- Iranian calendar: 785–786
- Islamic calendar: 809–810
- Japanese calendar: Ōei 14 (応永１４年)
- Javanese calendar: 1321–1322
- Julian calendar: 1407; MCDVII
- Korean calendar: 3740
- Minguo calendar: 505 before ROC 民前505年
- Nanakshahi calendar: −61
- Thai solar calendar: 1949–1950
- Tibetan calendar: མེ་ཕོ་ཁྱི་ལོ་ (male Fire-Dog); 1533 or 1152 or 380 — to — མེ་མོ་ཕག་ལོ་ (female Fire-Boar); 1534 or 1153 or 381

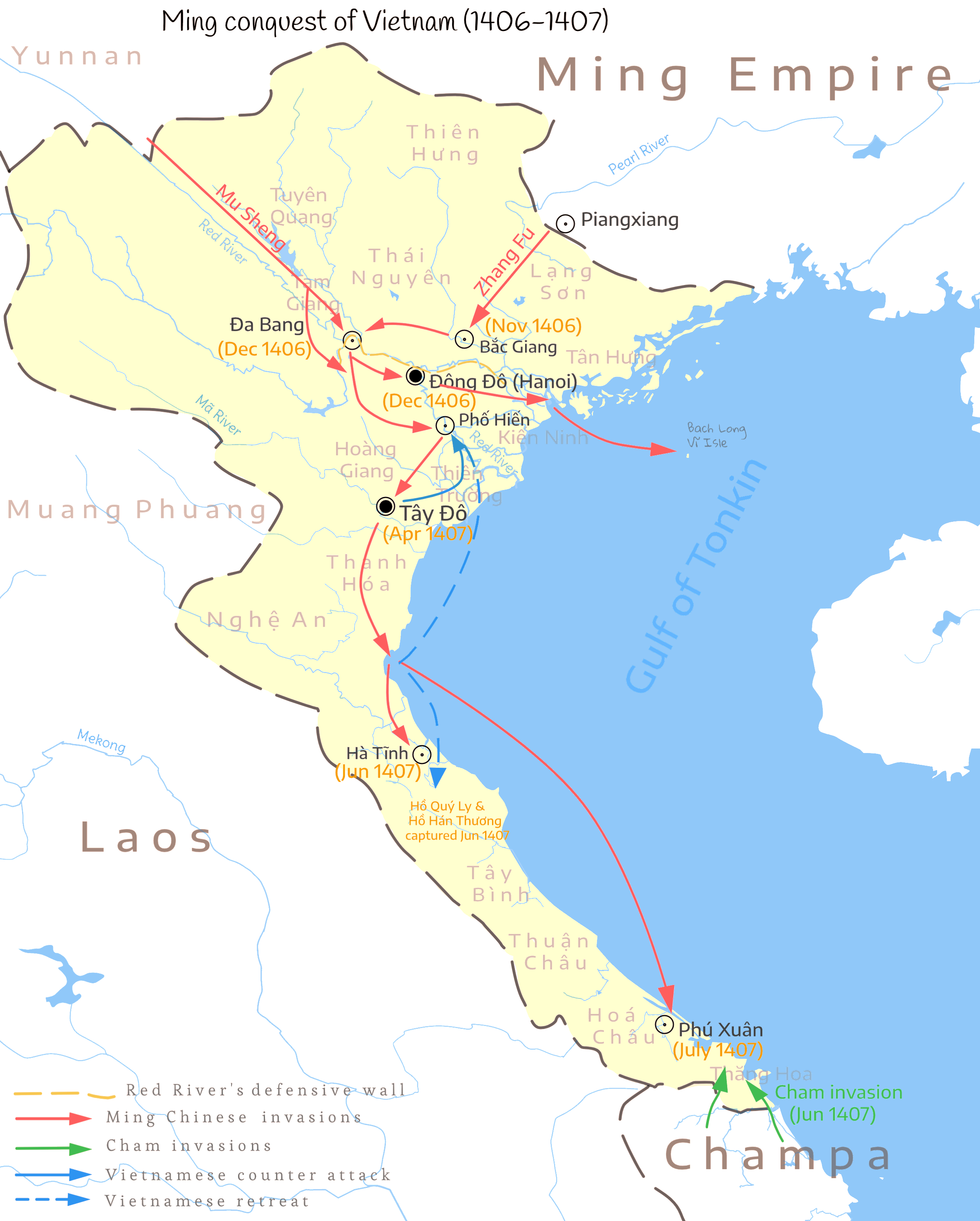
May 16: The Chinese Empire completes its conquest of Vietnam.

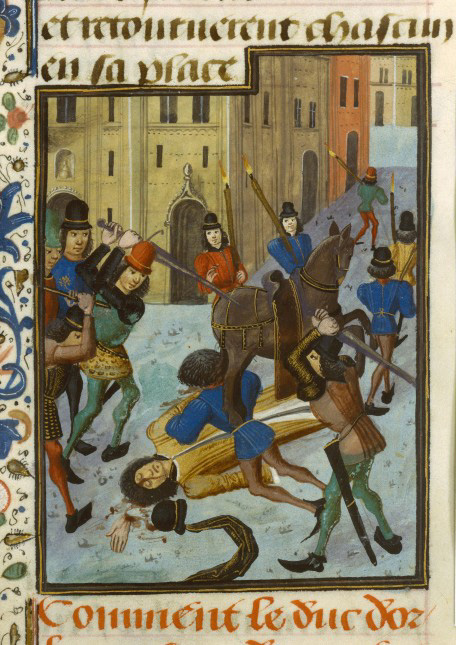
November 23: Louis, Duke of Orleans, regent for his brother, King Charles VI of France, is assassinated.

Year 1407 (MCDVII) was a common year starting on Saturday of the Julian calendar.

== Events ==
=== January–March ===
- January 20 – Ming–Việt War: China conquers Dong Do, the eastern capital of Dai Ngu (now Hanoi, capital of Vietnam, and follows six days later by conquering the western capital, Tay Do (now Thanh Hóa) on January 26.
- February 21 – Ming–Việt War: Hồ Nguyên Trừng, commander of the Vietnamese armada of 500 ships, launches a counterattack on invading Chinese ships on the Thai Binh River, but the Chinese forces use cannons to destroy the Viet fleet, killing as many as 10,000 of the defending forces.
- February 22 – Pir Muhammad Mirza, co-ruler of the Timurid Empire (Transoxiana) that encompasses what is now Iran and most of the Near East of Asia, is murdered by his vizier, Pir Ali Taz. He is succeeded by his cousin, Khalil Sultan, who becomes the sole ruler of Transoxiana until being overthrown in 1409.

=== April–June ===
- March 1 – Persian astronomer and mathematician Jamshid al-Kashi completes his treatise Sullam al-sama' ("The Ladder of the Sky")
- March 7 – At 12 years old, Gianfrancesco I Gonzaga becomes the new Marquis of Mantua, and area encompassing much of the Lombardy region of Italy, upon the death of his father, Francesco I Gonzaga.
- March 18 – Ming–Việt War: In Vietnam's Phung Hoa prefecture, the invading Chinese troops use a larger weapon, the da jiangjun chong cannon, to destroy more of the Viet ships.
- April 10 – After several invitations by the Emperor Cheng Zu of China, the lama Deshin Shekpa, the fifth Karmapa of the Karma Kagyu sect of Tibetan Buddhism, finally visits the Emperor at Nanjing, the Ming dynasty. In his 22-day visit, the Karmapa thrills the Ming court with alleged miracles that are recorded in a gigantic scroll, translated into five different languages. In a show of mystical prowess, Deshin Shekpa adds legitimacy to a questionable succession to the throne by Cheng Zu, who had killed his nephew the Jianwen Emperor in the culmination of a civil war. For his services to the Ming court, including his handling of the ceremonial rites of Cheng Zu's deceased parents, Deshin Shekpa is awarded the title Great Treasure Prince of Dharma (大寶法王).
- April 23 – The Banco di San Giorgio is founded by the government of the Republic of Genoa in Italy.
- May 4 – Ming–Việt War: A Vietnamese force of 70,000 troops attempts to stop the advance of the Chinese at the Hong River at the Ham Tu pass in what is now Vietnam's Hưng Yên province. With superior firepower, the Chinese kill over 10,000 Viet troops and capture hundreds of warships.
- May 8 – The Earl of Somerset resigns as Admiral of the North and West of the English Navy. The office will remain vacant until assumed by Thomas Beaufort, Duke of Exeter on September 21, 1408.*
- May 30 – Ming–Việt War: In a last ditch effort to stop the Chinese invasion, the Vietnamese forces fight a final battle at Thanh Hóa, where the Emperor Hon Han Thuong had moved his capital. The Viet force loses 10,000 additional soldiers and the Vietnamese royal family flees during the retreat.
- June 16 – Ming–Hồ War: Ho Han Thuong, Emperor of Vietnam (Dai Ngu) is captured by the Imperial Chinese Army along with his father, the former Emperor Hồ Quý Ly, completing the conquest of Vietnam by the Chinese Empire.

=== July–December ===
- October 5 – A group of high officials of the former Vietnamese government are put on trial before China's Emperor Cheng Zu at Nanjing, and charged with treason for killing the previous Vietnamese ruler. Most of the prisoners are executed.
- October 20 – The English Parliament is opened at Gloucester after being summoned on August 26 by King Henry IV, and is marked by arguments between the House of Lords and the House of Commons over primacy and initiation of money bills.
- November 20 – A solemn truce is agreed upon between John the Fearless, Duke of Burgundy and Louis I, Duke of Orléans under the auspices of John, Duke of Berry.
- November 23 – The Duke of Orleans is assassinated, and war breaks out again between the Burgundians and the Duke's followers.
- December 2 –
  - China's Emperor Cheng Zu sends an order to Marquis Zhang Fu, who had recently conquered Vietnam and executed many of its officials, to avoid harming any innocent Vietnamese civilians.
  - The English Parliament closes after having met for six weeks.
- December – The Yongle Encyclopedia, until the 21st century the largest encyclopedia of history, is completed in China after four years of work by 2,169 scholars at the Hanlin Academy and the Imperial University.

=== Date unknown ===
- Rudolfo Belenzani leads a revolt against Bishop Georg von Liechtenstein in Trento, Bishopric of Trent.
- David Holbache founds Oswestry School, in the Welsh Marches.
- Mateu Texidor finishes the Puente de la Trinidad bridge in Valencia, Spain.

== Births ==
- March 15 – Jacob, Margrave of Baden-Baden (1431-1453) (d. 1453)
- August 27 – Ashikaga Yoshikazu, Japanese shōgun (d. 1425)
- September 21 – Leonello d'Este, Marquis of Ferrara, Italian noble (d. 1450)
- November 8 – Alain de Coëtivy, Catholic cardinal (d. 1474)
- date unknown
  - Thomas de Littleton, English judge (d. 1481)
  - Marguerite, bâtarde de France, French noble, illegitimate daughter of the King of France (d. 1458)
  - Demetrios Palaiologos, Byzantine prince (d. 1470)
  - Lorenzo Valla, Italian humanist, philosopher, literary critic (d. 1457)

== Deaths ==
- February 9 – William I, Margrave of Meissen (b. 1343)
- February 16 – Abdallah Fakhr al-Din, religious leader
- March 7 – Francesco I Gonzaga, ruler of Mantua
- April 23 – Olivier V de Clisson, French soldier (b. 1336)
- July – Empress Xu (Ming dynasty), Chinese Empress (b. 1362)
- November 23 – Louis I, Duke of Orléans, brother of Charles VI of France (murdered) (b. 1372)
- date unknown
  - Pero López de Ayala, Spanish soldier (b. 1332)
  - Kolgrim, Norse Greenlander and alleged sorcerer
