= Chen Yanxiang =

14/15th-century Chinese merchant

- 陳彥祥
- Occupation: Merchant
- Years active: 1394–1412
- Employer: Majapahit in Java (presumed)
- Known for: Only person from Indonesia to have visited Joseon

Chinese name
- Chinese: 陳彥祥
Transcriptions
Standard Mandarin
- Hanyu Pinyin: Chén Yànxiáng
- Bopomofo: ㄔㄣˊ ㄧㄢˋㄒㄧㄤˊ
- Gwoyeu Romatzyh: Chern Yannshyang
- Wade–Giles: Chʻên^{2} Yen^{4}-hsiang^{2}
Yue: Cantonese
- Yale Romanization: Chàhn Yihn-chèuhng
- Jyutping: Can^{4} Jin^{6}-coeng^{4}
Southern Min
- Hokkien POJ: Tân Gān-siông

Korean name
- Hangul: 진언상
- Hanja: 陳彥祥
Transcriptions
- Revised Romanization: Jin Eonsang
- McCune–Reischauer: Chin Ŏnsang

Chen Yanxiang (Chinese: 陳彥祥; pinyin: Chén Yànxiáng; fl. 1394–1412) was a merchant of Chinese origin, probably based on the Indonesian island of Java, who visited Joseon Korea and Muromachi Japan between 1394 and 1412. The only source for his life is the Korean Joseon Veritable Records, from which a "particularly colorful career" can be seen.

Chen first appears in a Veritable Records entry for 1394, when he was appointed to the Korean Bureau of Astronomy along with a Chinese merchant from the Thai kingdom of Ayutthaya. At some point, he left Korea. He returned to Korea in 1406 with a cargo of exotic birds, pepper, and other Southeast Asian goods, claiming—without any credentials—to be an ambassador from a Javanese king. Off the Korean coastline, Chen was attacked by Japanese pirates, possibly hired by the daimyo of Tsushima Island, and lost his entire cargo. He eventually went back to Java after being hosted by the Korean king Taejong and the "King of Japan", presumably the shogun Ashikaga Yoshimochi. Chen returned to Japan in 1411, this time with an official title of high rank granted by the Javanese court. He visited Kyoto, then Japan's capital, while sending his grandson to offer gifts to the Korean court. In 1412, his grandson asked the Korean government for a naval escort back to Java. The Korean government declined. Chen is not mentioned thereafter. He was the only known person from Indonesia to have ever visited dynastic Korea.

== Background ==
Chen Yanxiang was of Chinese descent. He was probably a Chinese merchant based on the Indonesian island of Java, on whose northern coastline large numbers of South Chinese people had settled by the beginning of the fifteenth century. Javanese contact with the Chinese particularly intensified with the influx of Chinese merchants who decided to stay in the island following Ming China's prohibitions on private maritime trade, and with the early Ming emperors' great interest in the tribute trade, which included the famed treasure voyages that reached Java on several occasions. Javanese states often hired personnel of Chinese origin as envoys for the tribute trade, although these individuals were sufficiently assimilated into Javanese court protocol to receive high-ranking noble titles such as arya and patih.

In the late fourteenth and early fifteenth centuries, Java was divided between multiple polities, of which the most prominent was Majapahit. The campaigns of Hayam Wuruk and Gajah Mada ensured that the majority of the island had fallen under Majapahit hegemony by the late fourteenth century, but by the next century, its control over the northern coastline was beginning to ebb. The Joseon Veritable Records, a Korean history which is the only source yet known for Chen's life, refers only to "Java" (Korean: 爪哇 Jowa) without naming a specific polity. The polity that patronized the merchant is generally taken to be Majapahit, the independent Javanese state most active in maritime trade during the period.

== Career ==
Chen first appears in a Joseon Veritable Records entry for 2 September 1394, which states that he was appointed to a post in the Korean Bureau of Astronomy together with Zhang Sidao, a Chinese merchant from Ayutthaya. A later entry states as an aside that Chen had come to Korea as an ambassador to present gifts. Because Zhang was present in Korea in 1394 as a supposed ambassador of the king of Ayutthaya, (Note: Probably a private trading mission that feigned official status to receive greater favor from the Korean government) some historians have suggested that Chen was part of the supposed embassy. However, there is no clear evidence that this is the case, and Chen is not mentioned in the Veritable Records entry for Zhang's first arrival in Korea, in 1393. As Zhang had gone to Japan before returning to Korea in 1394, Korean historian Cho Hung-guk speculates that Chen may have been in Japan in 1394 when he encountered Zhang and decided to follow him to Korea.

Chen reappears in the Veritable Record entries for 1406, after apparently having left Korea at an unspecified date. On 4 June 1406, he set off from Java for Korea on a 33-meter-long jong ship of an estimated 220 deadweight tons, with a crew of 121 people. Chen claimed to be an ambassador of a Javanese king, although this claim is unverifiable, as he had no royal titles or documents. The ship was loaded with various Southeast Asian products, including parrots, peacocks, agarwood, camphor, and black pepper. On 14 August, Chen's ship encountered fifteen ships of Japanese pirates off Gunsan. After two days of fighting, the ship and the majority of the crew were lost, and all of Chen's goods were stolen by the pirates. Only about forty survivors managed to reach Korean shores. They were brought to the Korean capital of Hanyang on 12 October, where they were hosted by King Taejong.

On 27 October, Chen left Korea after receiving a written document from the Korean State Council confirming that Chen had indeed lost his goods to pirates, as he feared that the Javanese would not believe him. He also donated his ship to the Koreans in return for a smaller Korean ship befitting the reduced number of sailors, and promised to return the next year. After departing from Korea, Chen sailed into the Seto Inland Sea of Japan, where he was shipwrecked by a storm. He and the crew were then robbed of everything, including their clothes, by Japanese pirates. The "King of Japan", presumably the shogun Ashikaga Yoshimochi, rescued Chen and what remained of his crew and sent them back to Java together with a Japanese envoy at an unspecified date.

On 6 November, ten days after Chen's departure, Sō Sadashige—the Japanese daimyo who ruled Tsushima Island—offered the Korean king gifts of pepper, fragrant wood, and peacocks, saying that they were from a southern ship that his troops had captured. Cho Hung-guk speculates that this was from the cargo of Chen Yanxiang.

Chen's successful return voyage may have alerted the Javanese to the benefits of commercial and political ties to Korea and Japan, and at some point, the Javanese king sent Chen as an ambassador to Japan. This appears to have been an official embassy, as Chen now claimed the aristocratic title arya given to the highest-ranking ambassadors in Majapahit court protocol. Chen reached the Japanese port of Hakata in the seventh lunisolar month (21 July – 20 August) of 1411 and was allowed to visit the Japanese capital of Kyoto in early 1412. At the same time, he sent his grandson, Chen Shichong (Chinese: 陳實崇; pinyin: Chén Shíchóng), to Korea with Southeast Asian goods to thank the Korean government for its prior hospitality.

Chen Shichong arrived in Korea in the fourth lunisolar month (11 May – 10 June) of 1412 and left on 3 July. Chen Shichong asked the Korean government for a naval escort back to Java, noting the dangers of Japanese pirates on the seas, who had repeatedly robbed his grandfather and might "murder us on the way [back] and conceal the traces [of the murder]." The Korean government declined, reflecting its tepid attitude towards maritime ventures and foreign commerce.

The Korean government's refusal of an escort is the last mention of Chen Yanxiang or his family in the surviving sources.
