= Pietro Correr =

Pietro Correr may refer to:

- Pietro Correr (patriarch)
- Pietro Correr (politician)

== See also ==
- Correr
