= Varotari =

Varotari is a surname. Notable people with the surname include:

- Dario Varotari the Elder (c. 1539–1596), Italian painter, sculptor and architect
- Dario Varotari the Younger (active 1660), Italian painter, engraver and poet
- Chiara Varotari (1584–1663), Italian Baroque painter
