= Cardinals created by Innocent VII =

Catholic appointments in 1405

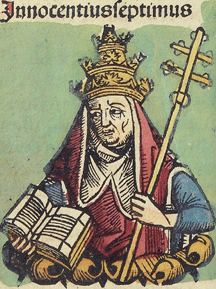
Pope Innocent VII (r. 1404–1406)

Pope Innocent VII (r. 1404–1406), the third Pope in the obedience of Rome during the Great Western Schism, created eleven new cardinals in one consistory celebrated on 12 June 1405:

== 12 June 1405 ==
1. Corrado Caraccioli, archbishop of Mileto and camerlengo of the Holy Roman Church − cardinal-priest of S. Crisogono, † 15 February 1411
2. Angelo Correr, Latin Patriarch of Constantinople, administrator of the see of Coron and governor of the March of Ancona − cardinal-priest of S. Marco (received the title on 20 October 1406), then Pope Gregory XII in the obedience of Rome (30 November 1406 until his abdication on 4 July 1415); became cardinal-bishop of Frascati (Tusculum) after his abdication (15 July 1415), † 18 October 1417
3. Francesco Uguccione, archbishop of Bordeaux − cardinal-priest of SS. IV Coronati, † 14 July 1412
4. Giordano Orsini, archbishop of Naples − cardinal-priest of SS. Silvestro e Martino, then cardinal-bishop of Albano (23 September 1412), cardinal-bishop of Sabiny (14 March 1431), † 29 May 1438
5. Giovanni Migliorati (nephew of the Pope), archbishop of Ravenna − cardinal-priest of S. Croce in Gerusalemme (received the title on 20 October 1406), † 16 October 1410
6. Pietro Filargo, OFM, archbishop of Milan − cardinal-priest of SS. XII Apostoli, then Antipope Alexander V in the obedience of Pisa (26 June 1409), † 3 May 1410
7. Antonio Arcioni, bishop of Ascoli Piceno − cardinal-priest of S. Pietro in Vincoli, † 21 July 1405
8. Antonio Calvi, bishop of Todi − cardinal-priest of S. Prassede, then cardinal-priest of S. Marco (2 July 1409), † 2 October 1411
9. Oddone Colonna, administrator of the suburbicarian see of Palestrina − cardinal-deacon of S. Giorgio in Velabro (received the title on 12 July 1405), became Pope Martin V on 11 November 1417, † 20 February 1431
10. Pietro Stefaneschi, protonotary apostolic − cardinal-deacon of S. Angelo in Pescheria, then cardinal-deacon of SS. Cosma e Damiano (2 June 1409) and again cardinal-deacon of S. Angelo in Pescheria (1410), † 30 October 1417
11. Jean Gilles, papal legate in the ecclesiastical provinces of Cologne, Reims and Trier − cardinal-deacon of SS. Cosma e Damiano (received the title on 12 January 1406), † 1 July 1408

== Sources ==
- Miranda, Salvador. "Consistories for the creation of Cardinals 15th Century (1394-1503): Innocent VII (1404-1406) (Rome obedience)". The Cardinals of the Holy Roman Church. Florida International University. OCLC 53276621.
- Konrad Eubel, Hierarchia Catholica, vol. I, Münster 1913
- Martin Souchon: Die Papstwahlen in der Zeit des grossen Schismas, Vol. 1-2, Verlag von Benno Goeritz, 1898-1899
