= Tarabotti =

Tarabotti is a surname. Notable people with the surname include:

- Arcangela Tarabotti
- Caterina Tarabotti
