= Diocese of Argos =

Diocese of Argos can refer to:

- Metropolis of Argolis, active Greek Orthodox see
- Latin Bishopric of Argos, Roman Catholic see instituted during the Crusades and Venetian rule
