= Archdiocese of Corinth =

Archdiocese of Corinth may refer to the following ecclesiastical jurisdictions :

- the former residential (crusader) and present titular Catholic Latin Archbishopric of Corinth
- the present Greek Orthodox Metropolis of Corinth, Sicyon, Zemenon, Tarsos and Polyphengos
