= Cardinals created by Gregory XII =

Catholic appointments in 1408

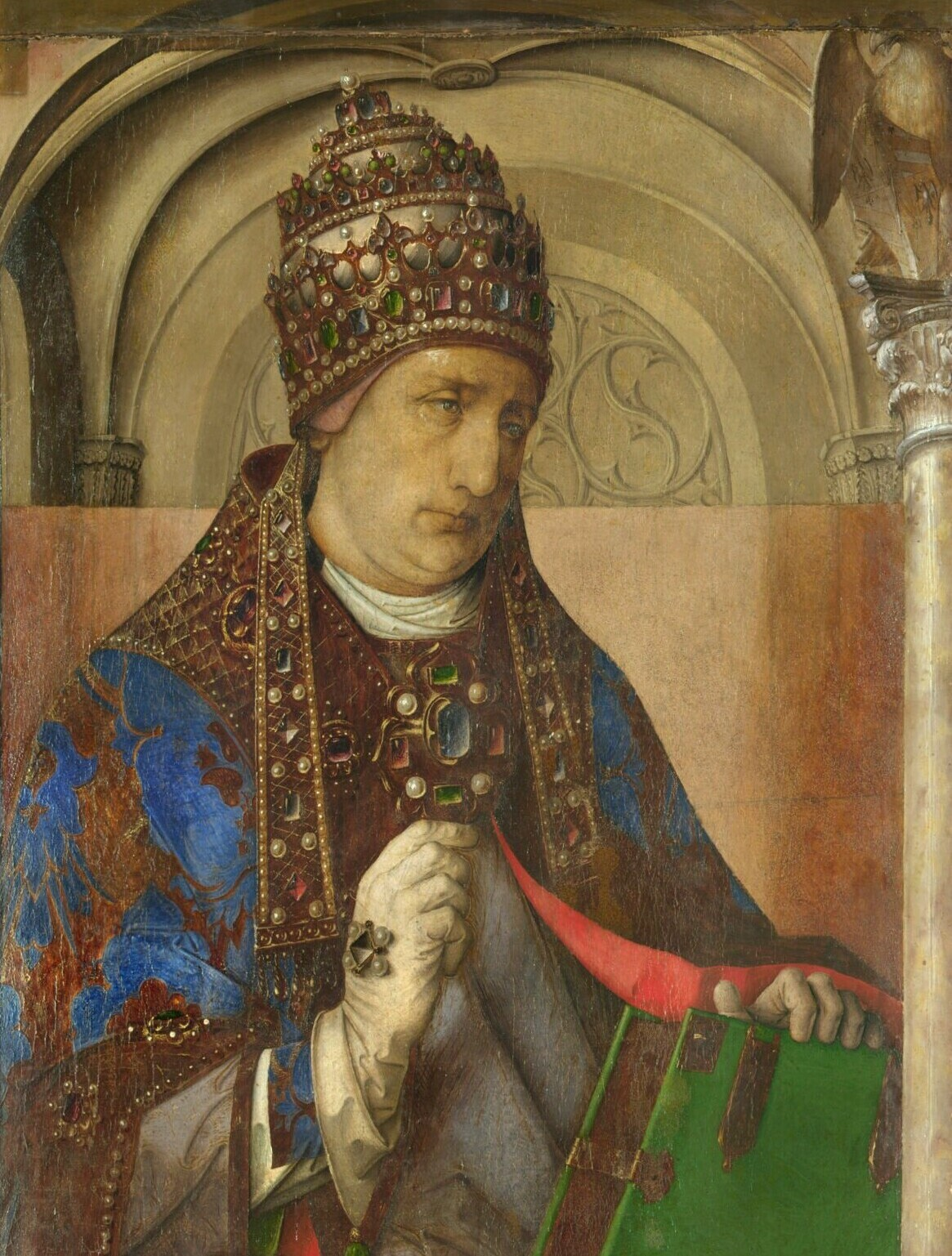
Pope Gregory XII (r. 1406–1415)

Pope Gregory XII (r. 1406–1415) created 14 cardinals in 2 consistories he held during his pontificate; this included his future successor Pope Eugene IV.

== 9 May 1408 ==
- Antonio Correr Can. Reg. O.S.A.
- Gabriele Condulmer Can. Reg. O.S.A.
- Giovanni Dominici O.P.
- Giacopo del Torso

== 19 September 1408 ==
- Ludovico Bonito
- Angelo Cino
- Angelo Barbarigo
- Bandello Bandelli
- Philip Repington Can. Reg. O.S.A.
- Matthäus von Krakau
- Luca Manzoli O.Hum.
- Vicente de Ribas O.S.B.
- Pietro Morosini iuniore
- Ottaviano Ottaviani

== Sources ==
- Miranda, Salvador. "Consistories for the creation of Cardinals 15th Century (1394-1503): Gregory XII (1406-1415) (Rome obedience)". The Cardinals of the Holy Roman Church. Florida International University. OCLC 53276621.
