= Pantaleone Giustinian =

Italian catholic patriarch

Pantaleone Giustinian (before 1229 – 1286) was a Venetian nobleman and cleric, who served as the Latin Patriarch of Constantinople from 1253 until his death.

Pantaleone Giustinian was the son of Philip Giustinian, lord of the Greek islands of Keos and Serifos after the Fourth Crusade. Born in the early 13th century, he is first mentioned in 1229. His appointment to the vacant Latin see of Constantinople was part of a papal effort to secure firm Venetian support for the decaying Latin Empire. For the same reason, to enhance Giustinian's authority, he was also appointed papal legate to the Latin Empire. However, in 1261, Constantinople fell to the restored Byzantine Empire. From then on until his death, Giustinian resided mostly in Venice.

== Sources ==
Catholic Church titles
Vacant Title last held by Niccolò Visconti da Castro Arquato	Latin Patriarch of Constantinople (from 1261 in exile); 1253–1286	Succeeded by Pietro Correr

Gaffuri, Laura (2001). "GIUSTINIAN, Pantaleone". Dizionario Biografico degli Italiani (in Italian). Vol. 57: Giulini–Gonzaga. Rome: Istituto dell'Enciclopedia Italiana. ISBN 978-88-12-00032-6.
