= Chiara Varotari =

Venetian artist (1584–1663)

- Born: 1584; Padua, Republic of Venice
- Died: 1664 (aged 79–80); Venice, Republic of Venice

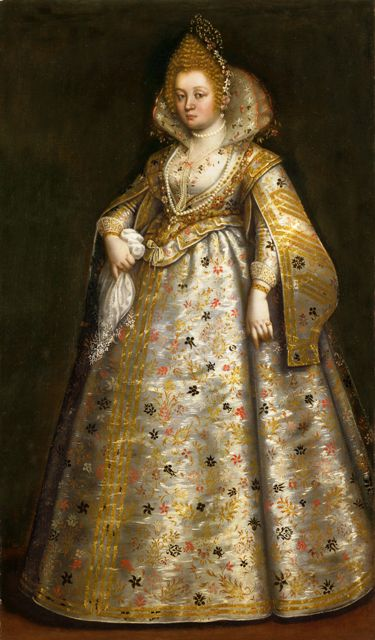
Portrait of a Lady (Pantasilea Dotto Capodilista), ca. 1630

Chiara Varotari (1584–1664) was a Venetian Baroque painter.

== Biography ==
Varotari was born in Padua. According to the Netherlands Institute for Art History (RKD) she was the daughter of Dario Varotari the Elder and the sister of Alessandro Varotari, whom she assisted with his work. Among her students was Caterina Tarabotti. She died in Venice around 1663 or 1664.
