= Correr =

Italian noble family from Venice

- Country: Republic of Venice
- Founded: 9th century
- Founder: Filippo Correr

The House of Correr or Corraro was a major patrician family in the history of the Republic of Venice. The family belonged to the Venetian nobility.

== History ==
Said to have originated in Torcello, the family moved to Venice in the 9th century and entered its Great Council during the Serrata of 1297. It is particularly notable for its clergymen, such as Pietro (Latin Patriarch of Constantinople), Angelo (elected pope Gregory XII in 1406), Angelo's nephew Antonio (a cardinal and one of the founders of the Canons Regular of San Giorgio in Alga), Francesco Antonio and Gregorio. It is also notable for producing the diplomat Pietro Correr and the art collector Teodoro Correr - the latter left his family palazzo and collection to the city in 1830, forming the Museo Correr.

== See also ==
- Palazzo Correr Contarini Zorzi
