= Bartolomea Riccoboni =

Bartolomea Riccoboni (ca 1369–1440) was a Dominican nun in the convent of Corpus Domini in Venice. She wrote a chronicle of the convent, and a necrology. She has been studied as a good example of the beginnings of women's writings in the late medieval mendicant orders. In addition to matters relating to her own convent, she records the events of the Papal Schism, in which she is an adherent of Gregory XII.
