= John of Legnano =

Italian jurist and canon lawyer

John of Legnano (Italian: Giovanni da Legnano; c. 1320 – February 1383) was an Italian jurist, a canon lawyer at the University of Bologna and the most prominent defender of Pope Urban VI at the outbreak of the Western Schism.

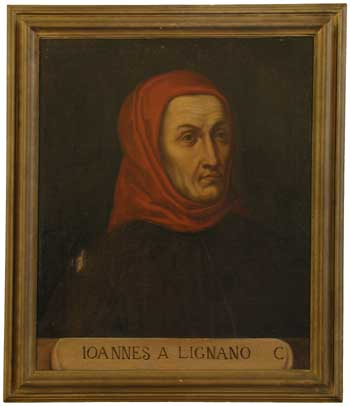
John of Legnano.

== Biography ==
John was born in Legnano.

He was a doctor utriusque iuris, in both civil and canon law, teaching at Bologna by 1351. "According to tradition, he was schooled at the University of Bologna in liberal arts, astrology, philosophy and medicine before taking his degrees in law", John P. McCall reports, suggesting that some of his backing at Bologna may have come from the Visconti of Milan, who extended their control to the south in 1350. Soon he became the loyal friend of two popes in succession — Urban V, from whom he received grants and gifts, and Gregory XI, for whom he drew up the deed of purchase for the Pontifical Gregorian University — and the most prominent defender of a third, the irascible and embattled Urban VI. Urban had multiple copies of John's defense of his election, De fletu ecclesiæ distributed in the opening maneuvers of the Western Schism, including one sent to the University of Paris, and he offered him the cardinal's hat, which John cautiously refused, being married, for one thing.

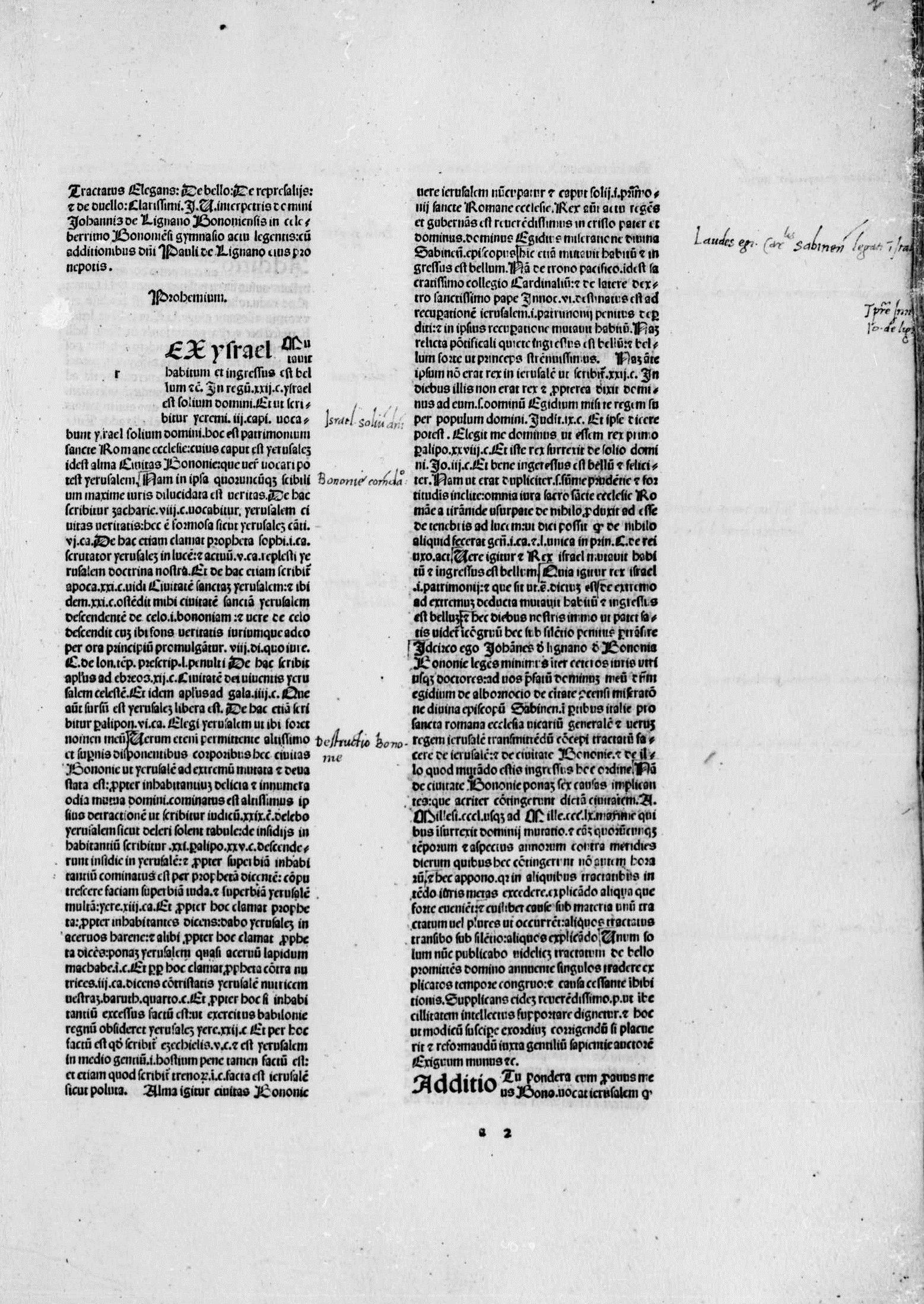
De bello, 1487

His works include De Bello, a work on war and duelling prefaced by an astrological-political allegory and dedicated to Cardinal Albornoz, papal legate who took control of Bologna in 1360, often cited as an early source in international law; De Pace (1364) on the virtues and vices and De pluritalite beneficiorum (1365), both works dedicated to Urban V; for Gregory XI he prepared his Somnium (1372) on civil and canon law, in which he revealed himself as a compiler and synthesizerand De Iuribus ecclesiæ in civitatem Bononiæ (1376), surveying the law of Bologna, among others; a Commentaria in Decretales commentary on the Decretals; and De adventu Christi (1375). He is alluded to in Chaucer’s Canterbury Tales.

He died at the height of his fame. In his will, he provided an endowment for poor students from Milan at the University of Bologna and bequeathed his house to the university if his male heirs should die out. His pupil Cosimo de' Migliorati was elected pope as Innocent VII.
