= Stefano Ugolini =

17th-century Roman Catholic bishop

Most Reverend Stefano Ugolini
- Titular Patriarch of Constantinople
- Church: Catholic Church
- Archdiocese: Latin Patriarchate of Constantinople
- In office: 1667–1681
- Predecessor: Volumnio Bandinelli
- Successor: Odoardo Cibo
- Previous post: Titular Archbishop of Corinthus

Orders
- Consecration: 11 Apr 1666 by Giulio Rospigliosi

Personal details
- Died: 10 July 1681

Stefano Ugolini (died 1681) was a Roman Catholic prelate who served as Titular Patriarch of Constantinople (1667–1681) and Titular Archbishop of Corinthus (1666–1667).

== Biography ==
On 29 Mar 1666, Stefano Ugolini was appointed during the papacy of Pope Alexander VII as Titular Archbishop of Corinthus. On 11 Apr 1666, he was consecrated bishop by Giulio Rospigliosi, Cardinal-Priest of San Sisto, with Ottaviano Carafa, Titular Archbishop of Patrae, serving as co-consecrators. On 18 Apr 1667, he was appointed during the papacy of Pope Alexander VII as Titular Patriarch of Constantinople. He served as Titular Patriarch of Constantinople until his death on 10 Jul 1681.

== Episcopal succession ==
While bishop, he was the principal consecrator of:

- Stefan Knezevic (archbishop), Archbishop of Sardica (1677);
- Gaspar Gasparini, Titular Bishop of Spiga (1677);
- Jakub Gorecki, Bishop of Bacău (1678);

and the principal co-consecrator of:

- Paluzzo Paluzzi Altieri Degli Albertoni, Bishop of Corneto e Montefiascone (1666);
- Bonifazio Albani, Archbishop of Split (1668);
- Gasparo Carpegna, Titular Archbishop of Nicaea (1670);
- Andrea Tamantini, Bishop of Cagli (1670); and
- Carlo Vincenzo Toti, Bishop of Gubbio (1672).

== External links and additional sources ==
- Cheney, David M. "Constantinople (Titular See)". Catholic-Hierarchy.org. (for Chronology of Bishops) ^{[self-published]}
- Chow, Gabriel. "Titular Patriarchal See of Constantinople (Turkey)". GCatholic.org. (for Chronology of Bishops) ^{[self-published]}

Catholic Church titles
Preceded by Giacomo Filippo Nini	Titular Archbishop of Corinthus; 1666–1667	Succeeded by Galeazzo Marescotti
Preceded by Volumnio Bandinelli	Titular Patriarch of Constantinople; 1667–1681	Succeeded by Odoardo Cibo
