= Odoardo Cibo =

Roman Catholic prelate (1619–1705)

Most Reverend Odoardo Cibo
- Titular Patriarch of Constantinople
- Church: Catholic Church
- Archdiocese: Latin Patriarchate of Constantinople
- In office: 1689–1705
- Predecessor: Stefano Ugolini
- Successor: Lodovico Pico Della Mirandola
- Previous posts: Titular Archbishop of Seleucia in Isauria (1670–1689); Apostolic Nuncio to Switzerland (1670–1679)

Personal details
- Born: 6 December 1619 Massa, Italy
- Died: 6 April 1705 (age 85)

Odoardo Cibo or Odoardo Cybo (6 December 1619 – 6 April 1705) was a Roman Catholic prelate who served as Titular Patriarch of Constantinople (1689–1705), Apostolic Nuncio to Switzerland (1670–1679), and Titular Archbishop of Seleucia in Isauria (1670–1689).

== Biography ==
Odoardo Cibo was born in Massa, Italy on 6 December 1619. On 28 July 1670, he was appointed during the papacy of Pope Clement X as Titular Archbishop of Seleucia in Isauria. On 11 August 1670, he was appointed during the papacy of Pope Clement X as Apostolic Nuncio to Switzerland. He resigned as Apostolic Nuncio to Switzerland in 1679. On 13 October 1689, he was appointed during the papacy of Pope Alexander VIII as Titular Patriarch of Constantinople. He served as Titular Patriarch of Constantinople until his death on 6 April 1705.

== Episcopal succession ==
Episcopal succession of Odoardo Cibo

While bishop, he was the principal consecrator of:

- Bernardino della Chiesa, Coadjutor Vicar Apostolic of Fo-Kien and Titular Bishop of Argos (1680);
- Diego Ortega y Escacena (Hortiago), Vicar Apostolic of Marocco and Titular Archbishop of Stauropolis (1693);
- Didacus Álvares, Archbishop of Cranganore (1694);
- Antonio Giustiniani, Bishop of Syros e Milos (1694);

and the principal co-consecrator of:

- Lorenzo Raggi, Cardinal-Bishop of Palestrina (1680);
- Francesco Berardino Corradini, Bishop of Marsi (1680);
- Pier Matteo Petrucci, Bishop of Jesi (1681);
- Sebastien Knab, Archbishop of Nachitschewan (1682);
- Urbano Sacchetti, Bishop of Viterbo e Tuscania (1683);
- Horatius Ondedei, Bishop of Urbania e Sant'Angelo in Vado (1684);
- Jan Kazimierz Denhoff, Bishop of Cesena (1687);
- Franciscus Liberati, Titular Archbishop of Ephesus (1688);
- Gianfrancesco Bembo (bishop), Bishop of Belluno (1694); and
- Giovanni Francesco Nicolai, Vicar Apostolic of Houkouang and Titular Bishop of Berytus (1700).

== External links and additional sources ==
- Cheney, David M. "Nunciature to Switzerland". Catholic-Hierarchy.org. (for Chronology of Bishops) ^{[self-published]}
- Chow, Gabriel. "Apostolic Nunciature Switzerland". GCatholic.org. Archived from the original on October 21, 2015. (for Chronology of Bishops) ^{[self-published]}
- Cheney, David M. "Seleucia in Isauria (Titular See)". Catholic-Hierarchy.org. (for Chronology of Bishops) ^{[self-published]}
- Chow, Gabriel. "Titular Metropolitan See of Seleucia in Isauria (Turkey)". GCatholic.org. (for Chronology of Bishops) ^{[self-published]}
- Cheney, David M. "Constantinople (Titular See)". Catholic-Hierarchy.org. (for Chronology of Bishops) ^{[self-published]}
- Chow, Gabriel. "Titular Patriarchal See of Constantinople (Turkey)". GCatholic.org. (for Chronology of Bishops) ^{[self-published]}

Catholic Church titles
Preceded by Girolamo Grimaldi-Cavalleroni	Titular Archbishop of Seleucia in Isauria; 1670–1689	Succeeded by Andrea Santacroce
Preceded by Rodolpho Acquaviva	Apostolic Nuncio to Switzerland; 1670–1679	Succeeded by Giacomo Cantelmo
Preceded by Stefano Ugolini	Titular Patriarch of Constantinople; 1689–1705	Succeeded by Lodovico Pico Della Mirandola
