= Corpus Domini (Venice) =

Church of Corpus Domini
- Chiesa del Corpus Domini
- Church of Corpus Domini
- Location: Venice, Italy
- Country: Republic of Venice
- Denomination: Roman Catholic

History
- Status: Demolished

The Church of Corpus Domini in Venice was founded as a convent for Dominican nuns in 1394 under the patronage of John Dominici. It stood on the north side of the Grand Canal on the easternmost point where the canal opens into the sea, next to the church of St. Lucia. The convent was dissolved in 1810, and subsequently demolished. Later in the 19th century the whole quarter was demolished to make room for the St. Lucia railway station.

One of its most famous early nuns was Bartolomea Riccoboni, who wrote a chronicle and necrology of the convent. In the 17th century the painter Bartolommeo Scaligero provided the church with important art work.
