= Pope Innocent VII =

Head of the Catholic Church from 1404 to 1406

- Bishop of Rome
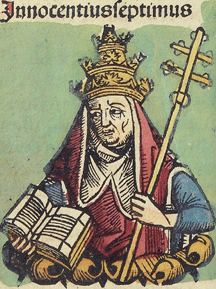
- Miniature of Innocent VII in the Nuremberg Chronicle (1493)
- Church: Catholic Church
- Papacy began: 17 October 1404
- Papacy ended: 6 November 1406
- Predecessor: Boniface IX
- Successor: Gregory XII
- Opposed to: Avignon claimant: Benedict XIII
- Previous posts: Archbishop of Ravenna (1387-1389); Bishop of Bologna (1389-1390); Apostolic Administrator of Ravenna (1389–1400); Cardinal-Priest of Santa Croce in Gerusalemme (1389–1404); Camerlengo of the Sacred College of Cardinals (1396–1404)

Orders
- Consecration: 5 December 1387
- Created cardinal: 18 December 1389 by Boniface IX

Personal details
- Born: Cosimo de' Migliorati; 1339 Sulmona, Kingdom of Naples
- Died: 6 November 1406 (aged 66–67) Rome, Papal States
- Coat of arms: Innocent VII's coat of arms

Papal styles of Pope Innocent VII
- Reference style: His Holiness
- Spoken style: Your Holiness
- Religious style: Holy Father
- Posthumous style: None

Pope Innocent VII (Latin: Innocentius VII; Italian: Innocenzo VII; 1339 – 6 November 1406), born Cosimo de' Migliorati, was head of the Catholic Church from 17 October 1404 to his death. He was pope during the period of the Western Schism (1378–1417), and was opposed by the Avignon claimant Benedict XIII. Despite good intentions, he did little to end the schism, owing to the troubled state of affairs in Rome, and his distrust of the sincerity of Benedict XIII, and King Ladislaus of Naples.

== Early life ==
Cosimo de' Migliorati was born to a noble family of Sulmona in the Abruzzi, son of Gentile Migliorati and Mascia Oderisi. He was the uncle of cardinal Giovanni Migliorati. He distinguished himself by his learning in both civil and Canon Law, which he taught for a time at Perugia and Padua. His teacher Giovanni da Legnano sponsored him at Rome, where Pope Urban VI (1378–1389) took him into the Curia, sent him for ten years as papal collector to England, made him Bishop of Bologna in 1386 at a time of strife in that city, and Archbishop of Ravenna in 1387.

Pope Boniface IX made him cardinal-priest of Santa Croce in Gerusalemme (1389) and sent him as legate to Lombardy and Tuscany in 1390. When Boniface IX died, there were present in Rome delegates from the rival pope at Avignon, Benedict XIII. The Roman cardinals asked these delegates whether their master would abdicate if the cardinals refrained from holding an election. When they were bluntly told that Benedict XIII would never abdicate (indeed he never did), the cardinals proceeded to an election. First, however, they each undertook a solemn oath to leave nothing undone, and, if need be, lay down the tiara to end the schism.

== Papacy ==
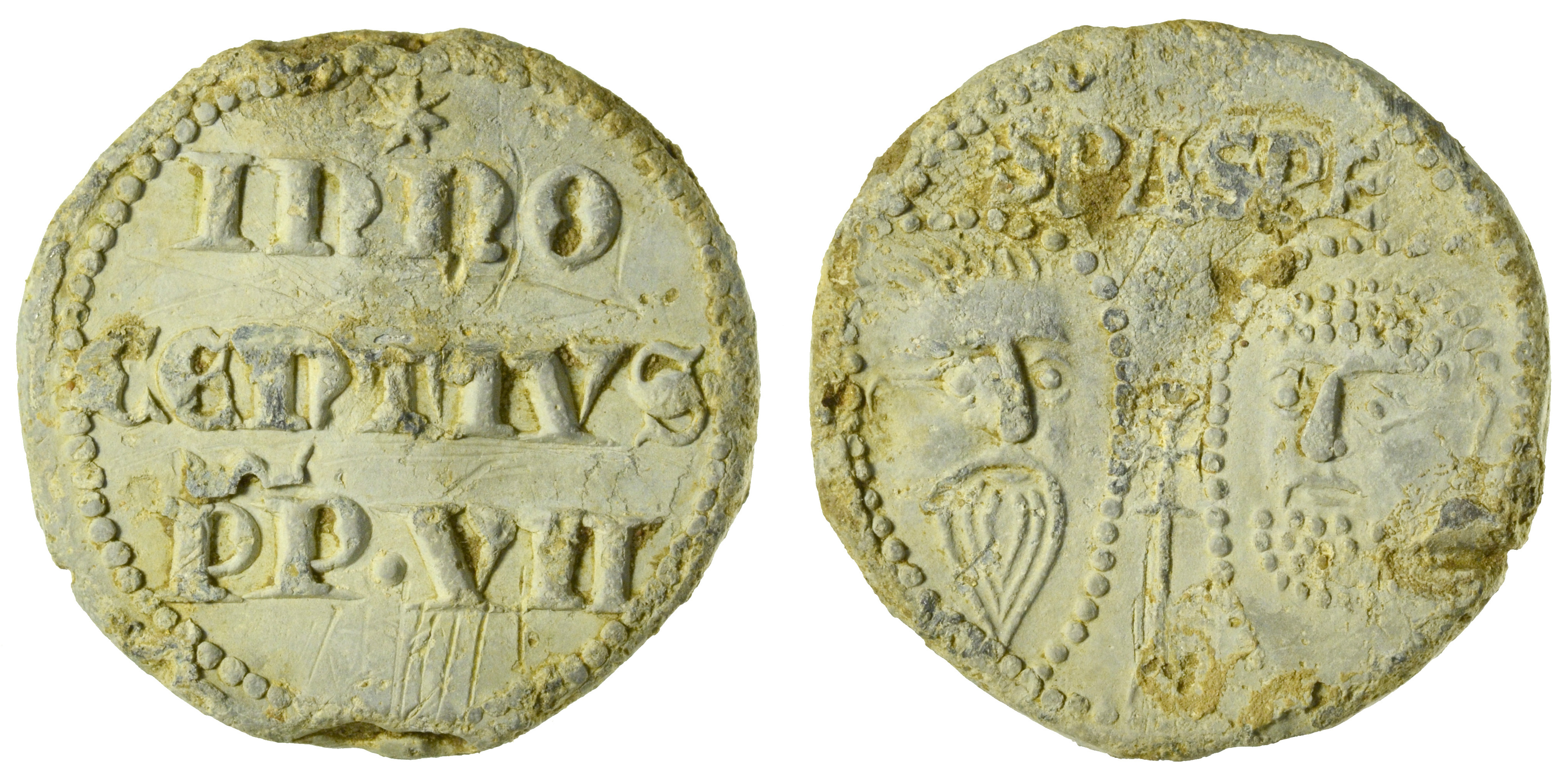
Papal bulla of Innocent VII

Migliorati was unanimously chosen – by nine cardinals – on 17 October 1404 and took the name of Innocent VII. There was a general riot by the Ghibelline party in Rome when news of his election got out, but peace was maintained by the aid of King Ladislaus of Naples, who hastened to Rome with a band of soldiers to assist the Pope in suppressing the insurrection. For his services the king extorted various concessions from Innocent VII, among them the promise that Ladislaus' claim to Naples would not be compromised, which claim had been challenged until very recently by Louis II of Anjou. That suited Innocent VII, who had no intention of reaching an agreement with Avignon that would compromise his claims to the Papal States. Thus Innocent VII was laid under embarrassing obligations, from which he freed himself.

Innocent VII had made the great mistake of elevating his highly unsuitable nephew Ludovico Migliorati – a colorful condottiero formerly in the pay of Giangaleazzo Visconti of Milan – to be Captain of the Papal Militia, an act of nepotism that cost him dearly. Innocent further named him the rector of Todi in April 1405. In August 1405, Ludovico Migliorati, using his power as head of the militia, seized eleven members of the obstreperous Roman partisans on their return from a conference with the Pope, had them murdered in his own house, and had their bodies thrown from the windows of the hospital of Santo Spirito into the street. There was an uproar. Pope, court and cardinals, with the Migliorati faction, fled towards Viterbo. Ludovico took the occasion of driving off cattle that were grazing outside the walls, and the Papal party were pursued by furious Romans, losing thirty members, whose bodies were abandoned in the flight, including the Abbot of Perugia, struck down under the eyes of the Pope.

Innocent's protector Ladislaus sent a squad of troops to quell the riots, and by January 1406 the Romans again acknowledged Papal temporal authority, and Innocent VII felt able to return. But Ladislaus, not content with the former concessions, desired to extend his authority in Rome and the Papal States. To attain his end he aided the Ghibelline faction in Rome in their revolutionary attempts in 1405. A squad of troops which King Ladislaus had sent to the aid of the Colonna faction was still occupying the Castle of Sant' Angelo, ostensibly protecting the Vatican, but making frequent sorties upon Rome and the neighbouring territory. Only after Ladislaus was excommunicated did he yield to the demands of the Pope and withdraw his troops.

Shortly after his accession in 1404 Innocent VII had taken steps to keep his oath by proclaiming a council to resolve the Western Schism. King Charles VI of France, theologians at the University of Paris, such as Pierre d'Ailly and Jean Gerson, and King Rupert of Germany, were all urging such a meeting. However, the troubles of 1405 furnished him with a pretext for postponing the meeting, claiming that he could not guarantee safe passage to his rival Benedict XIII if he came to the council in Rome. Benedict, however, made it appear that the only obstacle to the end of the Schism was the unwillingness of Innocent VII. Innocent VII was unreceptive to the proposal that he as well as Benedict XIII should resign in the interests of peace.

== Death ==
Innocent died in Rome on 6 November 1406.

== See also ==
- Cardinals created by Innocent VII
- List of popes

== Sources ==
- Hanna, Ralph (2022). "Richard Rolle's 'Valde Intimus Socius': A Search for William Stoups". In Saunders, Corinne; Lawrie, Richard (eds.). Middle English Manuscripts and their Legacies: A Volume in Honour of Ian Doyle. Brill. pp. 9–25. ISBN 978-90-04-47214-3.
- Lightbown, Ronald (2004). Carlo Crivelli. Yale University Press.
- Morrissey, Thomas E. (2000). "Peter of Candia at Padua and Venice in March 1406. A Critical Edition". In Bellitto, Christopher M.; Izbicki, Thomas M. (eds.). Reform and Renewal in the Middle Ages and the Renaissance: Studies in Honor of Louis Pascoe, S.J. Brill. pp. 155–173. ISBN 90 04 11399 1.
- Walsh, Michael (2003). The Conclave: A Sometimes Secret and Occasionally Bloody History of Papal Elections. Rowman & Littlefield. ISBN 9781461601814.

Catholic Church titles
Preceded by Boniface IX	Pope; 17 October 1404 – 6 November 1406; Avignon claimant: Benedict XIII	Succeeded by Gregory XII
