= Padovanino =

Venetian painter (1588–1649)

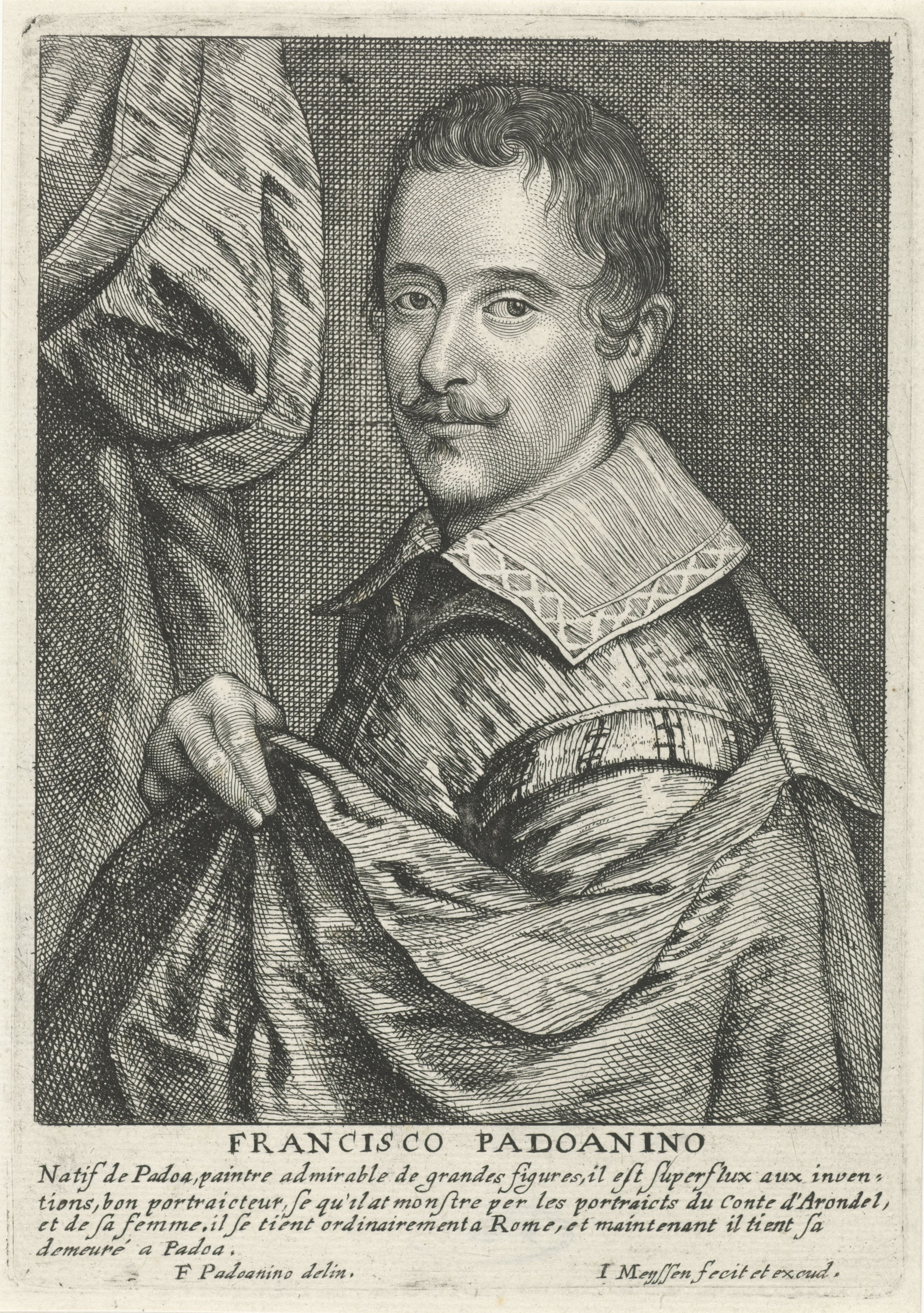
- Padovanino in Het Gulden Cabinet.
- Born: Alessandro Leone Varotari; 4 April 1588; Padua, Republic of Venice
- Died: 20 July 1649 (aged 61); Venice, Republic of Venice
- Known for: Painting
- Movement: Mannerism

Alessandro Leone Varotari (4 April 1588 – 20 July 1649), also commonly known as Il Padovanino, was a Venetian painter of the late-Mannerist and early-Baroque Venetian school, best known for having mentored Pietro Liberi, Giulio Carpioni, and Bartolommeo Scaligero. He was the son of Dario Varotari the Elder and the brother of painter Chiara Varotari, who accompanied him on his travels and assisted with his work.

== Biography ==
Born in Padua, from which his nickname derives, he was the son of the local painter and architect Dario Varotari the Elder, who most probably provided his earliest training. Early paintings such as The incredulity of St. Thomas, Virgin and Child, and the Pentecost show the influence of Titian. Padovanino married Caterina Mesa 1612 in Padua. He moved to Venice in 1614. He is known to have traveled to Rome twice (in the mid-1610s and in 1625), where he was much employed in producing copies of major paintings by major Renaissance artists of the prior generation. In 1619, he worked on the mosaics of the Basilica of San Marco. In the following years he worked on decorating the interior of the Church of Santa Maria Maggiore. In 1625 he made another trip to Rome. He painted a major battle canvas entitled The victory of the Carnuti (Celts) over the Normans. His pupils included Pietro Liberi, Bartolommeo Scaligero, Pietro della Vecchia, Giulio Carpioni and his own son, Dario Varotari the Younger. His sister Chiara Varotari was a well known portraitist. Among his students was Caterina Tarabotti.

== Style ==
Padovanino was a highly respected artist in his time. Although he had earned much of his fame due to his talents as a copyist, he still deserves a place in the history of painting. He had learned painting in the style of Titian, to whose spirit and style he was faithful throughout his career. His career lasted well into the seventeenth century. His paintings are characterized for their narrative ability and their sensuality.

Padovanino's paintings

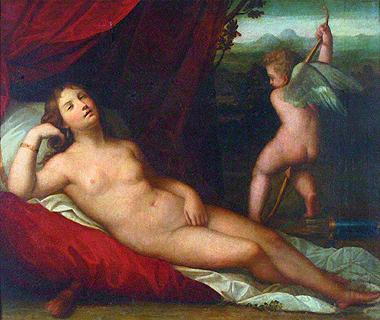
Venus and Cupid

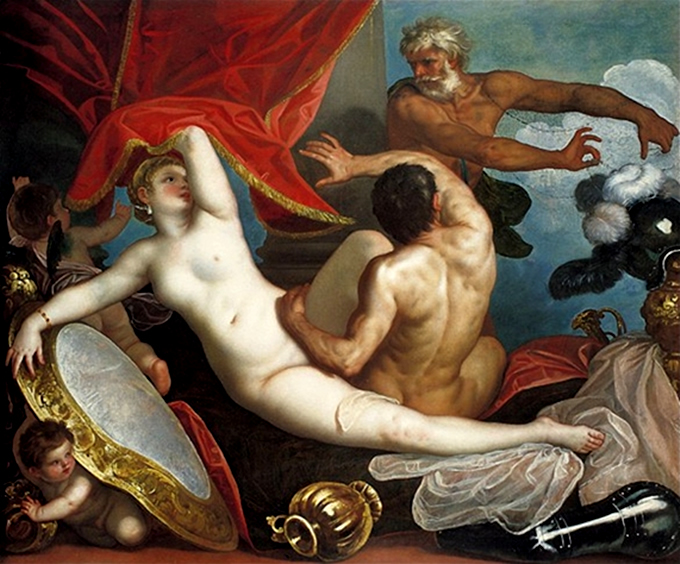
Venus and Mars Surprised by Vulcan

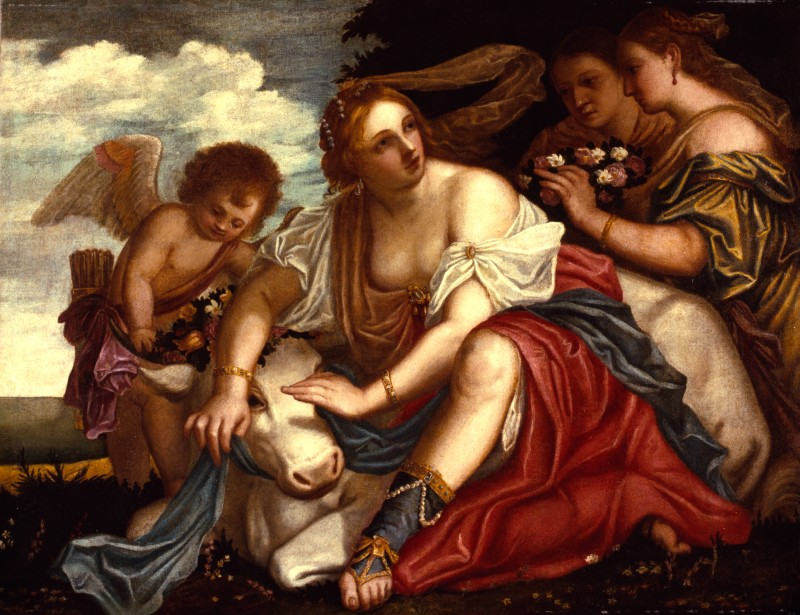
Rape of Europa

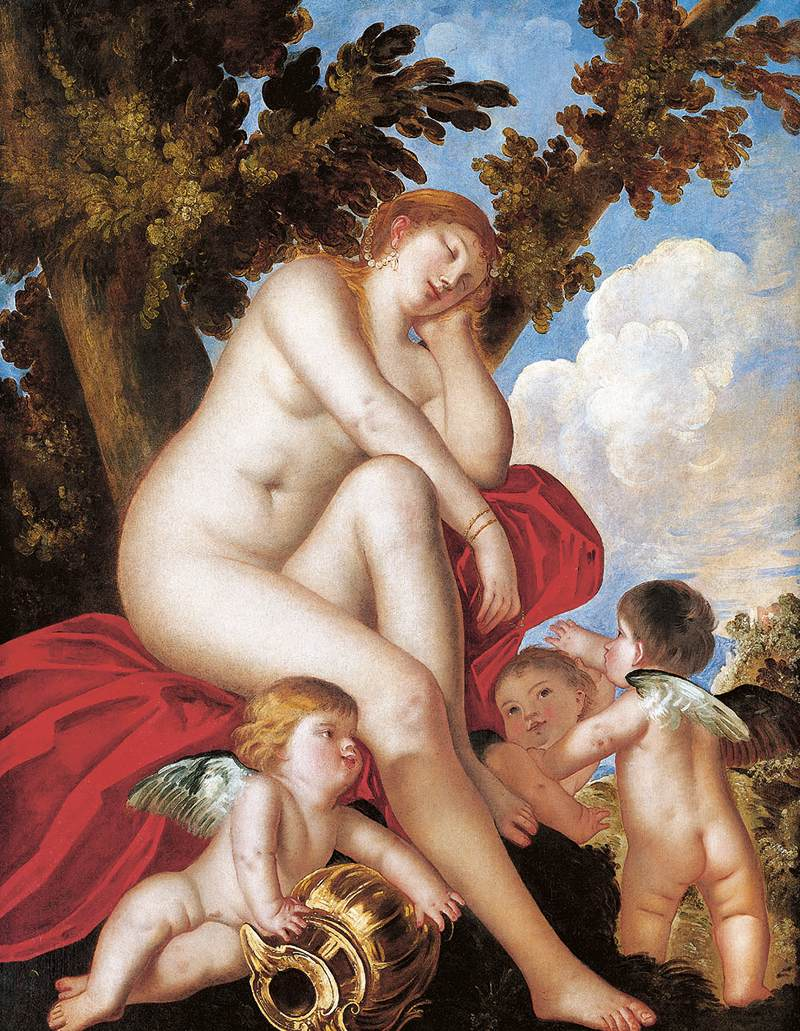
Venus sleeping with angels

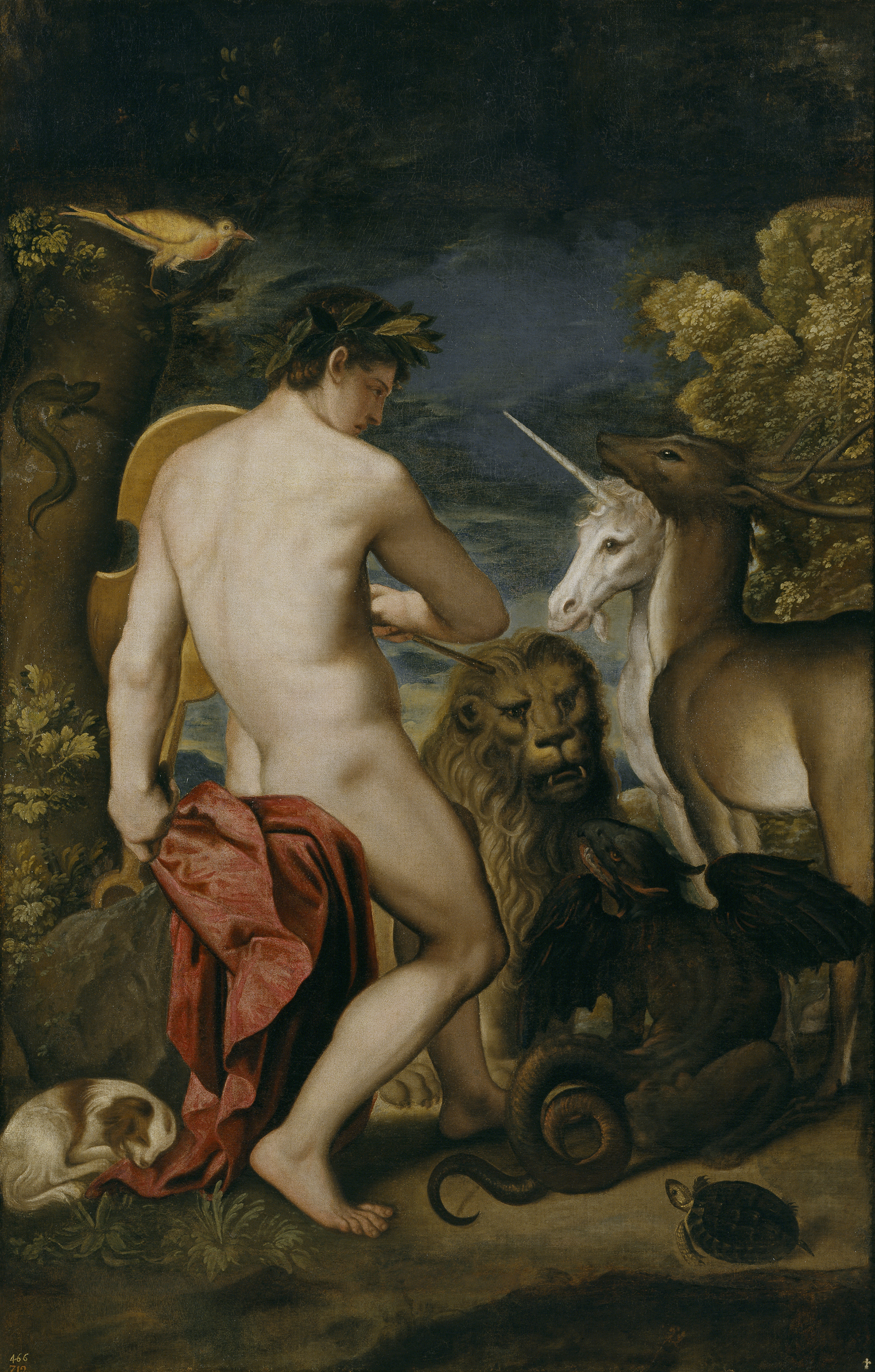
Orfeus

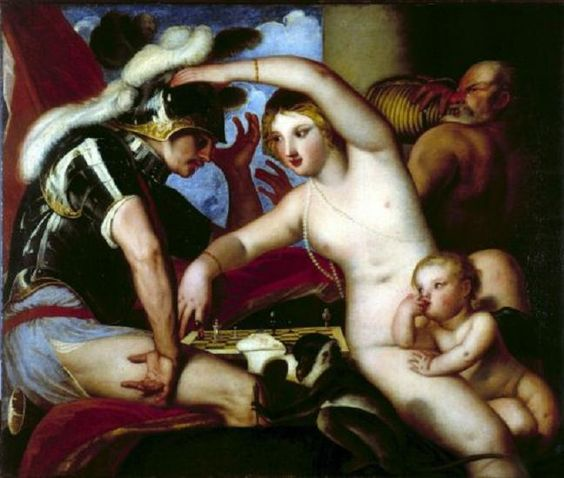
Mars and Venus playing Chess
