= Francesco Antonio Correr =

Italian bishop

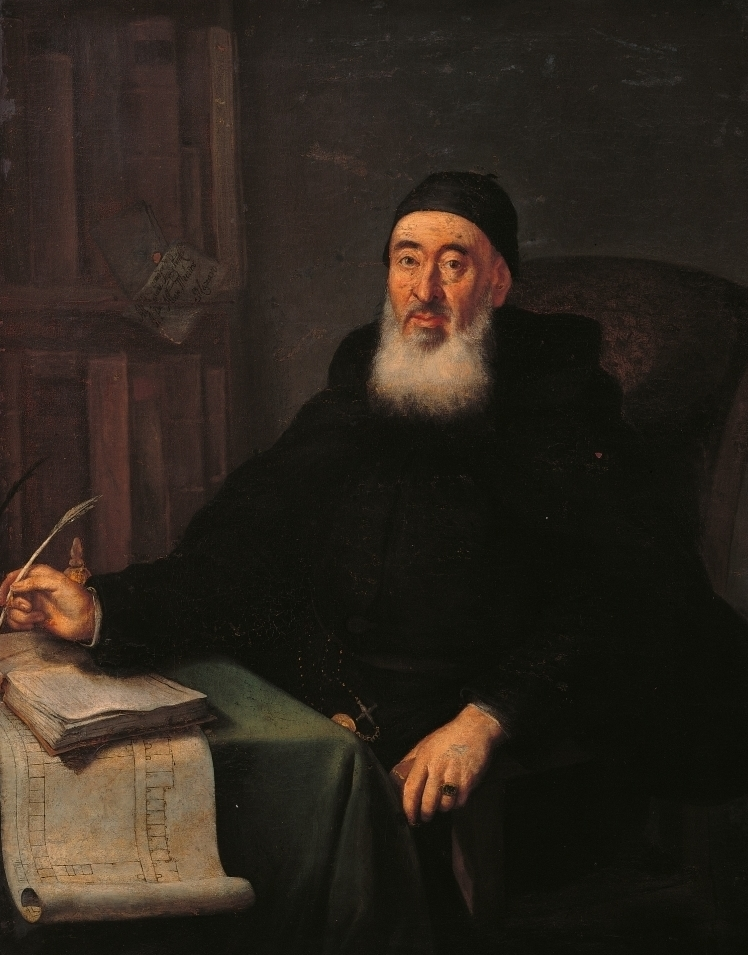
Image of Francesco Antonio Correr

Francesco Antonio Correr (7 October 1676 - 17 May 1741) was an Italian Roman Catholic bishop and patriarch.

== Life ==
He was born in Venice into the Correr family. He was ordained a priest of the Capuchin Order on 16 April 1730 at Il Redentore. On 1 December 1734 he was made Patriarch of Venice and was consecrated as a bishop on 30 June the following year. He died in 1741 at Villa Correr in Altaura, near Montagnana. His body was taken to Venice and buried in St Mark's Basilica.
