= Francesco Antonio Marcucci =

Italian bishop

Venerable Francesco Antonio Marcucci TOFS
- Church: Roman Catholic Church
- Diocese: Montalto
- See: Montalto
- Appointed: 6 August 1770
- Term ended: 19 July 1798
- Predecessor: Giuseppe Maria Centini
- Successor: Francesco Saverio Castiglione (later Pius VIII)
- Other post: Titular Patriarch of Constantinople (1781-1798)

Orders
- Ordination: 25 February 1741
- Consecration: 15 August 1770 by Giovanni Francesco Albani
- Rank: Bishop; Patriarch

Personal details
- Born: Francesco Antonio Marcucci; 27 November 1717 Force, Ascoli Piceno, Marche, Papal States
- Died: 12 July 1798 (aged 80) Montalto delle Marche, Ascoli Piceno, Marche, Papal States

Francesco Antonio Marcucci (27 November 1717 – 12 July 1798) was a Roman Catholic Italian bishop and a member of the Secular Franciscan Order. Marcucci was also the founder of the Pious Workers of Mary Immaculate.

Marcucci was declared to have lived a life of heroic Christian virtue and was proclaimed to be Venerable in 2010 after Pope Benedict XVI ratified a decree. The miracle that is required for his beatification is now under investigation in the Congregation for the Causes of Saints.

== Biography ==
Francesco Antonio Marcucci was born into the nobility in 1717 as the son of Leopoldo Marcucci and Giovanna Battista Gigli. He was drawn to the priesthood despite the objection of his parents. Marcucci travelled to Rome after his mother died and he studied in colleges that the Dominicans, Jesuits and Franciscans ran with the support of his aunt, Francesca Gastaldi. Marcucci later met Leonard of Port Maurice in April 1739 and would write the "Introduction on Evangelic Preaching" in 1740. He was later ordained to the priesthood on 25 February 1741.

He felt a call to the Franciscan life and became a member of the Secular Franciscan Order. He would later go on to found the Pious Workers of Mary Immaculate on 8 December 1774. He assisted in the teaching of the female religious and served as their spiritual advisor. He also organized schools and would publish text books.

He was appointed as the Bishop of Montalto and received episcopal consecration on 15 August 1770. It was Cardinal Giovanni Francesco Albani who consecrated him. He was a friend of Paul of the Cross who predicted that Marcucci would be canonized. As the head of his diocese it was Marcucci who would visit the parishes and would hold retreats for the priests. He was appointed as the Titular Patriarch of Constantinople in 1781 and also served as both the confessor and the advisor to Pope Clement XIV.

He died in 1798.

== Cause of beatification ==
The cause of beatification was introduced in 1964 and he was named a Servant of God. Pope Benedict XVI declared him to have lived a life of heroic virtue and proclaimed him to be Venerable on 27 March 2010.

A miracle alleged to have been attributed to his intercession was discovered and an independent process of evaluation opened and was closed in 2005. The validation of that process was ratified on 19 June 2006 and a medical board for the Congregation for the Causes of Saints approved the miracle twice in 2010 and in 2011. The pope must approve the miracle before Marcucci can be beatified.
