= Volumnio Bandinelli =

Italian cardinal (1598–1667)

His Eminence Volumnio Bandinelli
- Cardinal-Priest of Santi Silvestro e Martino ai Monti
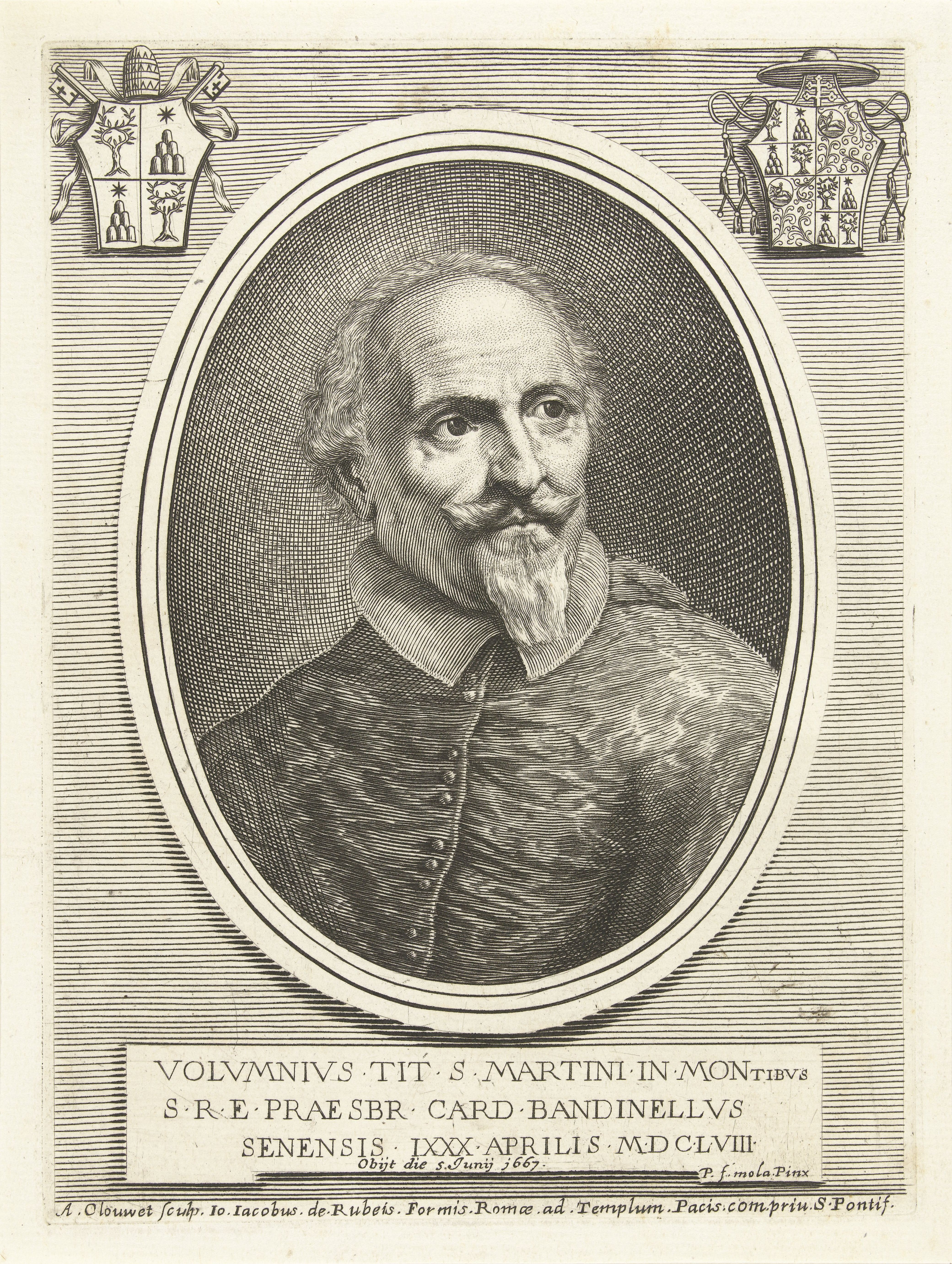
- Church: Catholic Church

Orders
- Consecration: 10 Jun 1658 by Scipione Pannocchieschi d'Elci

Personal details
- Born: 1598 Siena, Italy
- Died: 5 Jun 1667 (age 69)

Volumnio Bandinelli (1598–1667) was a Roman Catholic cardinal.

== Biography ==
On 10 Jun 1658, he was consecrated bishop by Scipione Pannocchieschi d'Elci, Archbishop of Pisa, with Neri Corsini, Titular Archbishop of Tamiathis, and Carlo de' Vecchi, Bishop Emeritus of Chiusi, serving as co-consecrators.

Catholic Church titles
Preceded by Giambattista Spada	Titular Patriarch of Constantinople; 1658–1660	Succeeded by Stefano Ugolini
Preceded by Federico Sforza	Cardinal-Priest of Santi Silvestro e Martino ai Monti; 1660–1667	Succeeded by Giulio Spinola
