= John Dominici =

Italian Catholic prelate and Dominican

Blessed Giovanni Dominici O.P.
- Apostolic Administrator of Bova
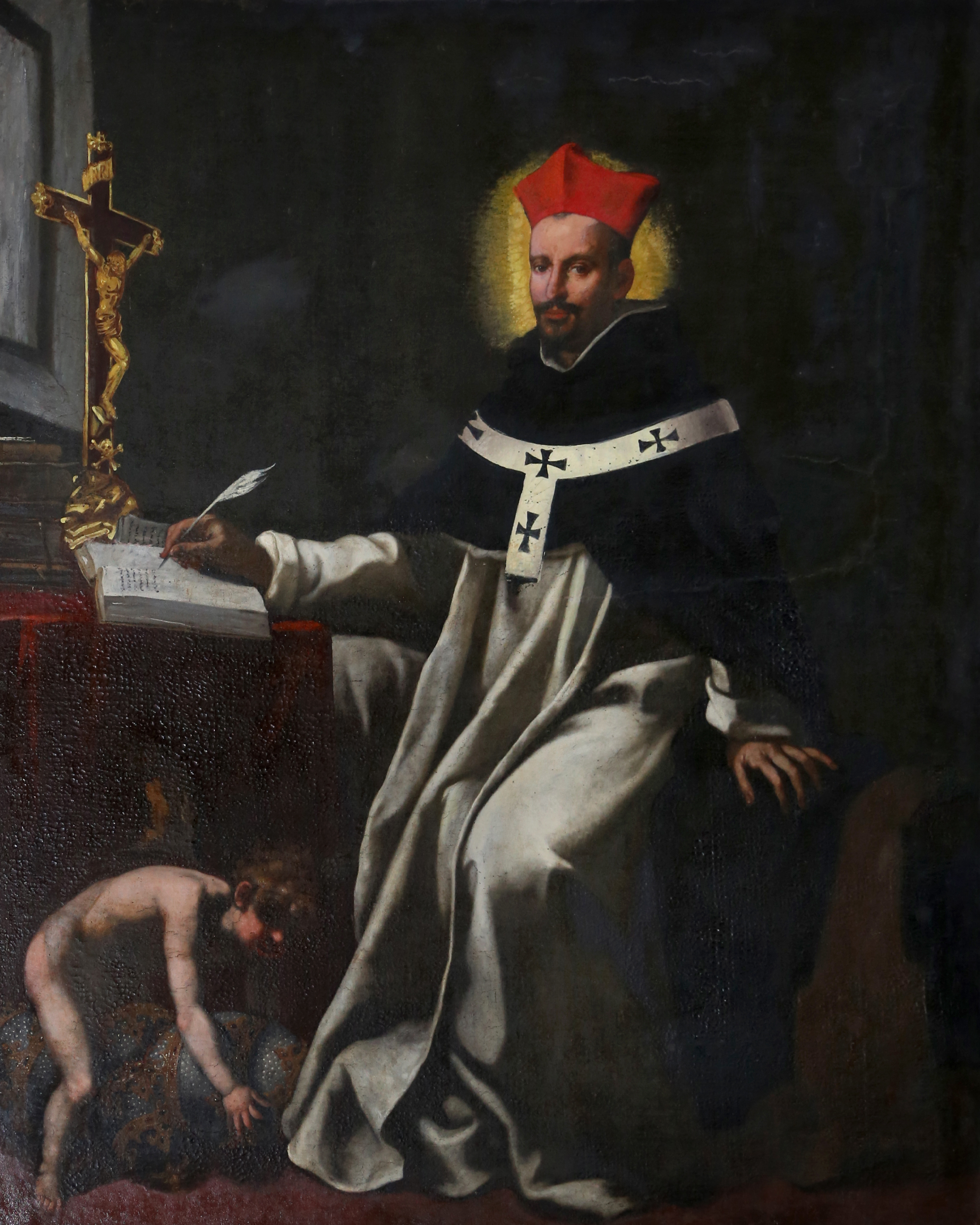
- Painting of Giovanni Dominici at Santa Maria Novella, Florence
- Church: Catholic Church
- Diocese: Bova
- Appointed: 21 April 1412
- Term ended: 10 June 1419
- Predecessor: Nicolas
- Successor: Sante
- Other posts: Cardinal-Priest of San Sisto (1408–19); Protopriest of the College of Cardinals (1412–19); Major Penitentiary of the Apostolic Penitentiary (1408-15); Apostolic Administrator of Melfi-Rapolla-Venosa (1412); Apostolic Administrator of Nicotera-Tropea (1910); Archbishop of Ragusa (1408–09)

Orders
- Ordination: 1380
- Consecration: c. 1408
- Created cardinal: 9 May 1409 by Pope Gregory XII
- Rank: Cardinal-Priest

Personal details
- Born: Giovanni Dominici c. 1355 Florence, Republic of Florence
- Died: 10 June 1419 (aged 64) Buda, Kingdom of Hungary
- Buried: Church of Saint Paul the Hermit, Buda, Hungary
- Denomination: Catholic

Sainthood
- Feast day: 10 June
- Venerated in: Catholic Church
- Beatified: 9 April 1832; Saint Peter's Basilica, Papal States by Pope Gregory XVI

Giovanni Dominici, OP (English: John Dominic c. 1355 – 10 June 1419) was an Italian Catholic prelate and Dominican who became a cardinal. His ideas had a profound influence on the art of Fra Angelico, who entered the Dominicans through him.

Dominici originally encountered difficulties becoming a friar due to a speech impairment that his superiors believed would rule him ineligible for both profession and the priesthood. Despite this, Dominici became a noted theologian and preacher and was tireless in establishing monasteries and convents in cities such as Fiesole and Lucca.

He attempted to resign his cardinalate in 1415 during the Council of Constance after he succeeded in convincing the pope to abdicate in order to end the Western Schism. The council refused to accept his resignation, though he had resigned from the archbishopric that he held. He spent the remainder of his life as a papal legate for Pope Martin V until he died in Buda.

He had been first named as a Blessed since 1622 though he had not been recognized as such until he was beatified on 9 April 1832.

== Life ==
Giovanni Dominici was born in Florence in c. 1355 to the poor but devout Domenico Dominici (a silk merchant) and Paola Zorzi. His father died while his mother was pregnant with Giovanni.

In his childhood he spent hours in the Dominican-run Santa Maria Novella church. If someone needed to see him, his mother directed them to the church and said: "There he spends all his hours". It therefore stood to reason that in 1370 he sought admission into the order. But he suffered from a severe speech impairment which – combined with a lack of formal education – made the friars doubt his vocation to their order. They refused him admission a number of times until 1372 and even insisted that he should remain home to care for his mother. But his mother insisted that Dominici should follow his calling for it was not for her to stand against his religious calling.

He was then accepted and began his novitiate with the friars there and he began his studies in Pisa and Florence. The friars were surprised to see that he had a sharp mind with a good grasp of the complexities of theological and philosophical subject so much so that he was sent to the college in Paris to further his studies. On his return from Paris when he completed his theological studies his speech impairment became the problem which the authorities of the order had feared from the beginning. Preaching was an expected part of each friar's life which would prove to be problematic for Dominici. He sought the intercession of the Dominican secular Saint Catherine of Siena and he was cured of this impairment. Dominici was ordained to the priesthood in 1380. He was then appointed as a professor and preacher and held that post for over a decade in Venice. Dominici became the prior for the order's house at Santa Maria Novella in 1381 and retained the position until serving as the prior from 1386 to 1387. He was teaching at San Zanipolo in Venice from 1388 until 1389 when he left.

In 1392 he was appointed as the Vicar Provincial for the Roman province of the order in 1392. It was a time of disorder for the Dominicans for the order had suffered major losses in membership through a great plague. The priory in Venice had lost 77 friars in a matter of months as an example. The Master General Raymond of Capua authorized Dominici to establish priories of strict observance in Venice (1394) and Fiesole (1406). It was in the latter that the talented artists and brothers Giovanni and Benedetto entered the order around 1407. Giovanni would later be known as Fra Angelico. Dominici also founded the Corpus Domini convent in Venice for the Dominican nuns of the strict observance; an account of his life was found in the chronicle and necrology of that place after Bartolomea Riccoboni discovered it. He also corresponded with Chiara Gambacorti and advised her on how to restore discipline to Dominican nuns.

Dominici received into the order on 4 August 1405 four men which included the future Archbishop of Florence Antoninus after the latter heard him preach once. The two worked together in Fiesole. Vincent Ferrer was once preaching in Genoa when an invitation was extended for him to preach in Florence. But Ferrer said he would not since a saint (Dominici) was among their number and was preaching.

Dominici was sent as the Venetian representative to the papal conclave of 1406 in which Pope Gregory XII was elected. He soon became the counsellor and confessor for the pope who on 26 March 1408 appointed him as the Archbishop of Ragusa. In mid-1408 the pope named him as a cardinal and sent him as ambassador to the Hungarian kingdom to secure the adhesion of Sigismund to the pope. On 26 March 1408 he was sent with Giacopo del Torso to negotiate with Antipope Benedict XIII in an attempt to secure the latter's abdication though this was unsuccessful.

Dominici was present at the Council of Constance (which he convinced the pope to convoke) on 4 July 1415 when he read the resignation letter that the pope had written. Dominici had advised the pope to abdicate as the surest means of ending the Great Schism which had arisen to divide the Church. It was also at that point that he tried to resign his cardinalate to make clear to all that he had no desire to advance through his accomplishment. But the Council rejected that resignation and he remained as a cardinal. It had been before this that he tried to convince Antipope John XXIII to abdicate though that proved useless. Pope Martin V (who sometimes sought his counsel) appointed him as the papal legate to Bohemia on 19 July 1418 but he accomplished little with the followers of John Hus owing to the timid King Wenceslaus IV. But he had been present when Hus was burnt at the stake back in 1415.

On 23 July 1409 he was named as the abbot commendatario for the Santi Andrea e Saba convent while named provost commendatario for the Santa Maria dell'Isola Tremici convent. On 1 January 1411 he was appointed as a legate to both Genoa and Milan. He later was named as the abbot commendatario for the Benedictine convent of Santi Vito e Salvo on 13 January 1411.

Dominici died at Buda on 10 June 1419 from a fever and he was buried in the Saint Paul the Hermit church there. His tomb became a site of miracles and his remains were venerated until the destruction of the church during a Turkish invasion. Antoninus of Florence later wrote a memoir on Dominici.

=== Beatification ===
Dominici's holiness had been renowned during his life and he was venerated soon after his death with miracles being reported at his tomb. Pope Gregory XVI beatified Dominici centuries later on 9 April 1832.

== Published works ==
Dominici was a prolific writer on spiritual subjects but he was also a graceful poet; his vernacular songs or Laudi show his tact as a poet. His Regola del governo di cura familiare, written between 1400 and 1405 is a pedagogical work which treats (in four books) of the faculties of the soul as well as the powers and senses of people. He also touched on the uses of material goods and the education of children.

His Lucula Noctis (which he addressed to the Chancellor of the Florentine Republic Coluccio Salutati) is the most important treatise of that time on the studies of the pagan authors. Dominici did not condemn classical studies outright though did express strong criticism of some humanist tendencies such as the use of rhetoric in politics and the rise of the professional politician.

There is now an Open Access revised edition of Hunt's 1940 critical edition of the Lucula provided on The Manipulus/Lucula noctis Project website.
