= Thomas Morosini =

First Latin Patriarch of Constantinople

Thomas Morosini (c. 1170/1175 - June/July 1211) was a Venetian cleric who served as the first Latin Patriarch of Constantinople following the conquest of the city by the Fourth Crusade. He was elected in 1204 and remained patriarch until his death.

== Election and appointment ==
Under the agreement concluded between the Venetians and the other crusaders in March 1204, the party that did not provide the new emperor was entitled to appoint the clergy of Hagia Sophia and elect the patriarch. After Baldwin of Flanders was elected emperor, the Venetian clergy of Hagia Sophia chose Morosini, then a subdeacon, as patriarch.

The election was conducted without papal authorisation and was initially denounced by Pope Innocent III as uncanonical. Innocent objected that the Venetian clergy who elected Morosini had not themselves been canonically installed at Hagia Sophia and that secular agreements could not determine the appointment of a patriarch. Nevertheless, because Morosini was not personally responsible for the irregular procedure, Innocent confirmed his election. Morosini travelled to Rome, where he was successively ordained deacon and priest, consecrated as a bishop, and invested with the pallium.

== Patriarchate ==
Morosini's patriarchate was marked by disputes involving papal authority, Venetian interests and the position of non-Venetian clergy. Although Innocent confirmed his appointment, the pope sought to prevent the patriarchate and the cathedral chapter of Hagia Sophia from becoming exclusively Venetian. Morosini was accused of favouring Venetian clerics in appointments and of excluding clergy of other nationalities. Innocent consequently authorised papal legates to intervene in appointments and required Morosini to accept non-Venetian canons into the cathedral chapter.

Morosini also disputed ecclesiastical appointments and jurisdiction with the Latin emperors and with French clergy in Constantinople. The cathedral chapter claimed authority over the election of the patriarch, while the clergy of the city's conventual churches asserted a right to participate. Conflicts also arose over control of churches and revenues that had been divided between the Venetians and the other crusaders after the conquest.

The Latin Church faced severe financial and administrative difficulties because much Byzantine ecclesiastical property had been appropriated by secular crusaders after 1204. Morosini participated with papal legates and the imperial authorities in attempts to obtain land, tithes and other revenues for the new ecclesiastical establishment. These arrangements produced further disputes between the patriarch, the Latin clergy, the emperor and the papal representatives over the allocation of church income.

Morosini's dealings with the Greek clergy reflected Innocent III's policy of bringing the Byzantine Church under papal authority while permitting the limited continuation of the Greek rite. Greek bishops who accepted papal supremacy and the authority of the Latin patriarch could retain their sees, while Greek priests continued to serve local parishes. Nevertheless, some Greek clerics resisted the authority of the Latin prelates and continued to adhere to the Greek rite.

== Death and succession ==
Morosini died at Thessalonica in June or July 1211. His death was followed by a disputed election involving the Venetian cathedral chapter and the clergy of Constantinople's conventual churches. The patriarchal see remained unfilled until Pope Innocent III appointed Gervasius of Heraclea in 1215.
