= Bartolommeo Scaligero =

Venetian painter

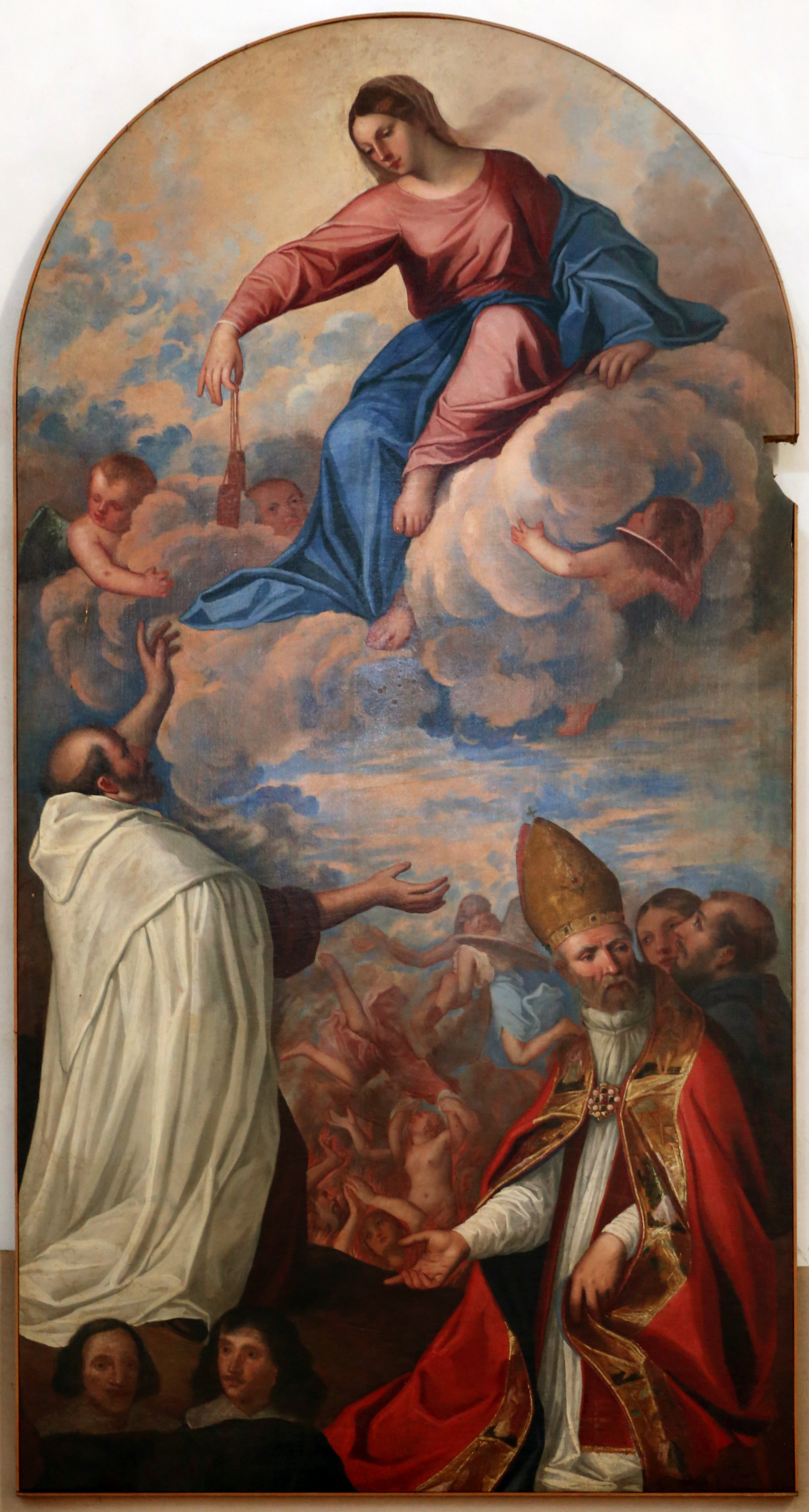
Madonna of Carmel, Santi Maria e Donato, Murano, Venice

Bartolommeo Scaligero (born c. 1605 – ?) was a Venetian painter of the Baroque. He was born in Padua, and trained with Alessandro Varotari, and was active in Venice. He painted for the church of Corpus Domini in Venice. His niece, Lucia Scaligero, was also a painter.
