= Caterina Tarabotti =

Venetian artist

- Born: 15 June 1615; Venice, Republic of Venice
- Died: 8 February 1693; Venice, Republic of Venice
- Other names: Tarabotta
- Occupation: Painter
- Relatives: Arcangela Tarabotti (sister)

Caterina Agnese Tarabotti (baptised 15 June 1615 – 8 February 1693) was a Venetian painter of the Baroque period. She was born in Venice, and a pupil of Alessandro Varotari, called Padovanino, (1588-1649) and his sister Chiara (1584-1663 c.a). The sister of proto-feminist writer Arcangela Tarabotti, born Elena Cassandra. She practiced chiefly in Vicenza (her paintings at chiesa di San Silvestro were destroyed in 1944), where she painted historical pictures. She died in financial constraints at the Ospedaletto di San Giobbe in Venice on 8 February 1693, aged 78.

== Biography ==
The daughter of Stefano Bernardino of the late Marc'Antonio and of Maria Cadena, she was the penultimate and sixth daughter (out of 11 siblings, there were four boys and seven girls) of Stefano Bernardino (1574-1642) and Maria Cadena (1575?-1649). She was baptised at San Pietro in Castello parish church, in the borough of Castello, in Venice, on 15 June 1615.

In 1617 she moved with her family to live near San Nicolò dei Tolentini, borough of Santa Croce, at the other edge of Venice, where her father run a manufacture of sublimates.

There is no documentary evidence of her training as a painter at least in her family papers. However, painter Alessandro Varotari appears among the best men at her older sister Lorenzina's wedding with Giacomo Pighetti, on 21 February 1640, when Caterina was then aged 25.

She remained single, since her family could not afford to pay a marital dowry for her, after having provider one also for her youngest sister Innocenza. In 1647, aged 30, went living together with her sister Angela, a spinster aged 40, at some relative's place in Venice, as a lodger. In her will, written in the same year, her mother Maria nee Cadena left her the yearly income of 60 ducats, which would be the amount required to enter a convent as a nun.

As a matter of fact, both Caterina and Angela Tarabotti did enter eventually Corpus Domini nunnery in Vicenza, but they did not take the veil, staying as lodgers from 1 August 1648 onwards. Angela spent the rest of her life there, submitted to the law of strict enclosure without being a nun, and died there in 1685. Caterina left on 23 November 1650, moved back to Venice and spent a period in Sant'Anna in Castello nunnery, possibly as a volunteer nurse, before her sister, the protofeminist writer Suor Arcangela, died there on 22 February 1652.

In the following years, Caterina had to fight for her legal possessions against her brother Lorenzo (1610-1661) and his heirs. In 1674 she was living at Rio delle Chiovere, where her nephews Dario had rented her a flat at the symbolic price of 1 ducat per year, due to their debt with her of 850 ducats.

Sadly, in 1690, when writing her will, Caterina was living with her servant and heir at the Ospedaletto di San Giobbe in financial constraints. She left only a painting to her grand-niece Lorenzina Badoer nee Pighetti. She died on 8 February 1693, aged 78.

In her posthumous book, Simplicity Deceived, published in Leiden, by Elzevier in 1654, two years after her death, Arcangela Tarabotti possibly writes about her sister Caterina - without overtly naming her -, when stating:

"Let the proof be a young woman closely related to me, gifted with abundant wit and talents. In no time she reached the point of competing with Apollo in music and poetry, with Apelles in painting, with Minerva in learning, and with Nature herself in sculpting small animals so realistically that, but the fact they do not move or fly away, you would think they were alive".

However, this passage does not appear in the manuscript version of "Tirannia paterna" (the previous title of "Semplicità ingannata"), now uncovered by Francesca Medioli. Hence, there is the strong doubt that it was Caterina herself adding such an enthusiastic statement about her multi-purpose capacities (there is no evidence about any musical talent of hers, for instance). If not CAterina, it could have been the editor of "Simplicity Deceived", the French ex Huguenot, astronomer and acquaintance Ismael Boulliau, to add such a clause, perhaps out of gratitude, in case she had funded her late sister's publication.

In 1660 Marco Boschini listed Caterina Tarabotti among the great Venetian painters of his days, opposite to Lanzi (Dizionario biografico delle donne illustri, Milan, Bettoni, 1822, vol. III, p. 171). She appears among the Venetian artists in Quinto catalogo de gli pittori di nome che al presente vivono in Venetia, in Venetia città nobilissima et singolare descritta in XIV libri da M. Francesco Sansovino (Venice, Stefano Curti, 1663, p. 23).

A church in Vicenza, San Silvestro, with some frescoes on the ceiling by Caterina went destroyed during Second World War. Caterina' will lists two paintings of hers only. No certain attribution of any is currently available.
