= Latin Bishopric of Argos =

The Latin Bishopric of Argos (Latin: Dioecesis Argolicensis, lit. "Argolic Diocese"; also Latin: Dioecesis Argo and Latin: Dioecesis Argivensis — "Argo Diocese" and "Argive Diocese") is a former Latin Church episcopal see in the Argolid in southern Greece, formed with the establishment of the Crusader States, and suffragan to the Latin Archbishop of Corinth. For part of its history it totally supplanted the local Greek Orthodox episcopal administration (the mediaeval Metropolis of Argos and Nauplia, now called the Metropolis of Argolis) and at other times existed in competition with it. At various times in its history it had no incumbent bishop. It was finally suppressed in 1715 and exists now as a Catholic titular see.

== Frankish rule ==
Under Frankish Crusader rule, Argos was part of the Lordship of Argos and Nauplia, and became a Latin Church bishopric in 1212. It lasted as a residential see until Argos was taken by the Ottoman Empire in 1463, but would be revived under the second Venetian rule in 1686. In the meantime, the Venetians retained Nauplia until 1540, when it was lost in the Third Ottoman Venetian War. Until then, at least some of the nominal bishops of Argos resided at Nauplia; afterwards in Venice. The Orthodox bishop returned to Argos during this interval.

Known Latin bishops during this period were:;;

1. John
2. Bernard
3. Nicholas (30 April 1311)
4. Nicholas, Augustinian Order (O.E.S.A.) (1324.12.17 – ?), previously Bishop of Roman Catholic Diocese of Drivasto (1323.02.28 – 1324.12.17)
5. John (4 Sept 1334)
6. Ventur(in)us
7. Nicholas of Offida, Friars Minor (O.F.M.) (1358.12.10 – ?), previously Bishop of Butrinto (? – 1349.06.15), Bishop of Belcastro (1349.06.15 – 1358.12.10)
8. James Petri (Pigalordi)
9. Matthew
10. Nicholas of Langres
11. John
12. Conrad Flader
13. Secundus Nani
14. Francesco Pavoni (1425.05.14 – ?), previously Bishop of Kotor (Montenegro) (1422.10.02 – 1434)
15. Bartholemew
16. Mark de Carmello
17. Mark Taruello
18. William Militis
19. Augustine, abbot of the Monastery of Saint Leonard, from 1499 coadjutor with right of succession with Tryphon Gabriel
20. Tryphon Gabriel (14 January 1499, - ?)
21. Paul Zabarella (20 March 1504 - ?)
22. John, (7 November 1509 - ?) Dubious, it is possible that he should be listed as titular only
23. Francis Tynemouth (1512)
24. Jermoe de Sanctis (1513)
25. Calixtus de Amadeis (20 April 1514) Doctor of both laws
26. James Rota (10 April 1540) Suffragan to Padua; non-resident
27. Gerard Busdragi (24 August 1552)
28. Jerome William (7 March 1563) Suffragan to Padua; present at the Council of Trent)
29. Leander Garuffi (Rotelli) de Piis (15 January 1574) Was permitted by Pope Paul IV to be coadjutor with his brother, it is disputed whether he held a doctorate

== Venetian Rule ==
There was a Catholic church hierarchy in Argos and Nauplia at this time, which compelled the Greek Orthodox Metropolis of Argos and Nauplia to relocate to the village of Merbaka, further east.

1. ? (1686- ?)

== Titular see ==
Today, Argos is listed by the Catholic Church as a titular see since the diocese was nominally restored as a Latin Catholic titular bishopric in the 17th century. It has been vacant for decades, having had the following incumbents, all of the fitting episcopal (lowest) rank :

1. Stanisław Udrzycki (1617.12.04 – 1621.10)
2. Louis du Chaine (1618.04.02 – 1623.02)
3. Franciszek Zajerski (1622.02.21 – 1631)
4. Stanisław Łoza (1634.06.12 – 1639)
5. Mikołaj Krasicki (1639.10.03 – 1652)
6. Maciej Bystram (1659.09.22 – 1677.08.05)
7. Bernardino della Chiesa (伊大仁), Friars Minor (O.F.M.), Chinese missionary (1680.03.20 – 1690.04.10)
8. Polikarp Antoni Augustyn Marciejewski (1819.06.04 – 1827.10.19)
9. Bernardo Antonio De Riso, Benedictines (O.S.B.) (1883.08.09 – 1883.08.23)
10. Francesco Benassi (1884.11.10 – 1892.03.15)
11. Joaquim Arcoverde de Albuquerque Cavalcanti (1892.08.26 – 1894.08.19) (later Cardinal)
12. Antonio Valbonesi (1899.06.05 – 1901.04.15)
13. António Moutinho (1901.08.18 – 1904.11.14)
14. Andrea Caron (1905.08.25 – 1908.01.08) (later Archbishop)
15. Amando Agostino Bahlmann, O.F.M. (1908.07.10 – 1939.03.05)
16. Oreste Rauzi (1939.06.17 – 1973.02.02)
17. Bernardo Gerardo Hilhorst, Holy Ghost Fathers (C.S.Sp.) (1953.12.12 – 1954.08.11)
18. Johann Aloys Schneider (1801.01.29 – 1818.12.22)
