= Latin Patriarchate of Constantinople =

Position in the Catholic Church (1204–1964)

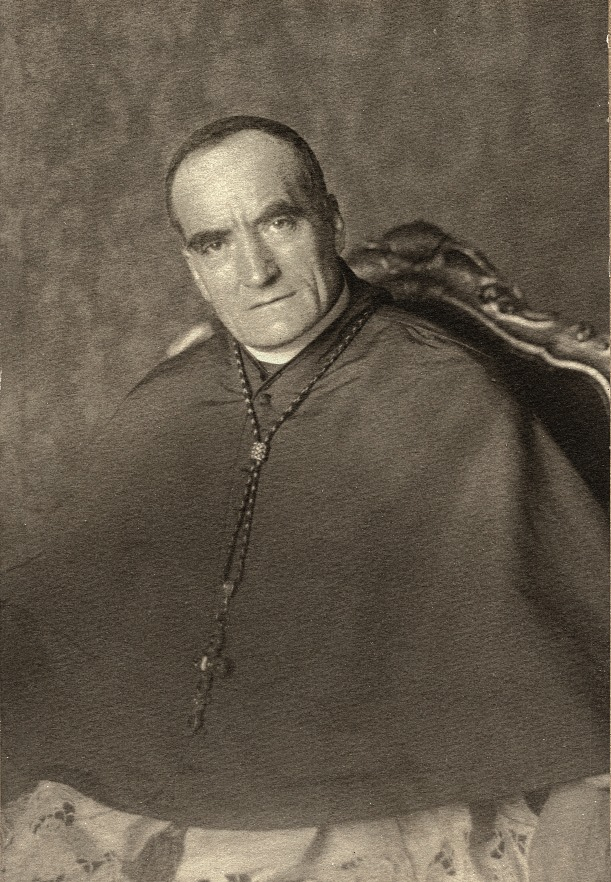
Antonio Anastasio Rossi, last Latin Patriarch of Constantinople (d. 1948)

The Latin Patriarchate of Constantinople was an office established as a result of the Fourth Crusade and its conquest of Constantinople in 1204. It was a Catholic replacement for the Eastern Orthodox Ecumenical Patriarchate of Constantinople and remained in the city until the reconquest of Constantinople by the Byzantines in 1261, whereupon it became a titular see with only ceremonial powers. St. Peter's Basilica was the patriarchium, or papal major basilica assigned to the patriarch of Constantinople, where he officiated when visiting Rome. The office was abolished in 1964.

== History ==
In the early middle ages, there were five patriarchs in the Christian world. In descending order of precedence: Rome by the bishop of Rome (who rarely used the title "patriarch") and those of Constantinople, Alexandria, Antioch, and Jerusalem.

The sees of Rome and Constantinople were often at odds with one another, just as the Greek and Latin Churches as a whole were often at odds both politically and in things ecclesiastical. There were complex cultural currents underlying these difficulties. The tensions led in 1054 to a serious rupture between the Greek East and Latin West called the East–West Schism, which while not in many places absolute, still dominates the ecclesiastical landscape.

In 1204, the Fourth Crusade invaded, seized and sacked Constantinople, and established the Latin Empire. Pope Innocent III, who was not involved, initially spoke out against the Crusade, writing in a letter to his legate, "How, indeed, is the Greek church to be brought back into ecclesiastical union and to a devotion for the Apostolic See when she has been beset with so many afflictions and persecutions that she sees in the Latins only an example of perdition and the works of darkness, so that she now, and with reason, detests the Latins more than dogs?" However the popes accepted the Latin patriarchate established by Catholic clergy that accompanied the Crusade, similar to Latin patriarchates previously established in the Crusader states of the Holy Land. The pope recognised these "Latin" sees at the Fourth Council of the Lateran. Furthermore, those Orthodox bishops left in their place were made to swear an oath of allegiance to the pope.

However, the Latin Empire in Constantinople was eventually defeated and dispossessed by a resurgent Byzantium in 1261. Since that time Latin Patriarch Pantaleone Giustinian (d. 1286) resided in the West, though continuing to oversee the remaining Latin Catholic dioceses in various parts of Latin Greece. The continuing threat of a Catholic Crusade to restore the Latin Empire, championed by the ambitious Charles I of Anjou, led to the first attempts, on the Byzantine side, to effect a Union of the Churches. After the Union of Lyon (1274), John Bekkos was installed as a Greek Catholic Patriarch of Constantinople in 1275, but that did not affect the position of Pantaleone Giustinian. His Greek Catholic counterpart was deposed in 1282 by Eastern Orthodox hierarchy, thus ending a short-lived union. in 1286, Latin Patriarch Pantaleone Giustinian was succeeded by Pietro Correr who was the first holder of that office in a new form of a titular see.

On 8 February 1314, Pope Clement V united the Patriarchate with the episcopal see of Negroponte (Chalcis), hitherto a suffragan of the Latin Archbishopric of Athens, so that the patriarchs could once more have a territorial diocese on Greek soil and exercise a direct role as the head of the Latin clergy in what remained of Latin Greece.

For a time, like many ecclesiastical offices in the West, it had rival contenders who were supporters or protégés of the rival popes. As to the title Latin Patriarch of Constantinople, this was the case at least from 1378 to 1423. Thereafter the office continued as an honorific title, during the later centuries attributed to a leading clergyman in Rome, until it ceased to be assigned after 1948 and in January 1964, along with the titles of the Latin Patriarchate of Alexandria and Antioch, it was no longer mentioned in the Vatican yearbook (rather than being announced as being abolished). This was after Pope Paul VI met with Ecumenical Patriarch Athenagoras I of Constantinople (see Pope Paul VI and ecumenism), showing the Latin Church by this point was more interested in reconciliation with the Eastern Church, abolishing the titular title.

A Vicariate Apostolic of Istanbul (until 1990, Constantinople) has existed from 1742 into the present day.

== List of Latin patriarchs of Constantinople ==
- Tommaso Morosini (1204–1211)
  - Vacant (1211–1215)
- Gervasio (1215–1219)
  - Vacant (1219–1221)
- Matteo (1221–1226)
- Jean Halgrin (1226), declined office
- Simon of Maugastel (1227–1233)
  - Vacant (1233–1234)
- Niccolò Visconti da Castro Arquato (1234–1251)
  - Vacant (1251–1253)
- Pantaleone Giustinian (1253–1286); After 1261, resided in the West
- Pietro Correr (1286–1302)
- Leonardo Faliero (1302–c. 1305)
- Nicholas of Thebes (c. 1308–c. 1335), later cardinal (1332–1335)
- Gozzio Battaglia (1335–1339)
- Rolando d'Asti (1339) (died immediately)
- Enrico d'Asti (1339–1345), bishop of Negroponte
- Stephen of Pinu (1346)
- William (1346–1364)
- Pierre Thomas (1364–1366)
- Paul (1366–1370)
- Ugolino Malabranca de Orvieto (1371–c. 1375), bishop of Rimini
- Giacomo da Itri (1376–1378), archbishop of Otranto
- Paul Palaiologos Tagaris (1379/80–1384)
  - Vacant (1384–1390)
- Angelo Correr (1390–1405), later Pope Gregory XII
- Louis of Mytilene (Ludovico? Luiz?) (1406–1408)
- Antonio Correr (1408)
- Alfonso of Seville (1408)
- Francesco Lando (1409), patriarch of Grado
- Giovanni Contarini (1409–c. 1412)
- Jean de la Rochetaillée (1412–1423)
- Giovanni Contarini (1424–1430?), restored
- François de Conzié (1430–1432)
  - Vacant (1432–1438)
- Francesco Condulmer (1438–1453)
- Gregory Mammas (1453–1458), formerly Orthodox Patriarch of Constantinople as Gregory III
- Isidore of Kiev (1458–1462)
- Bessarion (1463–1472)
- Pietro Riario (1472–1474)
- Girolamo Lando (1474–c. 1496), Archbishop of Crete
- Giovanni Michiel (1497–1503) Bishop of Verona, later Cardinal
- Juan de Borja Lanzol de Romaní, el mayor (1503)
- Francisco Galcerán de Lloris y de Borja (1503–1506)
- Marco Cornaro (1506–1507)
- Tamás Bakócz (1507–1521)
- Marco Cornaro (1521–1524), restored
- Giles of Viterbo (1524–1530), Cardinal bishop of Viterbo
- Francesco Pesaro (1530–1545) Archbishop of Zadar
- Marino Grimani (1545–1546)
- Ranuccio Farnese (1546–1550)
- Fabio Colonna (1550–1554), bishop of Aversa
- Ranuccio Farnese (1554–1565) restored
- Scipione Rebiba (1565–1573) Cardinal bishop of Albano
- Prospero Rebiba (1573–1593) Bishop of Troia
- Silvio Savelli (cardinal) (1594–1596)
- Ercole Tassoni (1596–1597)
- Bonifazio Bevilacqua Aldobrandini (1598–1627?)
- Bonaventura Secusio (1599–1618)
- Ascanio Gesualdo (1618–1638)
- Francesco Maria Macchiavelli (1640–1641)
- Giovanni Giacomo Panciroli (1641–1643)
- Giovanni Battista Spada (1643–1675?)
- Volumnio Bandinelli (1658–1660), later Cardinal
- Stefano Ugolini (1667–1681)
- Odoardo Cibo (Cybo) (1689–1706?), titular archbishop of Seleucia in Isauria
- Luigi Pico della Mirandola (1706–1712)
- Andrea Riggio (1716–1717)
- Camillo Cibo (Cybo) (1718–1729)
- Mondillo Orsini (1729–1751)
- Ferdinando Maria de Rossi (1751–1759)
- Filippo Caucci (1760–1771)
- Juan Portugal de la Puebla (1771–1781), later cardinal
- Francesco Antonio Marcucci (1781–1798)
- Benedetto Fenaja (1805–1823)
- Giuseppe della Porta Rodiani (1823–1835)
- Cardinal Giovanni Soglia Ceroni (1835–1839)
- Antonio Maria Traversi (1839–1842)
- Giovanni Giacomo Sinibaldi (1843)
- Cardinal Fabio Maria Asquini (1844–1845)
- Giovanni Giuseppe Canali (1845–1851)
- Domenico Lucciardi (1851–1860)
- Giuseppe Melchiade Ferlisi (1860–1865)
- Ruggero Luigi Emidio Antici Mattei (1866–1878)
- Giacomo Gallo (1878–1881)
  - Vacant (1881–1887)
- Giulio Lenti (1887–1895)
- Cardinal Giovanni Battista Casali del Drago (1895–1899)
- Cardinal Alessandro Sanminiatelli Zabarella (1899–1901)
- Cardinal Carlo Nocella (1901–1903), died 1908, former Latin Patriarch of Antioch
- Giuseppe Ceppetelli (1903–1917)
  - Vacant (1917–1923)
- Michele Zezza di Zapponeta (1923–1927)
- Antonio Anastasio Rossi (1927–1948)
- Vacancy from 1948 until the Latin titular patriarchate was abolished in 1964.

== See also ==
- List of popes
- Latin Patriarch of Alexandria
- Latin Patriarch of Antioch
- Latin Patriarch of Jerusalem
- Latin Archbishop of Athens
- Latin Archbishop of Corinth
- Latin Archbishop of Crete
- Latin Archbishop of Neopatras
- Latin Archbishop of Patras
- Latin Archbishop of Thebes

== Sources and external links ==
- Giorgio Fedalto, La Chiesa latina in Oriente, Mazziana, Verona, 2nd ed. 1981, e vol.
- Loenertz, R.-J. (1966). "Cardinale Morosini et Paul Paléologue Tagaris, patriarches, et Antoine Ballester, vicaire du Papae, dans le patriarcat de Constantinople (1332-34 et 1380-87)". Revue des études byzantines (in French). 24: 224–256. doi:10.3406/rebyz.1966.1373.
- Wolff, Robert Lee (1948). "The Organization of the Latin Patriarchate of Constantinople, 1204–1261: Social and Administrative Consequences of the Latin Conquest". Traditio. VI. Cambridge University Press: 33–60. doi:10.1017/S0362152900004359. JSTOR 27830170. S2CID 151901021.
- Wolff, Robert Lee (1954). "Politics in the Latin Patriarchate of Constantinople, 1204–1261". Dumbarton Oaks Papers. 8. Dumbarton Oaks: 225–303. doi:10.2307/1291068. JSTOR 1291068.
- List of Latin Patriarchs of Constantinople by GCatholic.org
- Catholic Hierarchy
