= Giovanni Migliorati (cardinal) =

Italian Cardinal

- Cardinal-Priest of Santa Croce in Gerusalemme
- Church: Catholic Church
- See: Santa Croce in Gerusalemme
- In office: 12 June 1405 – 16 October 1410
- Predecessor: Cosimo de' Migliorati
- Successor: Francesco Lando
- Other post: Administrator of Ravenna (1405-1410)
- Previous post: Archbishop of Ravenna (1400-1405)

Orders
- Consecration: 11 December 1401 by Bartolomeo Raimondi
- Created cardinal: 12 June 1405 by Pope Innocent VII

Personal details
- Born: Giovanni Niccolò delle Caselle Migliorati
- Died: 16 October 1410

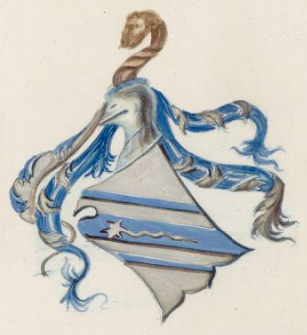
Coat of arms of Cardinal Migliorati

Giovanni Niccolò delle Caselle Migliorati (died in 16 October 1410) was an Italian Cardinal. From 12 June 1405; he was Archbishop of Ravenna from 1400 to 1405. From 1405 he was Administrator of the same Archdiocese.
