= Arcangela Tarabotti =

Venetian nun and writer (1604–1652)

Arcangela Tarabotti (baptized 24 February 1604 – died 28 February 1652) was a Venetian nun and Early Modern Italian writer. Tarabotti wrote texts and corresponded with cultural and political figures for most of her adult life, centering on the issues of forced enclosure, and what she saw as other symptoms and systems of patriarchy and misogyny in her works and discussions. Tarabotti wrote at least seven works, though only five were published during her lifetime. Because of the politics of Tarabotti’s works, many scholars consider her “a protofeminist writer as well as an early political theorist.”

== Early life and enclosure ==
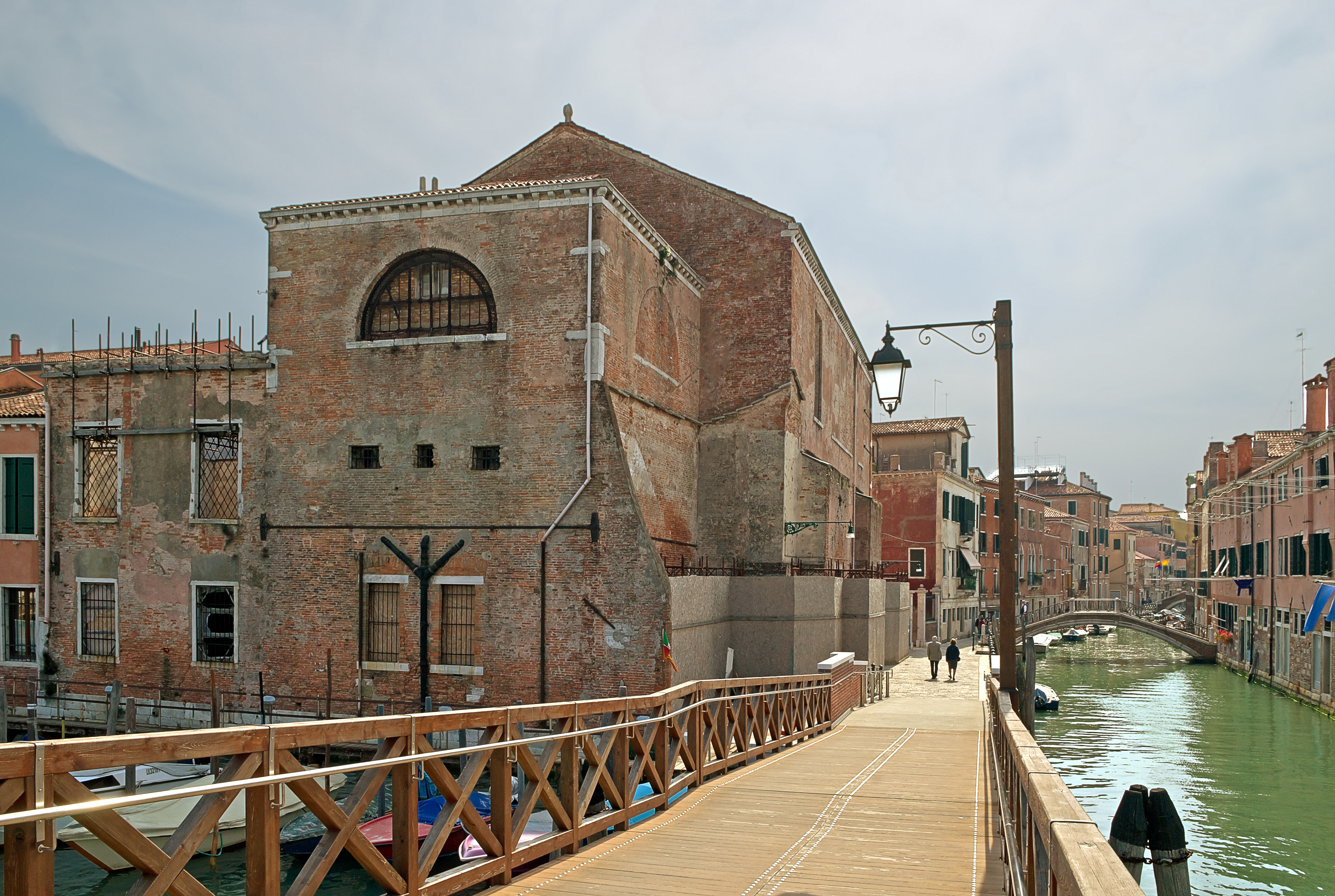
Sant'Anna Convent in Venice

Sister Arcangela Tarabotti was born Elena Cassandra Tarabotti in Castello, Venice. Her parents were Stefano Tarabotti and Maria Cadena. Tarabotti was one of eleven children and the eldest of seven daughters. Tarabotti, like her father, was lame, which might have convinced her father she was "unmarriageable." One of her siblings was going to become the painter Caterina Tarabotti. According to her, at the age of 11 (in 1615), Tarabotti was sent as a boarder to the Benedictine convent of Sant’Anna, but the convent papers state her presence only from 1617 onwards. Such monachization—especially of daughters deemed “unmarriageable”—was common in Early Modern Italy; this practice, especially when forced or coerced, formed the thematic center of her critical works. The Church di Sant'Anna still stands in the Castello district of Venice, although the inside of the building is currently inaccessible, while the cloister is now accessible.

In 1620, Tarabotti took her first vows (the dressing) and, in 1623, she took her final vows, the solemn profession. At least during her earlier years in the cloister, Tarabotti admitted to have been rebellious and outspoken; Tarabotti tells she wore the religious habit in a worldly way or did not cut her hair until directly ordered to do so by Catholic Cardinal and Patriarch of Venice, Federico Baldissera Bartolomeo Corner or Cornaro. Her beliefs, however, remained unchanged; Tarabotti wrote in her autobiography, explaining that "He made me amend my vanities. I cut off my hair, but I did not uproot my emotions. I reformed my life, but my thoughts flourish rampantly, and just like my shorn hair, grow all the more." Indeed, though Tarabotti remained less outwardly rebellious after this time, she wrote that, by living as a nun, she was "living a lie."

Nuns at this time lived under strict enclosure and separately from lay society, and were prohibited by Canon Law from interacting with people outside of the cloister. Enclosed as she was, Tarabotti managed to educate herself, reading and writing a great deal of prohibited books during her years in the convent; not only that, Tarabotti also managed to circulate her works among peers through correspondence, and appears to have had many visits from outsiders—all of which contact and correspondence were in direct disobedience of Church officials.

During her time in the cloister, Tarabotti appears to have educated herself and created an impressive network of correspondents, including various writers, scientists, and political figures. Tarabotti used this network to engage in critical political and literary discourse with cultural and political figures, and to help in the editing and publishing of four texts during her lifetime (and the fifth, "Semplicità ingannata", two years after her death). Though sometimes cloistered women had opportunities to educate themselves and sometimes had access to books and writing materials, Tarabotti's level of education seemed unique even among this group of women—indeed, some historians have remarked that while her handwriting was not "well above average.", her culture and skills were. Most unusual though, may have been Tarabotti's radical politics and connections to influential literary and political communities.

Her works incorporate a profound critique of the Catholic Church's increasing limitation treatment of its female agents in the 17th century. She particularly highlights the role of education and the disparities between male and female opportunities for schooling. Her argumentation remains thoroughly grounded in biblical evidence, highlighting the prominence of female disciples in Jesus Christ's following given the patriarchal context of first-century Judaism, and consequently arguing that women should have a more significant role in the contemporary church and world.

== Correspondence and peers ==
Some historians argue that Tarabotti's published Letters reveal a "wide-ranging and powerful set of correspondents that included leading cultural and political figures from throughout Northern Italy and into France." Indeed, Tarabotti corresponded with a range of people, from subversive scientists to well known writers. Tarabotti was the only woman writer in Venice ever documented to have a relationship and correspondences with—as well as enjoy the patronage of—Giovanni Francesco Loredan, founder of the Incogniti literary society, and boasts in her Letters of correspondence with many other members of the Venetian elite. Tarabotti also corresponded and exchanged her work with Francesco Pona, a subversive author of various erotic novels and deliberately anticlerical works; with Father Angelico Aprosio, an elite scholar from Ventimiglia; with a "fugitive Carthusian monk" whose works also criticized forced monachization and mistreatment of women in the cloister; with Giovanni Francesco Busenello, a successful Italian lawyer, a prolific poet, and an acclaimed librettist; and with Count Pier Paolo Bissari of Vicenza, another writer whose works range from prose, to poetry, to libretti. Possibly after Tarabotti's Letters was published, she began a correspondence with Ismaël Bullialdus, a prominent astronomer and mathematician, whom she had met when he was in Venice visiting the French Ambassador and his wife in 1645-1646.

Her letters situate Tarabotti within a community of writers, scientists, and political and cultural figures, in which she was one of few women. Her published correspondence documents her efforts to circulate her works and disseminate her political messages. In the case of Paternal Tyranny, which a number of historians consider her most significant and politically subversive work, the letters record repeated requests for patronage and editorial assistance, many of which were unsuccessful.

The correspondence between Tarabotti and Ismaël Bullialdus was the avenue of publishing for Tarabotti's works La tirannia paterna.La semplicita` ingannata, otherwise known as Paternal Tyranny or Innocent Deceived was published in 1654 posthumously. Tarabotti and Bullialdus' correspondence broadens our understanding of social notions of the time including female participation and male-female collaboration. The correspondence also strengthens our view of Ismaël Bullialdus, who was an avid defender of Galileo and an advocate for scientific truths, but also displays social activism in helping Tarabotti to publish her works which would disseminate word of injustice involving the patriarchal system, which lead to her forced indoctrination into the church.

== Writing and politics ==
Tarabotti's candid critiques of women's forced monachization, misogyny, and various elements of patriarchal systems distinguished her as a notable political author. The content of Tarabotti's writing was not only distinctive, but her writing style was also exceptional—Tarabotti combined autobiography, fictional narrative, literary analysis, political declaration, invective, and interpretation to produce compelling works that promoted a thought-provoking protofeminist agenda..

Paternal Tyranny, considered Tarabotti's most prized work, lays bare her radical politics. Lynn Lara Westwater, a historian who has researched and written much on Tarabotti’s life and works calls Paternal Tyranny "scathing and deeply subversive." Paternal Tyranny was indeed subversive, and was received as such: in 1654, the year it was published, the Congregation of the Index attempted to get it placed on the Index of Prohibited Books —and, thus, effectively banned. Paternal Tyranny was eventually placed on the Index in 1661.

From "With Truthful Tongue and Faithful Pen": Arcangela Tarabotti Against Paternal Tyranny" by Elissa B. Weaver

She did not spare fathers, nor the Venetian state that quietly supported the practice in order to limit the size of the aristocracy, nor the Church, which officially condemned it, but remained silently complicit, unwilling to uphold its principles and defend the exercise of free will. Tarabotti's complaint did not remain a personal one. She understood that misogyny was the source of her oppression and that all women were its victims, and she spent her life defending women and exposing the illogic of arguments for their inferiority and suppression. Through her writing and her forceful personality Arcangela Tarabotti made connections in the literary and publishing world of Venice and beyond, and despite being an enclosed nun she was able to publish her work. She could not let the misogynist behavior of men stand without response: she wrote that "he who stings must be stung."

Paternal Tyranny is organized into three sections or "books", the unifying theme of which is the structures of power—from state and governmental hierarchies, to hierarchies within the church, to gender hierarchies—that ensure the subjugation of women, especially through forcing women into the cloister and denying them sufficient education. In Paternal Tyranny, Tarabotti critiques misogynistic narratives in popular European writings, supporting her pro-women messages with texts such as the Bible, Dante’s Divine Comedy, and the works of other Venetian women writers like Lucrezia Marinella. All in all, the text combats what its title asserts: male tyranny.

== Legacy ==
Arcangela Tarabotti has slowly carved out her importance in history, specifically in the history of protofeminism, since her rediscovery in the late 1930s by Benedetto Croce, Giuseppe Portigliotti, and Emilio Zanette. In recent years, many studies and critical works have been published on Tarabotti whose authors have consisted of Elissa Weaver, Lynn Westwater and Meredith Ray, Francesca Medioli and Letizia Panizza.

== Works ==
The following is a list of Tarabotti’s published works (in chronological date of publication).

- Paradiso monacale or The Monastic Paradise (published 1643).
- Antisatira or Antisatire (pub. 1644), an anonymous response to Francesco Buoninsegni’s *Contro ‘l lusso donnesco satira menippea (1638).
- Lettere familiari e di complimento or Letters (pub. 1650).
- Le Lagrime D'Arcangela Tarabotti or Arcangela Tarabotti's Tears (pub. 1650).
- Che le donne siano della specie degli uomini Difesa delle donne or That Women are of the Human Race. Defense of Women (pub. 1651 under the pseudonym of Galerana Barcitotti), a response to the anonymous tract Che le donne non siano della spezie degli uomini. Discorso piacevole or Women Do Not Belong to the Species Mankind. An Amusing Speech (1647).
- Semplicità ingannata (pub. posthumously in 1654 under the pseudonym of Galerana Baratotti, after changing its title from Tirannia paterna).
- L’inferno monacale or Convent Life as Inferno (pub. posthumously in 1990, transcribed and edited by Francesca Medioli, new revised edition 2024).
