= Pietro Correr (politician) =

Italian politician and diplomat

Pietro Correr (18 June 1707 – 4 September 1768) was an Italian politician and diplomat. Born in Venice, he belonged to the Correr family and held several government roles in the Republic of Venice, for example its ambassador to the Habsburg monarchy and the Papal States. He also worked in Constantinople, where he guided the work of the scientist Ruggero Boscovich. He died in Venice.
