= Dario Varotari the Younger =

Italian painter

Dario Varotari the Younger (active 1660) was an Italian painter, engraver, and poet of the Baroque.

He was born in Padua, the son of the painter Alessandro Varotari, and grandson of Dario Varotari the Elder. He was popular as a portrait painter.
