= Pope Gregory XII =

Head of the Catholic Church from 1406 to 1415

- Bishop of Rome
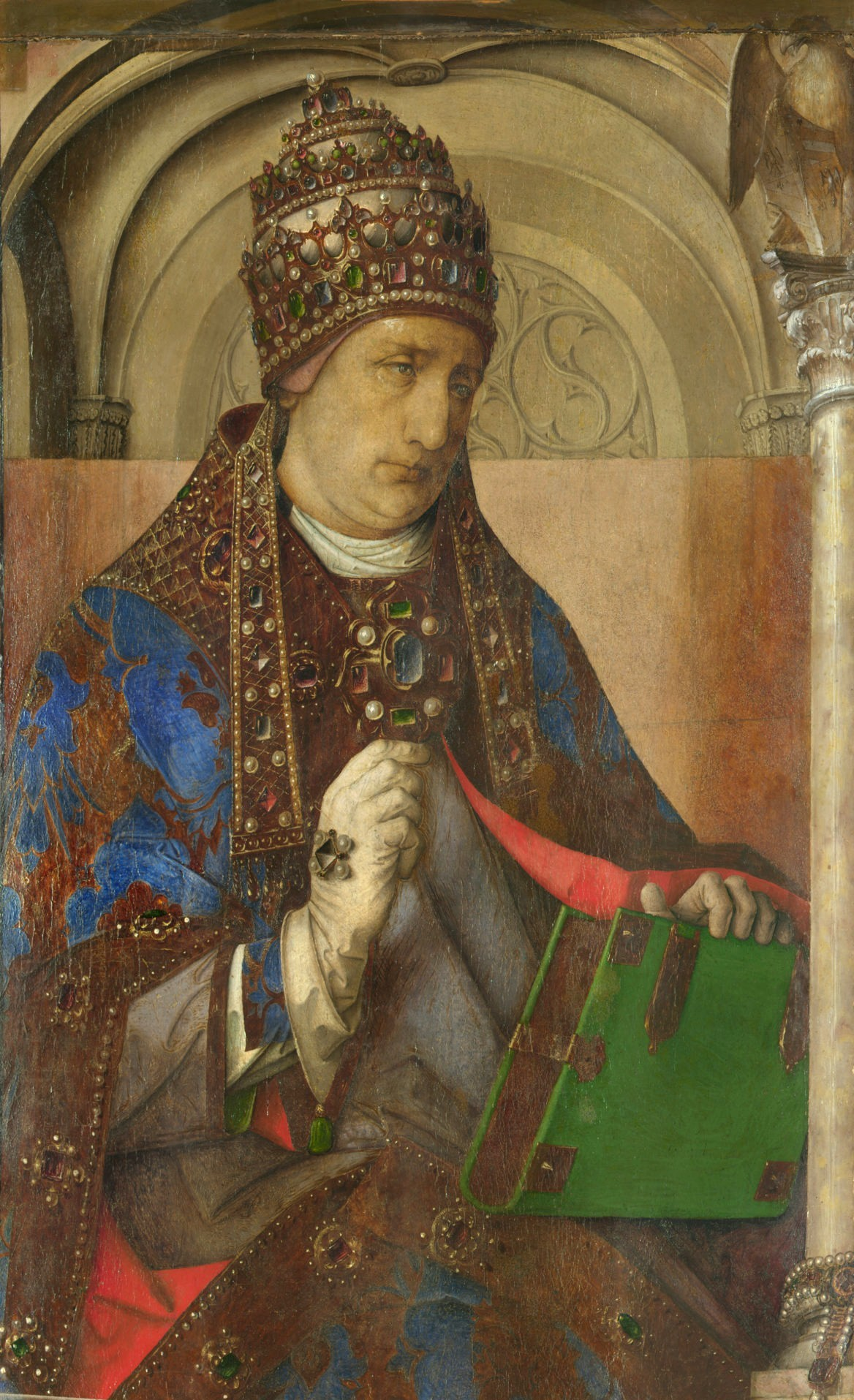
- Portrait of Gregory XII as Gregory I by van Gent and Berruguete (c. 1476, Ducal Palace, Urbino)
- Church: Catholic Church
- Papacy began: 30 November 1406
- Papacy ended: 4 July 1415
- Predecessor: Innocent VII
- Successor: Martin V
- Opposed to: Avignon claimant: Benedict XIII; Pisan claimants: Alexander V; John XXIII
- Previous posts: Bishop of Castello (1380–1390); Bishop of the Island of Negrepont (1387–1390); Titular Patriarch of Constantinople (1390–1405); Cardinal-Priest of San Marco (1405–1406); Bishop of Macerata-Tolentino (1415–1417); Apostolic Administrator of Constantinople (1406–1409); Cardinal-Bishop of Porto e Santa Rufina (1415–1417)

Orders
- Consecration: 1390
- Created cardinal: 12 June 1405 by Innocent VII

Personal details
- Born: Angelo Corraro (or Corario) c. 1327 Venice, Republic of Venice
- Died: 18 October 1417 (aged 89–90) Recanati, Marche, Papal States
- Coat of arms: Gregory XII's coat of arms

Papal styles of Pope Gregory XII
- Reference style: His Holiness
- Spoken style: Your Holiness
- Religious style: Holy Father
- Posthumous style: None

Pope Gregory XII (Latin: Gregorius XII; Italian: Gregorio XII; c. 1327 – 18 October 1417), born Angelo Corraro, Corario, or Correr, was head of the Catholic Church from 30 November 1406 to 4 July 1415. Reigning during the Western Schism, he was opposed by the Avignon claimant Benedict XIII and the Pisan claimants Alexander V and John XXIII. Gregory XII wanted to unify the Church and voluntarily resigned in 1415 to end the schism.

== Early life ==
Dietrich of Nieheim states that Angelo Corraro was about 80 years old when he became pope. Angelo Corraro was born in Venice of a noble family, about 1327, son of Niccolò di Pietro Correr and Polissena, and was appointed Bishop of Castello in 1380, succeeding Bishop Nicolò Morosini. He was uncle of cardinal Antonio Correr and cardinal Gabriele Condulmer, future Pope Eugene IV.

On 1 December 1390, he was made titular Latin Patriarch of Constantinople. On 12 June 1405, he was created cardinal and the Cardinal-Priest of San Marco by Pope Innocent VII. He was Apostolic Administrator of Constantinople from 30 November 1406 to 23 October 1409.

== Pontificate ==
Gregory XII was chosen at Rome on 30 November 1406 by a conclave consisting of only fifteen cardinals under the express condition that, should Antipope Benedict XIII (1394–1423), the rival papal claimant at Avignon, renounce all claim to the papacy, he would also renounce his, so that a fresh election might be made and the Western Schism (1378–1417) ended.

=== Negotiations to end the schism ===
The two claimants opened wary negotiations and met at a neutral location Savona in Liguria, but soon began to waver in their resolve. The Corraro relatives of Gregory XII in Venice and King Ladislaus of Naples, a supporter of Gregory XII and his predecessor for political reasons, used all their influence to prevent the meeting, and each claimant of the papal title feared being captured by partisans of his rival.

The cardinals of Gregory XII openly showed their dissatisfaction at this manoeuvring and gave signs of their intention to abandon him. On 4 May 1408, Gregory XII convened his cardinals at Lucca and ordered them not to leave the city under any pretext. He tried to supplement his following by creating four of his Corraro nephews cardinals – including the future Pope Eugene IV, despite his promise in the conclave that he would create no new cardinals. Seven of the cardinals secretly left Lucca and negotiated with the cardinals of Benedict XIII concerning the convocation of a general council by them, at which both Gregory XII and Benedict XIII should be declared deposed and a new pope elected. Consequently, they convoked the Council of Pisa and invited both claimants to be present. Neither Gregory XII nor Benedict XIII appeared.

Meanwhile, Gregory XII stayed in Rimini with the family of his loyal and powerful protector, the condottiero Carlo I Malatesta. Malatesta went to Pisa in person during the process of the council to support Gregory XII. At the fifteenth session, 5 June 1409, the Council of Pisa declared that it deposed both Gregory and Benedict as schismatical, heretical, perjured, and scandalous; they pronounced that they had elected Alexander V (1409–10) later that month. Gregory XII, who had meanwhile created ten more cardinals, had convoked a rival council at Cividale del Friuli, near Aquileia; but only a few bishops appeared. Gregory XII's cardinals pronounced Benedict XIII and Alexander V schismatics, perjurers, and devastators of the Church, but their pronouncement went unheeded. Gregory XII was very saddened by the way he was treated; he also had some adventures while barely escaping from enemies and former friends.

=== Resolution of the schism ===
The Council of Constance finally resolved the situation. Gregory XII appointed Carlo Malatesta and Cardinal Giovanni Dominici of Ragusa as his proxies. The cardinal then convoked the council and authorized its succeeding acts, thus preserving the formulas of papal supremacy.

Thereupon on 4 July 1415, Gregory XII's resignation was pronounced in his name by Malatesta and accepted by the cardinals. As they had agreed previously, they retained all the cardinals created by Gregory XII, thus satisfying the Corraro clan, and appointed Gregory XII Bishop of Frascati, Dean of the College of Cardinals and perpetual legate at Ancona. The Council then set aside Antipope John XXIII (1410–15), the successor of Alexander V. After the former follower of Benedict XIII appeared, the council declared him deposed, ending the Western Schism. A new Roman pontiff, Martin V, was elected after the death of Gregory XII, which many took as an indication that Gregory had been the true pope. Therefore, the papacy was vacant for two years.

== Retirement and death ==
The rest of the life of the former pope was spent in peaceful obscurity in Ancona. He was the last pope to resign until Benedict XVI did so on 28 February 2013, almost 600 years later.

The Council of Constance appointed him Cardinal Bishop of Porto and perpetual legate of the March of Ancona for life. He died at Recanati on October 18, 1417.

== Historiography ==
The Annuario Pontificio has historically recognized the decisions of the Council of Pisa (1409). Until the mid-20th century, the Annuario Pontificio listed Gregory XII's reign as 1406–1409, followed by Alexander V (1409–1410) and John XXIII (1410–1415). However, the Western Schism was reinterpreted when Pope John XXIII (1958–1963) chose to reuse the ordinal XXIII, citing "twenty-two Johns of indisputable legitimacy". This is reflected in modern editions of the Annuario Pontificio, which extend Gregory XII's reign to 1415. Alexander V and the first John XXIII are now considered to be antipopes.

== See also ==
- Cardinals created by Gregory XII
- Papal resignation

Catholic Church titles
Vacant Title last held by Paul Palaiologos Tagaris	— TITULAR — Latin Patriarch of Constantinople; 1390–1405	Succeeded by Louis of Mytilene
Preceded by Innocent VII	Pope; 30 November 1406 – 4 July 1415; Avignon claimant: Benedict XIII; Pisan claimants: Alexander V & John XXIII	Succeeded by Martin V
