= Latin Archbishopric of Corinth =

Ecclesiastical Barony of the Principality of Achaea

The Latin Archbishopric of Corinth is a titular see of the Latin Church. It dates to 1210, when a Catholic archbishop was installed on the Orthodox Metropolis of Corinth, in Southern Greece, in the aftermath of the Fourth Crusade. Since the Byzantine reconquest in the early 15th century, and except for a brief period of Venetian rule in 1688–1715, it has been awarded as a titular see. It has been vacant since 2005.

== History ==
The See of Corinth has a long history, and is held to have been founded by the Apostle Paul. In the Roman and early Byzantine periods, Corinth was the capital and metropolitan see of the province of Achaea (southern Greece). From the early 9th century, however, the primacy of Corinth over the Peloponnese was challenged by the See of Patras, and from the 10th century on the jurisdiction of the See of Corinth was restricted to the eastern Peloponnese and certain of the Ionian Islands.

In 1203/4, the city fell to the lord of the Argolid, Leo Sgouros, who used the weakness of the Byzantine government and the turmoil of the Fourth Crusade to carve out for himself a practically independent state in southern and central Greece. Sgouros' ambitions to create a state of his own were checked by the onslaught of the victorious Crusaders, who captured Corinth in 1210 after a long siege.

The Crusaders established a Roman Catholic ("Latin") Archbishopric to replace the Greek Orthodox see, covering the same territory: the seven suffragan sees of Cephalonia, Zakynthos, Damala, Lacedaemon/Monemvasia, Argos, Helos and Zemena. In reality, Monemvasia and Helos were not to come under Latin control until thirty years later, and the Latin clergy had difficulty imposing itself on the rural Greek population and priesthood. As a result, the sees of Damala, Helos and Zemena seem to have never been occupied, and Zemena and one half of Damala came to form part of the diocese of Corinth itself. Along with its rival, the Latin Archbishop of Patras, the Archbishop of Corinth ranked as one of the two senior ecclesiastic barons in the Principality of Achaea, with eight knight's fiefs attached to him (and four each for the suffragan bishops of Argos and Lacedaemon). Nevertheless, despite its ancestry and prestige, Corinth was rapidly eclipsed by Patras during the period of Frankish rule.

Le Quien (III, 883) mentions twenty Latin prelates from 1210 to 1700, but Eubel (I, 218; II, 152) mentions twenty-two archbishops for the period from 1212 to 1476. The city was recovered by the Byzantine Despotate of the Morea in 1395, and, after a short period (1397–1404) of rule by the Knights Hospitaller, returned to Byzantine hands, where it remained until it fell to the Ottoman Empire on 8 August 1458. After this the Catholic see remained as a titular see.

The Archbishopric of Corinth became once more the centre of the Catholic Church in the Peloponnese during the brief period of Venetian rule in 1688–1715, while the Orthodox Metropolis of Patras remained the centre of the local Orthodox Church.

== Residential archbishops ==
Name	Tenure	Notes
Walter	1212 – after 1215	
Unknown	10 June 1224 – ?	
Unknown	1228	
Peter of Confluenzia	February 1268 – 5 April 1278	
William of Moerbeke	9 April 1278 – ?	
Robert	22 October 1286 – ?	
Matthew of Osenio	ca. 1294	
Louis	ca. 1300	
John of Spoleto	18 January 1306 – 5 June 1307	Apostolic administrator
James	5 June 1307 – ?	
Bartholomew	ca. 1312	
James	ca. 1340 – 7 January 1349	
Francis of Massa	29 March 1349 – ?	
Paul	15 March 1363 – ca. 1379	
Matthew	19 September 1386 – ?	
Stephen	8 July 1390 – 15 March 1395	
Peter John	26 April 1395 - 12 January 1396	
Biagio	12 January 1396 – ?	
John	ca. 25 June 1407	
Antony	?	
Peter Rainaldi	14 February 1421 – ?	

== Titular archbishops ==
Name	Tenure	Notes
Marco Antonio Saraco	31 July 1476 – ?	
Giulio de Blanchis	ca. 1512 – ?	
Juan de Sepúlveda	1517 – ?	
Alfonso Paleotti	13 February 1591 – 23 July 1597	
Dominique de Vic	1625 – 29. Oktober 1629	
Jean François Paul de Gondi	5 October 1643 – 21 March 1654	
Carlo Bonelli	16 October 1656 – 15 April 1665	
Giacomo Filippo Nini	28 April 1664 – 15 March 1666	
Stefano Ugolini	29 March 1666 – 18 April 1667	
Galeazzo Marescotti	27 February 1668 – 23 March 1676	
Francesco Martelli	9 September 1675 – 21 July 1698	
Leonardo Balsarini	19 December 1698 – 1699	
Angelo Maria Carlini	11 December 1702 – 1715	
Mondilio Orsini (Mundillus Orsini)	26 June 1724 – 20 November 1724	
Giuseppe Spinelli	5 September 1725 – 15 December 1734	
Giovanni Francesco Stoppani	14 March 1735 – 20 May 1754	
Antonius Biglia	22 July 1754 – 29 November 1755	
François Mattei	28 March 1757 – 13 March 1758	
Henry Benedict Mary Clement Stuart of York	2 October 1758 – 13 July 1761	
Marcantonio Colonna	19 April 1762 – 20 September 1784	
Ippolito Antonio Vincenti Mareri	11 April 1785 – 21 February 1794	
Giuseppe Maria Spina	10 June 1798 – 24 May 1802	
Dionisio Ridolfini Conestabile	9 August 1802 – 26 September 1803	
Giovanni Giacomo Antonio Gaetano Fraschina	26 March 1804 – 27 March 1837	
Giuseppe Angelini	21 December 1868 – ?	
Cesare Sambucetti	1 April 1882 – March 1911	
Pio Armando Pietro Sabadel	27 November 1911 – ?	
Bonaventura Cerretti	10 May 1914 – 14 December 1925	
Louis Petit	24 June 1926 – 5 November 1927	
Ettore Felici	6 November 1927 – 9 May 1951	
Gennaro Verolino	5 September 1951 – 17 November 2005	

== Sources ==
- Bon, Antoine (1969). La Morée franque. Recherches historiques, topographiques et archéologiques sur la principauté d'Achaïe [The Frankish Morea. Historical, Topographic and Archaeological Studies on the Principality of Achaea] (in French). Paris: De Boccard. OCLC 869621129.
- Gregory, Timothy E. (1991). "Corinth". In Kazhdan, Alexander (ed.). The Oxford Dictionary of Byzantium. Oxford and New York: Oxford University Press. pp. 531–533. ISBN 0-19-504652-8.
- Setton, Kenneth M. (1976). The Papacy and the Levant (1204–1571), Volume I: The Thirteenth and Fourteenth Centuries. Philadelphia: The American Philosophical Society. ISBN 0-87169-114-0.
- Vakalopoulos, Apostolos E. (1975). "Πελοπόννησος: Η τελευταία περίοδος βενετικής κυριαρχίας (1685–1715)" [Peloponnese: The last period of Venetian rule (1685–1715)]. In Christopoulos, Georgios A. & Bastias, Ioannis K. (eds.). Ιστορία του Ελληνικού Έθνους, Τόμος ΙΑ΄: Ο Ελληνισμός υπό ξένη κυριαρχία (περίοδος 1669 - 1821), Τουρκοκρατία - Λατινοκρατία [History of the Greek Nation, Volume XI: Hellenism under Foreign Rule (Period 1669 - 1821), Turkocracy – Latinocracy] (in Greek). Athens: Ekdotiki Athinon. pp. 206–209. ISBN 978-960-213-100-8.
- Pius Bonifacius Gams, Series episcoporum Ecclesiae Catholicae, Leipzig 1931, pp. 430-431
- Konrad Eubel, Hierarchia Catholica Medii Aevi, vol. 1, p. 210; vol. 2, p. 136; vol. 3, p. 178; vol. 4, pp. 164-165; vol. 5, p. 173; vol. 6, p. 183
- "Corinthe", in Dictionnaire d'Histoire et de Géographie ecclésiastiques, vol. XIII, Paris 1956, coll. 876-880
