= Dario Varotari the Elder =

Italian painter

Dario Varotari the Elder (c. 1539–1596) was an Italian painter, sculptor, and architect of the Renaissance.

Born in Verona, he was descended from a Strasburg or Augsburg family of the name of 'Weyrotter.' He was a pupil of Paolo Veronese, and an imitator of Titian. He was mainly active in Padua, where he painted for the church of Sant' Elidio. Dario Varotari the Younger was also an artist, and his grandson by the well known Paduan painter Alessandro Varotari. .
