= Pietro Correr (patriarch) =

Pietro Correr (c. 1235/40 – c. 1302) was an Italian Roman Catholic clergyman of the Correr family of Venice.

== Life ==
The son of Angelo Correr, a senator of Venice, Pietro first appears in the historical record in 1265 as pieve to the church of Sant'Aponal. In 1267 he appears as primicerius of St Mark's Basilica and in 1275 as rector of San Maurizio. Another document of 1268 shows him to have been a canon in Verona.

On the death of Tomaso Franco the relevant cathedral chapter was called upon to elect his successor as bishop of Castello, but it split between Correr's supporters and the backers of Bartolomeo I Querini, a cathedral canon and papal chaplain. The conflict continued and see remained vacant for a long time. Correr looked like winning it but eventually in 1274 pope Gregory X invalidated the election and unilaterally made Querini bishop. The anti-Correr faction in the chapter had probably fallen back on an old law that members of the chapter of St Mark's could not hold titles in the diocese of Castello - Correr was still primicerius and thus was technically still part of that chapter. In 1274 he acquired some funds from Aldinello of Bassano and the following year he attacked Alidnello's son Pietro. The dispute lasted three years and the town council of Bassano had to intervene. Several other documents also show he was still acting as primicerius at this time.

In summer 1286 he was elected Latin Patriarch of Constantinople, an honorary title since the Latin Empire had been dissolved after the Byzantine Empire's reconquest of the city in 1261. The Latin Empire had sent western clergy to replace Orthodox ones, but the former were expelled after the reconquest. Even so, the see technically continued, with a chapter of canons electing a patriarch. Correr's election was confirmed by Pope Honorius IV and he was consecrated by Latino Malabranca Orsini, bishop of Ostia. It is unclear if Correr remained in Venice or went east to run the patriarchate's remaining possessions of Crete and at Negroponte - it may have been the former, since on 10 January 1296 he was given some properties in San Pietro di Castello by Cecilia, wife of Matteo Belegno. Some sources name him Archbishop of Candia but this is an error, possibly arising from Pope Boniface VIII's union of that diocese with the patriarchate in 1302, which occurred after Correr's death.
