= Gérard Machet =

Gérard Machet (1378/9 – 17 July 1448) was a French theologian and priest. He served as the confessor of Charles VII of France from 1421, as a royal counsellor (conseiller du roi) from 1425 and as the bishop of Castres from 1432. He was one of the pseudocardinals appointed by Antipope Felix V in 1440, but he never acted as such.

A professor at the College of Navarre and a staunch Armagnac, he was forced to flee Paris in 1418. After a brief stay in Lyon, he was attached to the court of Charles VII for the rest of his life. He was one of the first to examine Joan of Arc, whom he accepted as genuine, and he was one of the early Gallicans. He was a popular preacher but not a writer, although single large collection of his letters from the 1440s survives in a single manuscript.

== Life ==
=== Early life ===
Machet was born in 1378 or 1379. Although older sources place his birth in Blois, he was probably a native of the region around Reims. He entered the College of Navarre in 1391. He appears to have obtained his bachelor's degree in theology in 1404. He received his master's in December 1410. He took up a teaching position as regent master, which he held until 1418.

In 1410, Machet received a prebend attached to the cathedral of Paris and moved into a house with Jean Gerson. He was probably by this time a priest. He participated in the "Council of Faith" that debated and condemned tyrannicide at Paris in 1413–1414. Machet sided unreservedly with the Armagnacs against the Burgundians. In 1415–1416, he was the acting subchancellor of the university while Gerson attended the Council of Constance. In this capacity, on 6 March 1416, he addressed a speech to Sigismund, King of the Romans, when the latter paid a visit to the university.

In April–May 1418, Machet was one of six clerics on the royal negotiating team at La Tombe, where a peace between the Armagnacs and the Burgundians was forged. The work of the negotiators was nullified, however, by the a coup détat at Paris. Compelled to flee Paris, Machet received a canonry in the church of Saint-Paul de Lyon in October 1418. He did not receive a prebend because that was not the practice in Lyon at the time.

=== Charles VII's confessor ===
Sometime between September 1420 and January 1421, Machet left Lyon to become the confessor of the dauphin, the future King Charles VII. He swore his oath to the prince at Mehun-sur-Yèvre. He remained Charles's confessor after his accession as king in 1422, which meant that for the last 28 years of his life he was largely itinerant—following Charles VII's court around the country. He resigned the canonry in Lyon in 1423 and received a prebend in Bourges with the archdeaconry of Nazarène. Charles VII also conferred on him a canonry and prebend of the cathedral of Chartres, although that city was under the control of the English at the time. From 1425, he was also a royal counsellor. He remained Charles VII's confessor until his own death in 1448.

In early March 1429, Machet was part of the first group of churchman to examine Joan of Arc at Chinon. Gobert Thibault, who was Machet's valet at the time, stated in a deposition during Joan's later rehabilitation trial that Machet considered her a fulfillment of prophecy, having seen "a writing that there should come a maiden who would aid the Kingdom of France". It has sometimes been claimed that Machet, being a native of Champagne and a friend of the bishop of Troyes, Jean Lesguisé, played a role in the decision of Troyes to adhere to Charles VII in 1429, when it was facing a potential siege. This is unlikely.

Machet resigned his benefices in Bourges in 1429. On 23 January 1432, Pope Eugene IV appointed him bishop of Castres. At the time, he was prévôt of Antoigné, a lordship belonging to the chapter of Saint Martin's of Tours, which benefice he resigned upon becoming bishop. On 8 December 1433, he received a papal dispensation from the obligations of residence and visitation so that he could remain the king's confessor. He remained bishop of Castres until his death. He made a first visit to his diocese before 1436. He renovated the choir of the cathedral of Castres, funding the operation through the sale of indulgences beginning in 1439.

Machet was a "champion" of Gallicanism. For the last ten years of his life, he was the main defender of the Pragmatic Sanction of Bourges of 1438. In 1440, he attended the Council of Bourges on behalf of the king, who was busy dealing with the Praguerie. He authored the royal declaration read in the council on 2 September, accepting Pope Eugene IV for the time being and calling for a new general council, rejecting the Council of Basel. On 12 November 1440, the Antipope Felix V made him a cardinal, but he was prohibited from acting as such by order of the king.

After the recapture of Paris in 1436, Machet was named administrator of the College of Navarre. In 1441, during Charles VII's stay in Paris, Machet resumed lecturing at the university for a short period. As the oldest member of the faculty, he was recognized as dean. For the last twelve years of his life, he was heavily involved in university affairs.

Machet spent his last months in the Touraine. He died at Tours on 17 July 1448. The last line of his last surviving letter describes the court's peregrinations at that time: "We pass through the country, changing residence; we carry ourselves to solitary places, propitious for rest, far from the tumult."

== Works ==
Machet was "hailed as the greatest preacher of his day", but few of his writings survive. There is a manuscript in the Bibliothèque nationale de France, Latin 8577, containing 392 letters written by Machet, mostly dating to the 1440s. Machet also engaged in correspondence with the humanist Nicolas de Clamanges between 1410 and 1417, but only the letters of Clamanges are preserved, mostly dealing with the Council of Constance.

== Bibliography ==
- Fraioli, Deborah A. (2000). Joan of Arc: The Early Debate. The Boydell Press.
- Santoni, Pierre (2011). "Gérard Machet, confesseur et conseiller de Charles VII, évêque de Castres (1380–1448)". HAL Sciences Humaines et Sociales.
- Strong, James; McClintock, John, eds. (1880). "Machet, Gerard or Girard". The Cyclopedia of Biblical, Theological, and Ecclesiastical Literature. Haper and Brothers.
- Vanderpoel, Matthew (2020). Contingency, Theology, and Poetry at the Collège de Navarre in the Age of Gerson (PDF) (PhD diss.). University of Chicago.
