= Nicholas of Clamanges =

French humanist and theologian

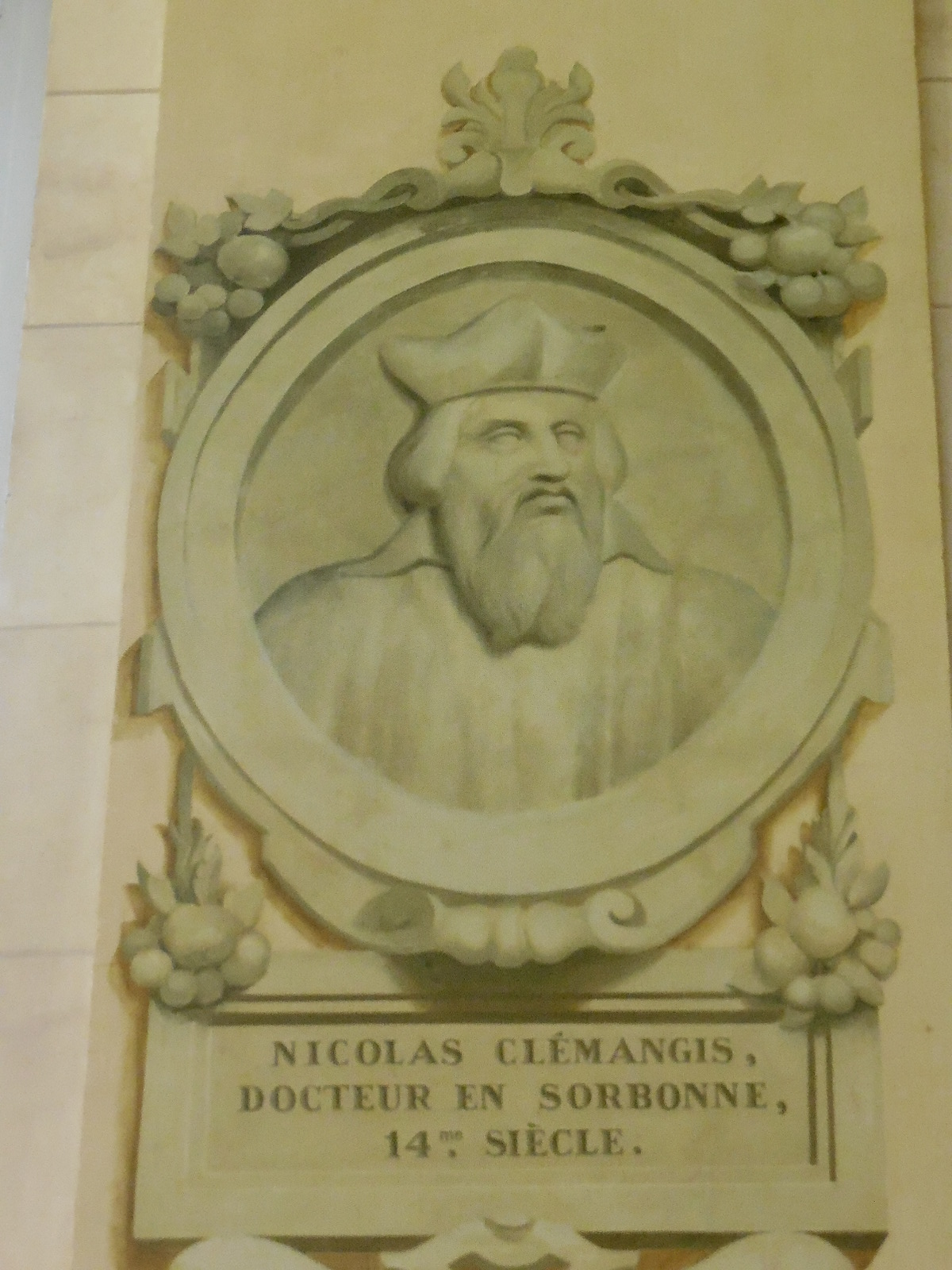
"Nicolas Clémangis"

Nicholas of Clamanges (c. 1360, died in Paris between 1434 and 1440) was a French humanist and theologian.

== Biography ==
Born in Champagne, Clamanges studied in the Collège de Navarre, University of Paris, and in 1380 received the degree of Licentiate, and then later received a Master of Arts. He studied theology under Jean Gerson and Pierre d'Ailly, and received the degree of Bachelor of Theology in 1393.

He had begun to lecture at the university in 1391 and was appointed its rector in 1393, a position he filled until 1395. The Western Schism then became a major cause of conflict within Christianity, and three methods were proposed to re-establish peace: compromise, concession, and a general council.

From 1380 to 1394 the University of Paris advocated a general council. In 1394 another tendency was manifest; i.e. both Pope Boniface IX and Pope Clement VII were held responsible for the continuance of the schism, and their resignations decreed to be the means of obtaining peace. To this end a letter was written to King Charles VI by three of the most learned masters of the university, d'Ailly, Clamanges, and Gilles des Champs, with des Champs and d'Ailly preparing the content. The letter was unsuccessful, and the university was ordered to abstain from further discussion.

Clamanges, forced to resign the rectorship of the university, then became canon and dean of Saint-Clodoald in 1395, and later on canon and treasurer of Langres. The antipope Benedict XIII, who admired his Latin style, took him for his secretary in 1397, and he remained at Avignon until 1408, when he abandoned Benedict because of the latter's conflict with Charles VI.

Clamanges now retired to the Carthusian monastery of Valprofonde, and later to Fontaine Notre-Dame en Valois. In 1412 he returned to Langres, and was appointed Archdeacon of Bayeux. His voice was heard successively at the Council of Constance (1414), and at Chartres (1421), where he defended the "liberties" of the Gallican Church. In 1425 he was teaching rhetoric and theology in the College of Navarre, where, most probably, he died.

== Works ==
Clamanges wrote a total of 14 treatises, about 150 letters and about a dozen prayers and poems. While at Valprofonde and Fontaine, he wrote:

- De Fructu eremi (dedicated to Pierre d'Ailly)
- De Fructu rerum adversarum
- De novis festivitatibus non instituendis
- De studio theologico (in which he exhibits his dislike for the Scholastic method in philosophy)

Fifteen of Clamagnes's letters are addressed to Gérard Machet. In one of these, "Babylon is to be fled", he reviles urban living, and the city of Paris in particular. Cities were places of sin and distraction that the true Christian should flee.

Clamanges is also credited with the authorship of the work De corrupto Ecclesiae statu, first edited by Konrad Cordatus (possibly with Ulrich von Hutten) in 1513, strongly criticizing the morality and discipline of the contemporary church. Hence he is sometimes considered a reformer of the type of Wyclif and Hus. Schubert, however, in his book Ist Nicolaus von Clémanges der Verfasser des Buches De corrupto Ecclesiae statu? (Grossenhain, 1882; Leipzig, 1888) suggested that, although a contemporary, Clamanges was not the author of the book.

Clamanges's works were edited in two volumes by Johannes Lydius a Protestant minister of Frankfort (Leyden, 1613). His letters are in Luc d'Achery's Spicilegium, volume I, 473 sqq.

== Sources ==
- Bellitto, Christopher. Nicolas de Clamanges: spirituality, personal reform, and pastoral renewal on the eve of the reformations. Washington, DC: Catholic University of America Press, 2001.
- Santoni, Pierre. "Les lettres de Nicolas de Clamanges à Gérard Machet: Un humaniste devant la crise du royaume et de l'Église (1410-1417)". Mélanges de l'École française de Rome 99 (1987): 793–823.
