= Nicolas de Nonancourt =

French university Chancellor, Dean of a Cathedral, and Roman Catholic Cardinal

Cardinal Nicolas de Nonancourt
- Cardinal-Priest
- Church: San Lorenzo in Damaso

Orders
- Created cardinal: 18 September 1294 by Pope Celestine V

Personal details
- Died: 23 September 1299
- Occupation: Dean of Cathedral of Notre Dame, Paris (1288-1294)
- Education: Degree of Master (Magister)
- Alma mater: Chancellor, University of Paris

Nicolas de Nonancourt (born at Nonancourt, at a date unknown; died 23 September 1299, the Feast of Saint Maurice). He was a French university Chancellor, Dean of a Cathedral, and Roman Catholic Cardinal.

== Family ==
Nonancourt was not the family name, derived from an ancient noble family of Paris (as Ferdinand Ughelli supposed); François Duchesne pointed out that there was no such Parisian family. Nonancourt is mentioned in Cardinal Nicolas' memorial inscription as the villa in which he spent many happy days; it is a few miles west of the town of Dreux.

Nicolas had a brother, Magister Petrus Layde, Canon of Evreux. The notion that Nicolas de Nonancourt's family name was Layde (or L'Ayde, or L'Aide) apparently derives from this notice. It is not necessarily the case, however, that Layde was Canon Pierre's surname; it may have been a nickname or sobriquet to distinguish him from another Pierre in the Church of Evreux. Nicolas seems never to have used the name Layde.

== Career in Paris ==
Nicolas de Nonancourt was Chancellor of the University of Paris (1284-1288). During his term he preached at least one sermon, the text of which has survived, "Sermo in dominica in Adventu, mag. Nicolai, cancellarii Parisiensis". The extracts of another undated sermon, Laudemus viros gloriosos, in which he deplores the activities of certain persons who were 'fishing in troubled waters', have been published. Nicolas was deeply involved in the conflict between the Regular masters of Theology and the Secular Masters and Canons of Paris. In 1288, he refused to confer the Licenciate in Theology on the FranciscanGiovanni da Morrovalle, despite papal demands.

Dean of the Cathedral of Notre Dame de Paris (1288-1294).

== Cardinal (1294—1299) ==
On 18 September 1294 he was created Cardinal Priest by Pope Celestine V and assigned the titular church of San Marcello; then he moved to the titulus of San Lorenzo in Damaso in 1295.

On 21 June 1295, he subscribed the Bull of Boniface VIII granting the Kingdoms of Aragon and Valencia to James, the son of King Pedro, who had been deposed and excommunicated by the pope.

=== Income ===
His income was considerable.For the year 1295, as his share from the census alone, he received 1,000 florins, and for the year 12969,009 florins and 13 denarii. For the year 1297, he received 9.033 florins, 4 solidi and 4 denarii; and, for the year 1298, 3033 florins 4 solidi and 4 denarii.The income from 1299 was 2050 florins.

In 1295, he received a distribution from the contributions of the Comtat Venaissin of 83 livres Tournois, 6 sols, 8 denarii. In the books he is referred to as Nicolaus Parisien(sis). On 10 May 1297 Cardinal Nicolas shared in the money received from the deposition of Cardinals Jacopo and Pietro Colonna; Pope Boniface VIII retained half of their income, the other have was shared among the nineteen cardinals. On 24 June, from the dues paid by the Archbishop of Siena, he received as his share 33 florins, 17 sols. On 12 March 1296, his share from the dues paid by the Abbot of Cluny amounted to 95 livres Tournois, 4 solidi and 9 denarii. At Easter each cardinal received as his share from the dues paid by the Archbishop of Florence the sum of 41 florins and 7 solidi; around the same time, from the Archbishop of Tours, he received 7 livres Tournois, 14 sols, and 11 denarii. At Easter 1296 the Archbishop of Rouen's dues brought him 20 livres Tournois, 14 sols and 9 denarii. At Easter 1298, again from the Archbishop of Tours, he received 25 gold florins, and 11+ sols;at Pentecost, the dues of the Archbishop of Rouen brought him 31 livres Tournois and 5 solidi. On 5 September 1298 he received from the dues of the Abbot of Majoris Monasterii (Marmoutier) in Tours the sum of 11 livres Tournois. There were many other distributions in which he probably participated, though his name does not specifically appear.

=== Activities ===
In the winter of 1297/1298 he was appointed Auditor along with Cardinal Jean Le Moine by Pope Boniface in a case involving the Diocese of Lund and the King of Denmark. In March 1298 he was a member of a commission of cardinals who examined the canonical election and character of the Abbot of Gerenrode in the diocese of Halberstadt. On 27 June 1298, he and thirteen other cardinals subscribed the Bull of Boniface VIII in which he ratified the peace between Philip IV of France and Edward I of England. At the same time he was a member of a committee of cardinals who examined the election and the personal character of the Abbot-elect of Majoris Monasterii (Marmoutier) in Tours. In the autumn of 1298 Cardinal Nicolas served on a committee of cardinals who examined the election of the Abbot of S. Geneviève in Paris. On 22 November 1298 he obtained from Pope Boniface for the benefit of the Dean and Chapter of Nôtre Dame de Paris the privilege of naminga suitable person to the office of Tabellio (secretary). On 28 March 1299, Pope Boniface ordered Cardinal Nicolas to investigate the case of a cleric of the diocese of Avranches, and, if appropriate, to dispense him from defects which prevented his ordination as a priest. On 11 May 1299 Pope Boniface notes in a letter that he had just (nuper) appointed Cardinal Nicolas to receive the resignation of the Rector of S. Albano de Bonavalle in Lisieux. On 17 June he was assigned to fill the vacancy of a parish in the diocese of Rouen.

On 20 June 1299 Pope Boniface remarked in a document concerning the case between the Archbishop of Tours and the Bishop of Dol about the rights of the former over the latter, that, after much litigation, he had appointed Cardinal Nicolas as Auditor (Judge) in the case. On 29 July 1299 Cardinal Nicholas was present in the papal palace at Anagni for the resignation of Stoldus of Florence from a church in Pistoria. On 9 August 1299 the Pope remarked that Cardinal Nicolas had been one of the three examiners of the appointment of a new Abbot for the monastery of S. Salvatore in Ferentino. On the same day the Pope noted that Nicolas had carried out the same function for the Abbot of the monastery of S. Ambrose in Milan.

== Death, Testament ==
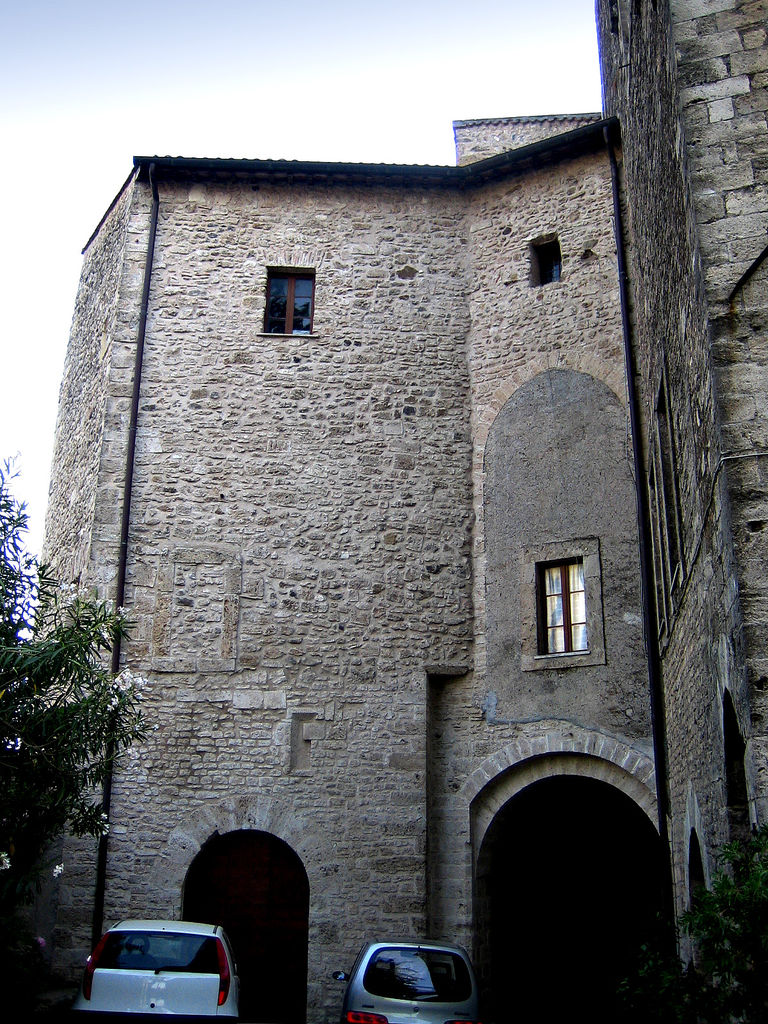
Papal Palace, Anagni

Cardinal Nicolas de Nonancourt made his Last Will and Testament in Anagni in 1299, and died on 22 September. According to the Obituarium of the Cathedral of Notre Dame, the Chapter received 6 ½ livres Parisis in a purse each year, for the land which had been purchased with the Cardinal's money at Andresiacum; likewise there was an annual commemorative distribution of the income of a piece of property which the Cardinal used to have at Laiacum.The Cardinal also left 100 livres Parisis for the fabric of the Church of Paris, as well as one livre for vestments of expensive cloth (diaper) for the Church of Paris.His anniversary was to be observed solemnly, with the Canons in choir or their vicars wearing silken copes at the Vigil and Mass.

== Bibliography ==
- Jean Roy, Nouvelle histoire des cardinaux françois, ornée de leurs portraits Tome cinquième (Paris: Chez Poinçot 1788).
- Henri Denifle, Chartularium Universitatis ParisiensisTomus I (Paris 1889; Tomus II (Paris 1891).
- Johann Peter Kirsch, Die Finanzverwaltung des Kardinalkollegiums im XIII. und XIV. Jahrhundert (Münster 1895).
- Paul Maria Baumgarten (1897), "Die Cardinalsernennungen Cälastins V. im September und Oktober 1294," (Stephan Ehses, editor) Festschrift zum elfhundertjährigen Jubiläum des deutschen Campo Santo in Rom (Freiburg im Breisgau: Herder 1897) 161-169.
- Paul Maria Baumgarten (1898), Untersuchungen und Urkunden über die Camera Collegii Cardinalium für die Zeit von 1295 bis 1437 (Leipzig 1898).
- Georges Digard, Les registres de Boniface VIII Tome II, fasc. 5 (Paris 1890).
- Ernest Langlois, Les registres de Nicolas IV (Paris 1905).
- Ferdinand Gregorovius, History of the City of Rome in the Middle Ages, Volume V, second edition, revised (London: George Bell, 1906).
- Joseph Victor Le Clerc, Paul Meyer, Barthélemy Hauréau (editors), Histoire littéraire de la France, Volume 31 (Imprimerie nationale, 1893), pp. 22–25.Volume 26 (1898), p. 451.
- Conradus Eubel, Hierarchia catholica medii aevi I, edition altera (Monasterii 1913).
- Palémon Glorieux, Repertoire des maîtres en theologie de Paris au 13e siècle(Paris: J. Vrin, 1933), pp. 401–402.
- Agostino Paravicini Bagliani, I Testamenti dei Cardinali del Duecento (Roma: Presso la Società alla Biblioteca Vallicelliana, 1980), pp. 64–65
- Jacques Verger, Les universités françaises au Moyen Âge (Leiden: Brill, 1995), pp. 76–79.
