= Jean Gerson =

French scholar, educator, reformer and poet (1363–1429)

- Posthumous engraving, by Bernard Picart, 1714
- Born: 13 December 1363; Gerson-lès-Barby, Champagne, Kingdom of France
- Died: 12 July 1429 (aged 65); Lyon, Kingdom of France
- Occupations: Scholar, educator, reformer, poet

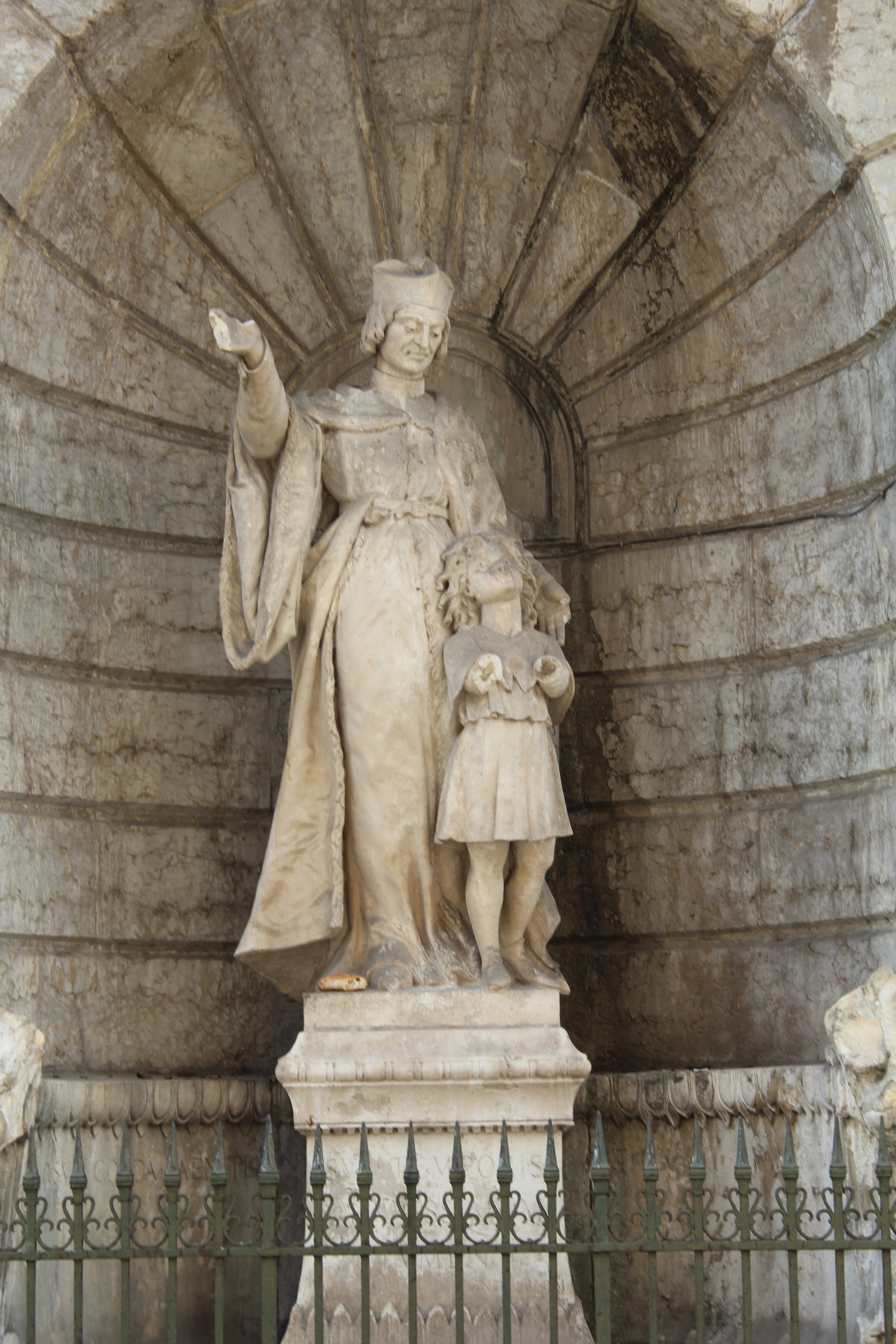
Statue of Jean Gerson in Lyon

Joannis Gersonii Opera Omnia (1706)

Jean Charlier de Gerson (13 December 1363 – 12 July 1429) was a French Roman Catholic scholar, educator, reformer, and poet, Chancellor of the University of Paris, a guiding influence of the conciliar movement and one of the most prominent theologians at the Council of Constance. He was one of the first thinkers to develop what would later come to be called natural rights theory, and was also one of the first individuals to defend Joan of Arc and proclaim her supernatural vocation as authentic.

== Early life and education ==
Gerson was born at Gerson-lès-Barby, Gerson (paroisse de Barby) a hamlet in the present municipality of Barby, Ardennes in the bishopric of Reims in Champagne. His parents, Arnulphe Charlier and Élisabeth de la Chardenière, "a second Monica," were peasants, and seven of their twelve children, four daughters and three sons, devoted themselves to a religious life. The eldest, young Gerson was sent to Paris to the famous college of Navarre when fourteen years of age.

After a five years' course he obtained the degree of licentiate of arts, and then began his theological studies under two very celebrated teachers, Gilles Deschamps (Aegidius Campensis) and Pierre d'Ailly (Petrus de Alliaco), rector of the college of Navarre, chancellor of the university, and afterwards bishop of Puy, archbishop of Cambrai and cardinal. Pierre d'Ailly remained his lifelong friend, and in later life the pupil seems to have become the teacher (see preface to Liber de vita Spir. Animae).

== Gerson and the University of Paris ==
Gerson attracted the notice of the university. He was elected procurator for the French 'nation' (the French-born Francophone students at the University) in 1383, and again in 1384, in which year he graduated bachelor of theology. Three years later a still higher honour was bestowed upon him; he was sent along with the chancellor and others to represent the university in a case of appeal taken to the pope. John of Montson (Monzón, de Montesono), an Aragonese Dominican who had recently graduated as doctor of theology at Paris, had in 1387 been condemned by the faculty of theology because he had taught that the Virgin Mary, like other ordinary descendants of Adam, was born in original sin; and the Dominicans, who were fierce opponents of the doctrine of the Immaculate Conception, were expelled from the university. John of Montson appealed to Pope Clement VII at Avignon, and Pierre d'Ailly, Gerson and the other university delegates, while they personally supported the doctrine of the Immaculate Conception, were content to rest their case upon the legal rights of the university to test in its own way its theological teachers.

He first gained fame as a popular preacher in Paris in the early 1390s. In 1392 Gerson was awarded licentiate, receiving his doctorate of theology in 1394; and in 1395, when Pierre d'Ailly was made bishop of Puy, he was, at the early age of thirty-two, elected Chancellor of the University of Paris, and made a canon of Notre-Dame. The university was then at the height of its fame, and its chancellor was necessarily a man prominent not only in France but in Europe, sworn to maintain the rights of his university. Gerson's writings bear witness to his deep sense of the responsibilities, anxieties and troubles of his position. His work has three periods, in which he was engaged in reforming the university studies, maturing plans for overcoming the schism (a task which after 1404 absorbed all his energies), and in the evening of his life writing books of devotion.

As Etienne Gilson refers, in his speech before King Charles VI of France on November 7, 1405, entitled Long Live the King, Gerson recalled the origins of the Wisdom of the University of Paris, "in order: from the first man in the Earthly Paradise to the Hebrews and then to the Egyptians through Abraham" (cf. the writings of Patriarch Joseph), then Athens, Rome and Paris.

== Gerson's writings ==
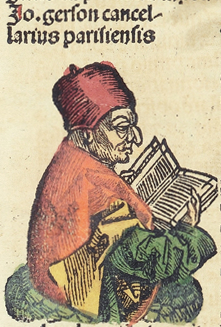
Gerson in Nuremberg Chronicles (1493)

Gerson wished to lose the more counter-productive scholastic ideas from the studies of the university, and at the same time to put some evangelical warmth into the studies, giving them a more spiritual and practical focus. He was called at this period of his life Doctor Christianissimus; later his devotional and pastoral writings brought him the title Doctor Consolatorius. His method was a clear exposition of the principles of "scientific" theology where clearness was possible, with a due recognition of the place of mystery in the Christian system of doctrine.

As Chancellor, he worked to establish academic theology as a unified discipline (Latin: communis schola): a single school (Thomistic), with a single master (Aquinas), with a single methodology (questions), all conducted in a single language (Latin), taught by authorized masters (university theologians), examined by universities, and avoiding curositas (idle speculations.) This approach marginalized Scotist and Ockhamist theology at the time, and humanist philology a century later. His plans for the reformation of university studies may be learned from his Epistolae de reform. theol. (i. I 21), Epistolae ad studentes Coligii Navarrae, quid et qualiter studere debeat novus ideologiae auditor, et contra curiositatem studentium (i. 106), Lectiones duae contra vanam curiositatem in negotio fidei (i. 86), and De mystica theologia, speculativa et practica.

Gerson focused his studies on those of previous Christian writings on mysticism—the Christian mysticism of Pseudo-Dionysius the Areopagite, the school of (Augustinian canon regular) Richard of St. Victor, (Cistercian) Bernard of Clairvaux, (Franciscan) Saint Bonaventure, and the new Brethren of the Common Life. He thought that, by laying hold of mysticism, he would equally guard against speculative scholasticism, and the seductions of Averroistic pantheism such as was preached by heretics like Amalric of Bena.

In his Tract. contra romantiam de rosa (iii. 297) he warns against the irreverent Roman de la Rose of Guillaume de Lorris and Jean de Meun—a position in which he was joined by Christine de Pizan. He was often weary of the chancellorship—it involved him in strife and in money difficulties; he grew tired of public life, and longed for learned leisure. Gerson was offered and accepted the deanery of Bruges from the duke of Burgundy, but after a short sojourn he returned to Paris and to the chancellorship.

In Catholic circles, Gerson's theology is usually held in high esteem, while his ecclesiastical doctrines are sometimes viewed as suspect due to his support for conciliarism. While scholars have contended that Gerson adopted several nominalist tenets, others have maintained that he was anti-nominalist in his basic outlook.

He thought that freedom could be exchanged in the same way as property.

== Gerson and the Great Schism ==
Gerson's chief work was toward reconciling the great schism. Pope Gregory XI had died in 1378 in Rome, one year after Gerson went to the College of Navarre, and since his death there were two claimants to the papacy, both elected by the cardinals, one in Rome and one in Avignon. This caused great confusion, as the Church could, at one time, only have one legitimate successor of Saint Peter. As the popes had been under French influence so long that it appeared to France a political necessity to have the pope reside in a French area, the French monarchy was quick to side with the Avignon pope, thus helping the schism take root. During the lifetime of Avignonian Antipope Clement VII, the University of Paris, led by Pierre d'AiIly, Gerson and Nicholas of Clémanges, met in deliberation about the state of Christendom, and resolved that the schism could be ended in three ways; by cession, if both popes renounced the office unconditionally, by arbitration, or by a general council. When Clement died, the king of France, urged by the university, sent orders that no new pope should be elected. But, the cardinals held their election first, and only then opened the king's letter. In the new elections, however, both at Rome and Avignon, the influence of Paris was so much felt that each of the new popes swore to cede if his rival would do likewise. In 1395, the French Estates General and the French clergy adopted the programme of the university — cession or a general council. The movement gathered strength. By 1398, most of the cardinals and most of the crowned heads in Europe supported the plan. During this period Gerson's literary activity was untiring. At first there were hopes of a settlement by way of cession. These come out in Protest. super statuni ecclesiae (ii. I), Tractatus de modo habendi se tempore schismatis, De schismate, etc. But soon the popes' intransigence strengthened the movement for a council—see De concilio generali unius obedientiae (ii. 24).

A council was resolved upon, to meet at Pisa, and Gerson poured forth tract after tract for its guidance. The most important are Trilogus in materia schismatis (ii. 83), and De unitate Ecclesiae (ii. 113), in which, following Pierre d'Ailly (see Paul Tschackert, Peter von Ailli, p. 153), Gerson demonstrates that the ideal unity of the church, based upon Christ, destroyed by the popes, can only be restored by a general council, supreme and legitimate, though unsummoned by a pope. The council met, deposed both antipopes, and elected Alexander V. Gerson officially addressed the new pope on his duties in Sermo coram Alexandro Papa in die ascensionis in concilio Pisano (ii. 131). Hopes of reformation, however, were crushed by the conduct of the new pope, especially his immoderate partiality toward the Franciscan Order, of which he had been a monk. He issued a bull which laid the parish clergy and the universities at the mercy of the mendicants. The University of Paris rose in revolt, headed by its chancellor Gerson, who wrote the fierce pamphlet Censura professorum in theologia circa bullam Alexandri V (ii. 442). The pope died soon after, and John XXIII (Baldassare Cossa), was elected his successor. Instead of peace, the Council of Pisa had produced only a third papacy. Pierre d'Ailly despaired of general councils (see his De difficultate reformationis in concilio universali), but Gerson struggled on.

The king's brother Louis I, Duke of Orléans, had been murdered by followers of John the Fearless, Duke of Burgundy. This had been publicly justified by a theologian, Jean Petit (c. 1360-1411). Gerson had Petit's "eight verities" — apologias for the murder — condemned by the University of Paris, the archbishop, and the grand inquisitor, and the book was publicly burned before the Notre-Dame Cathedral. Gerson wished a council to confirm this sentence. His literary labours were as untiring as ever: he wrote that a general council could depose a pope; he drew up indictments against the reigning pontiffs, reiterated the charges against Jean Petit, and exposed the sin of schism—in short, he did all he could to direct the public mind toward healing the evils in the church. Gerson's influence at the council was high up to the election of a new pope. It was he who dictated the form of submission and cession made by John XXIII, and directed the condemnation of Jan Hus.

The Council of Constance, which raised Gerson's prestige to its height, in the end became his downfall. The council, overawed by the Duke of Burgundy, would not affirm the censure of Jean Petit. The justification of murder was declared a mere opinion, not a doctrine, and only one of Petit's "verities" was condemned; and even this censure was annulled by the new pope, Martin V. Gerson dared not return to France for fear of Burgundy, who had taken power. He lived in unofficial exile in Constance, then at Rattenberg in Tirol, where he wrote his famous book De consolatione theologiae.

== Cult of St. Joseph ==
With the death of Louis I, Duke of Orléans in 1407, who was murdered on the orders of the Duke of Burgundy, John the Fearless. His defense counsel, Jean Petit, argued that it was a justifiable act of "tyrannicide". Gerson denounced Petit's propositions openly and often, and attempted to have his theory of tyrannicide condemned. In doing so, he gained the enmity of the powerful Duke of Burgundy. During the Cabochien revolt of spring 1413, his house in Paris was plundered and he only escaped assassination by taking refuge for two months up under the vaulted roofs of Notre-Dame. When Gerson emerged from his cathedral refuge in 1413 he believed he had escaped the mob through the protection of Saint Joseph and so began to promote devotion to Saint Joseph He wrote a lengthy treatise in French titled Consideration sur Saint Joseph, and his long poem in Latin, the Josephina, promoted the saint and his virtues across western Europe. Contrary to popular iconography which depicted the saint as an elderly man, Gerson argued that Joseph must have been a young, strong man, well able to support and protect the Holy Family. He described Jesus on the Flight into Egypt as "fugitive and a foreigner". In 1416 at the Council of Constance, Gerson urged the establishment of a feast day honoring the Betrothal of Mary and Joseph, for which he wrote an office.

== Retirement ==
On returning to France he went to Lyon, where his brother was prior of the Celestine monastery. Although Gerson was retired from active university life, the decade at Lyon was a time of great literary productivity. He produced a harmony of the gospels (the Monotesseron), works on the poems of the bible climaxing in a massive collection of twelve treatises on the Magnificat (Lk. 1:46-55), a commentary on the Song of Songs, as well as an extensive literary correspondence with members of the Carthusian order and others on mysticism and other issues of spiritual life. Shortly before his death he produced a tract in support of Joan of Arc. It is said that he taught a school of boys and girls in Lyon, and his only fee was to make the children promise to repeat the prayer, "Lord, have mercy on thy poor servant Gerson" (though this story has been questioned by Gerson's most recent biographer). He would die at Lyon on the 12th of July, 1429.

== Modern editions and translations ==
- A modern edition of Gerson's works in French is: Jean Gerson, Oeuvres Complètes, ed. Palémon Glorieux, 10 vols. (Paris, 1960–1973).
- The best older editions are those of Edmond Richer (3 vols., Paris, 1606) and Ellies Dupin (5 vols., Antwerp, 1706).
- The Consolation of Theology = De consolatione theologiae, ed and tr. CL Miller, (New York: Abaris Books, 1998).
- Brian Patrick McGuire (tr.), Jean Gerson: Early Works, Classics of Western Spirituality, (New York, 1988).
- Jean Gerson: Selections from A Deo exivit, Contra curiositatem studentium and De mystica theologia speculativa, introduced, edited, translated and annotated by Steven E. Ozment, (Leiden: E. J. Brill, 1969).

== External Resources ==
- Conclusiones de diversis materiis moralibus, sive De regulis mandatorum From the Rare Book and Special Collections Division at the Library of Congress
