= Chancellor of the University of Paris =

The Chancellor of the University of Paris was originally the chancellor of the chapter of Notre Dame de Paris. The medieval University of Paris ceased to exist in 1793 (though it was revived as the University of France between 1806 and 1970), but a related position, Chancellor of the Universities of Paris, is currently held by Maurice Quénet.

== List of chancellors of the cathedral school ==
These were chancellors of the cathedral school of Paris.

- Robert (c. 1116–1117)
- Algrin (1120–1146/1124–1152)
- Odo of Soissons (1164–1168)
- Petrus Comestor (1168–1178)
- Hilduin (1180–1193)
- Peter of Poitiers (1193–1205)
- Bernard Chabert (1205)
- Jean de Candelis (1209–1214/5)
- Étienne de Reims (1214/5–1218)

== List of chancellors of the university ==
=== 13th century ===
- Praepositinus (1206–1209)
- Robert of Courçon (1211– )
- Philip the Chancellor (1217–1236)
- Guiard de Laon (1236–1238)
- Odo Châteauroux (1238–1244)
- Walter of Château-Thierry (1246–1249)
- Erich von Veire ( –1263)
- Étienne Tempier (1263–1268)

=== 14th century ===
- Nicolas de Nonacourt (1284–1288)
- Berthaud of Saint-Denis (1288–1295)
- Peter of Saint-Omer (1296–1303)
- Simon de Guiberville (1303–1309)
- Francesco Caracciolo (1309/1310–1316)
- Thomas de Bailly (1316–1328)
- Jean de Blois (1328–1329)
- Guillaume Bernart de Narbonne (1329–1336)
- Robert de Bardis (1336–1349)
- John de Aciaco (1349–1360)
- Grimerius Bonifacii (1360–1370)
- John of Calore (1370–1381)
- John Blanchard (1381–1386)
- John de Guignicurte (1386–1389)
- Pierre d'Ailly (1389–1395)

=== 15th century ===
- Jean Gerson (1395–1429)
- Robert Ciboule (1451–1458)
- Jean de L'Olive (1465)
- Ambroise de Cambrai (1482–1495)

=== 16th century ===
- Jean de Gagny (1546-)

== See also ==
- List of rectors of the University of Paris
- List of University of Paris people
- Société des Amis des Universités de Paris
