= Jean Lemoine =

French canon lawyer, Cardinal, bishop of Arras and papal legate

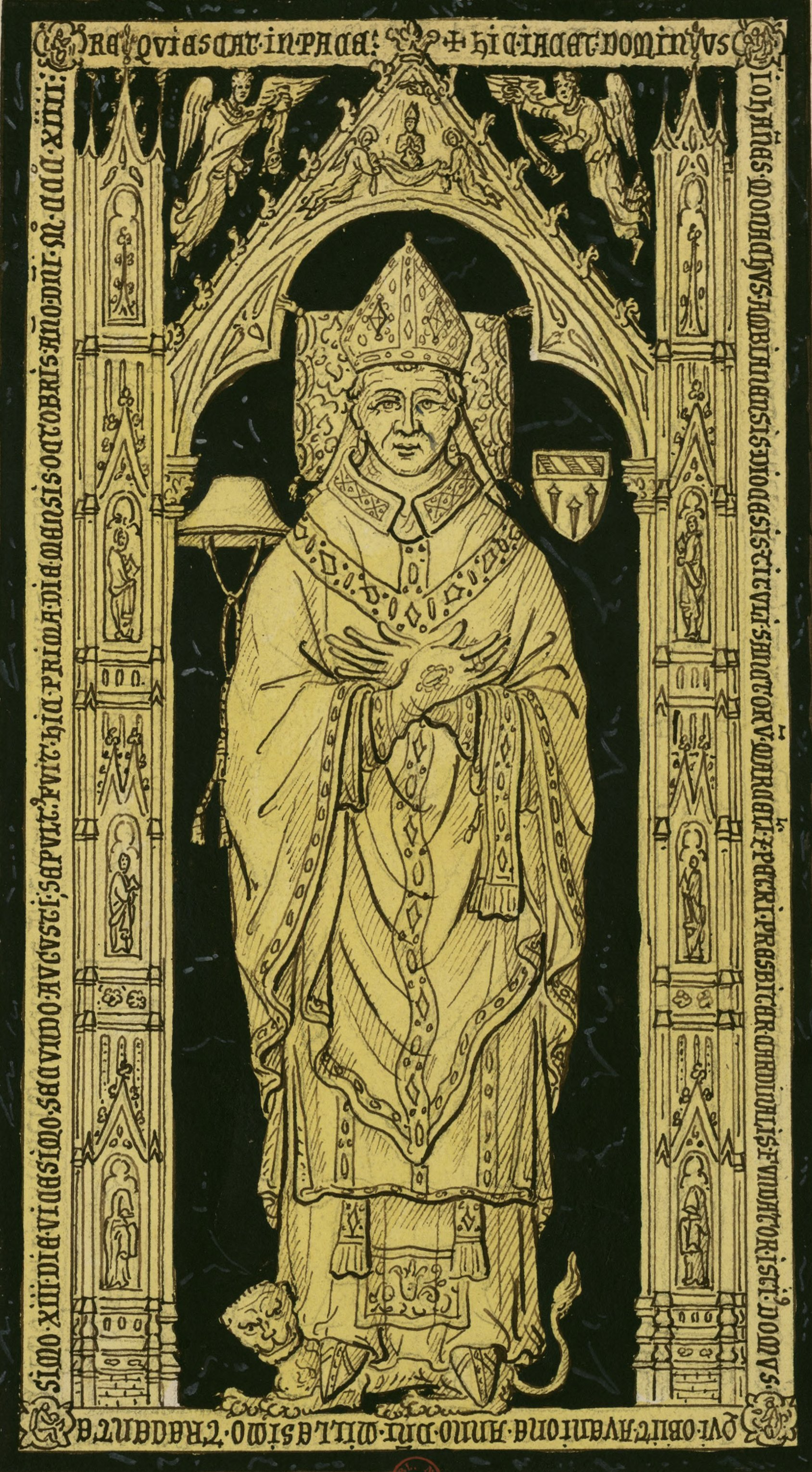

Jean Lemoine, Jean Le Moine, Johannes Monachus (1250, Crécy-en-Ponthieu – 22 August 1313, Avignon) was a French canon lawyer, Cardinal, bishop of Arras and papal legate. He served Boniface VIII as representative to Philip IV of France, and founded the Collège du Cardinal Lemoine, in Paris. He is the first canon lawyer to formulate the legal principle of the presumption of innocence.

== Early life ==
He was awarded degrees in canon law and theology by the University of Paris. He then became a canon of the cathedral chapters at Amiens and then in Paris. A royal adviser, he travelled to Rome, and was made Auditor of the Rota in 1282.

== Between France and Rome ==
Master Jean Le Moine was Dean of Bayeux Cathedral from 1288 to 1292. He was actually, during that period, not in Bayeux but at the Papal Curia, serving as Vice-Chancellor. He signed the papal bulls under Pope Nicholas IV (1288-1292) as Magister Johannes Decanus Baiocensis.

Le Moine was then elected bishop of Arras after the death of Bishop Guillaume de Issiaco on September 23, 1293. The election was finally confirmed by Boniface VIII.

Pope Celestine V created him cardinal, with the title of Saints Marcellino e Pietro, at the consistory of 18 September 1294. On 21 June 1295, he was in Anagni and attended the Consistory in which Pope Boniface recognized King James II of Aragon as the successor of King Pedro; Johannes tit. S. Marcellini et Petri presb. Card. subscribed to the bull. He is attested among the cardinal-priests, under the name Johannes Monachus, as being present in the Roman Curia and receiving his share (1/18 on this occasion) in a distribution of the income from the Treasury of the College of Cardinals on 25 November 1295. He appears again on 10 May 1297, as one of nineteen cardinals who received a share of the 50% of the income of the two deposed Colonna cardinals, thanks to the generosity of Pope Boniface VIII. When the procurator of the Bishop of Siena paid in 300 livres Tournois around 24 June 1297, Jo. Monachus was one of seventeen cardinals entitled to a share. There were many other distributions in which the names of the recipient cardinals are not listed, but which undoubtedly brought Cardinal Le Moine various sums of money.

At Easter, 1297, the Archbishop of Tours paid in 200 livres Tournois, 1/15th of which went to Cardinal Le Moine, and around Pentecost he received 1/16 of the 500 livres Tournois presented by the Archbishop of Rouen. On 5 September, thanks to the payment of the Abbot Majoris Monasterii (Marmoutier) in Tours of 180 livres Tournois, the Cardinal received a 1/15th share. In the winter of 1297/1298 he was appointed auditor by Pope Boniface in the case of a Dominican Inquisitor and a Milanese soldier.

In the winter of 1297/1298 he was appointed auditor along with Cardinal Nicolas de Nonancourt by Pope Boniface in a case involving the Diocese of Lund and the King of Denmark.

== Collège du Cardinal Lemoine ==
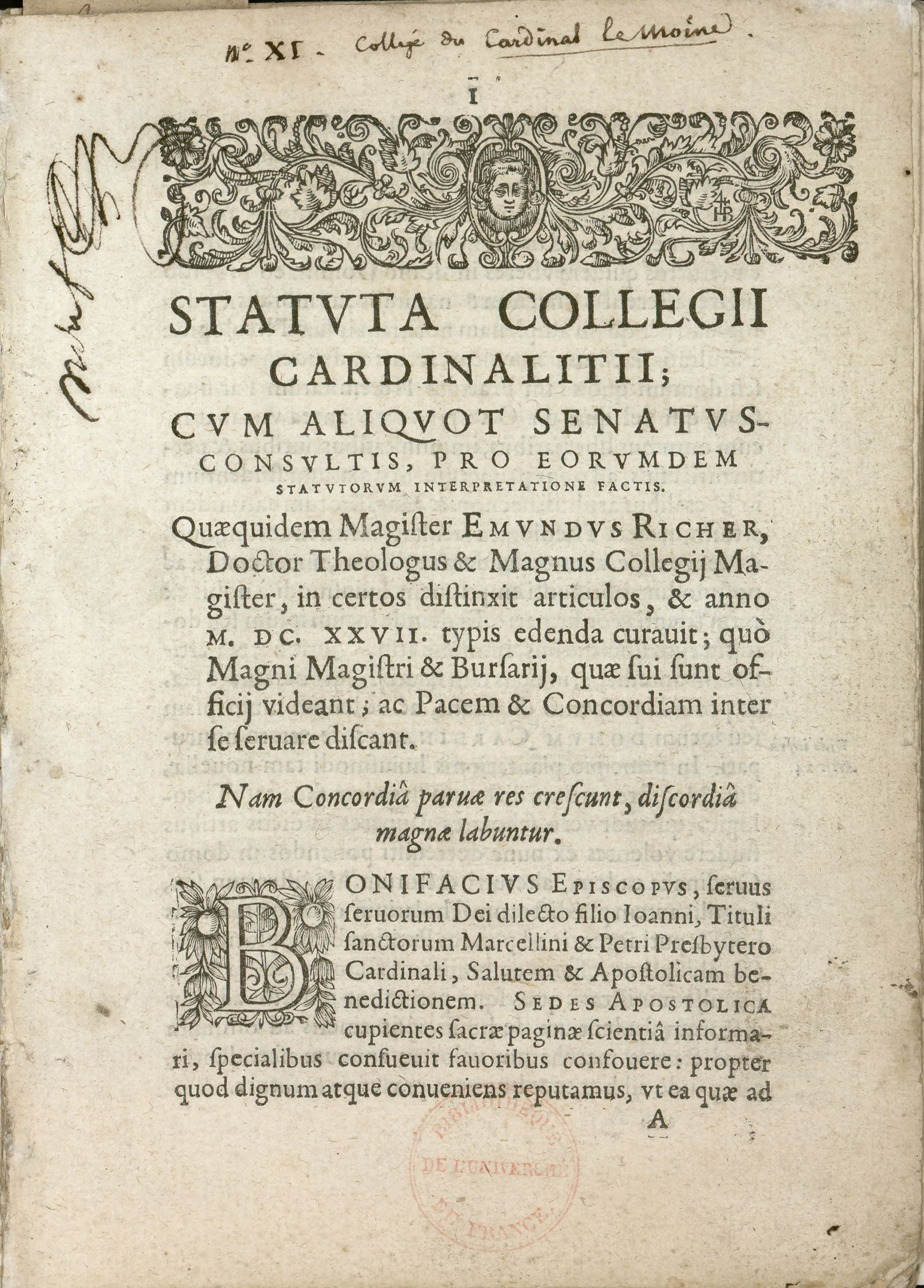

As patron, he contracted at Rome (15 March 1302) to buy from the Grands-Augustins the "Maison du Chardonnet" and adjoining land to found a college. Initially "la Maison du Cardinal", after his death it was called "Collège du Cardinal Lemoine" or "Collège du Cardinal Le Moine." Initially it was to take 60 theology students and 40 in the arts. It received approval from Boniface VIII on 4 May 1302. Beatus Rhenanus would become a student in the college from 1503 to 1507 graduating with a BA in 1506 and a MA in 1507. The French humanist Jacques Lefèvre d'Étaples was a director of the college.

== Legate ==
On 24 November 1302, Boniface VIII sent Cardinal Jean of S. Marcellino e Pietro to France as legate to Philippe le Bel. Philippe stood up to papal demands, and the Cardinal laid an interdict on the kingdom, requiring Nicolas de Fréauville, the king's confessor, to appear at the Roman Curia to make an explanation.

The pope modified the interdict to an excommunication of the king. Phillipe intercepted the messengers with the bull, at Troyes, and placed the legate Jean under surveillance. The king then called together the États Généraux (1303).

The Cardinal left Paris by night, and returned to Rome. In Rome, he was appointed Assessor by Pope Boniface, in the case of the suspension of the Bishop of Vasio from both spiritualities and temporalities. The death of the Pope interrupted the proceedings, and the suspension was not finally lifted until 18 March 1304. During his time in France as Apostolic Legate, he had been granted the right to appoint ten clerics to benefices in the various cathedrals of France (Paris, Chartres and Amiens excepted), but these were cancelled when Pope Boniface revoked and reserved to the Holy See all benefices in the Churches and Abbeys of France; Cardinal Jean was able to reinstate these ten clerics through the special favor shown to him by Pope Benedict XI.

== Roman Curia ==
His properties in France, however, were apparently being misappropriated. On 18 December 1303, the new pope, Benedict XI (1303-1304), issued a mandate, instructing several abbots in the dioceses of Bayeux and Amiens to see to it that the Cardinal's rights and the income from his benefices were protected. The letter specifically states that he was Dean of Bayeux, and that he had canonries and prebends in Bayeux, Amiens, and Paris. At the same time he was appointed by Pope Benedict to be an Auditor in the case of a dispute between the Bishop and the Chapter of Amiens. In January 1304, he was appointed to be a member of the committee to examine the election of a Bishop of Bamberg, but as soon as the committee was appointed, the bishop-elect resigned his election into the hands of the Pope, and the Pope provided the new bishop.

On 14 March 1304, he was one of the fifteen cardinals who subscribed the bull of privileges in favor of the monastery of Santo Spirito in Sulmone in the Diocese of Valva. In February 1304, the Pope assigned him the trial of facts in a complaint laid by the Abbot and monks of Farfa in the matter of the subinfeudation of Cardinal Giovanni Boccamazza to several castles and their lands, which involved the Monastery of Farfa.

== Conclave of 1304, move to Avignon ==
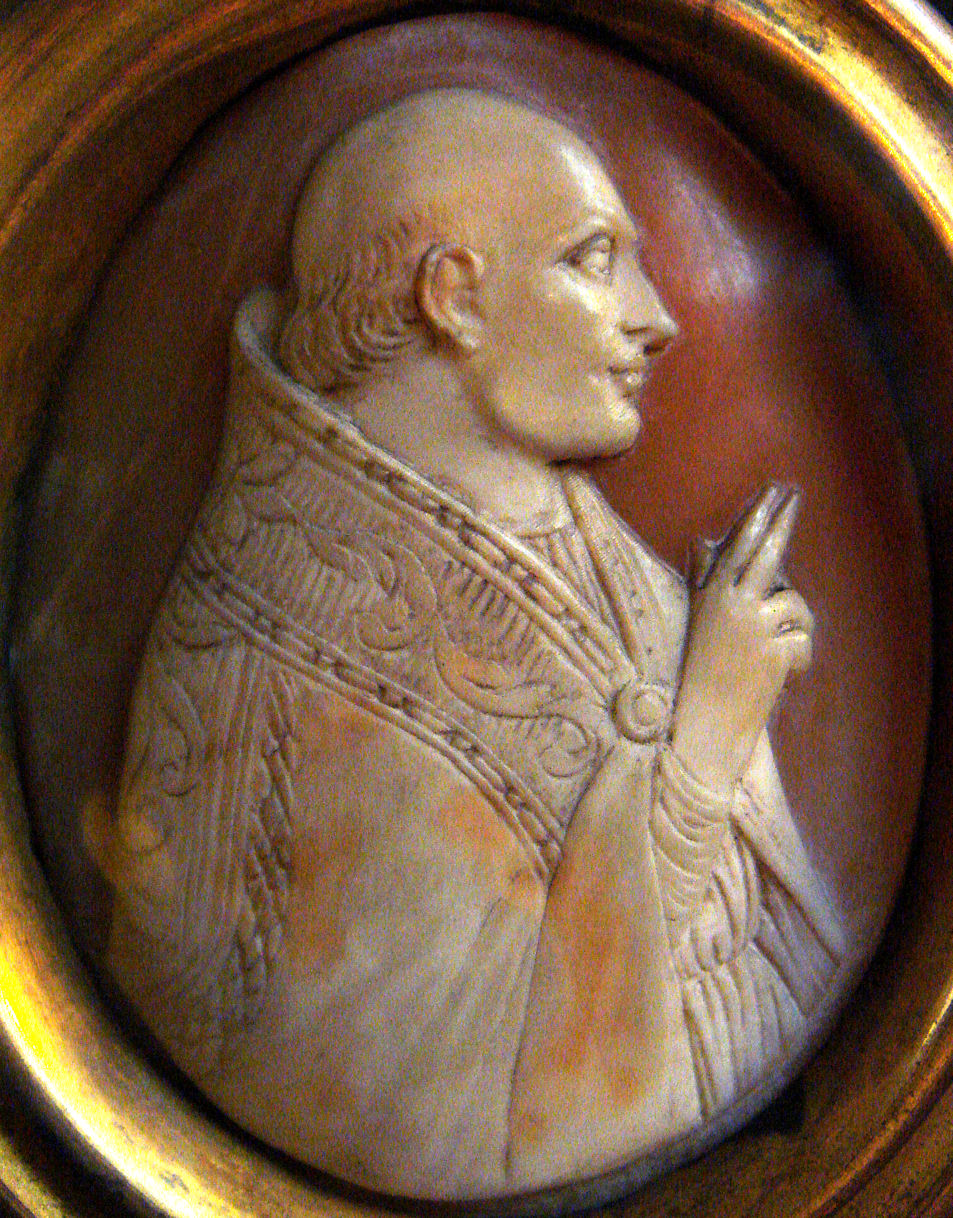
Clément V (cameo)

Pope Benedict XI died at Perugia on 7 July 1304. The Sede Vacante lasted nearly eleven months. There were nineteen qualified electors, not counting the two Colonna cardinals who had been deposed. Jean Le Moine belonged to the group led by Cardinal Napoleone Orsini, composed of ten cardinals altogether. He is said to have been the first choice of that group, but the cardinals in the opposition, led by Matteo Rosso Orsini, would by no means consent to the election. Because of illness, four cardinals did not participate in the final ballot in which the canonical election of Bertrand de Got, Archbishop of Bordeaux took place. He was elected by a bare 2/3 majority of ten votes, but finally the other five accepted the election and, of course, made it unanimous. Cardinal Jean Le Moine was absent from the Conclave, from 18 August 1304, suffering from a pain in the tibia, but his name appears among the majority at the final ballot and on the Election Manifesto. All the Cardinals attended the new pope in France, with the exception of Cardinal Robert de Pontigny, who died during the journey at Parma, on 9 October 1305.

On 6 November 1305, he was elected Camerlengo of the Sacred College of Cardinals. He stayed with Clement through all his wanderings, through to Avignon where the pope stationed himself in 1309.

Cardinal Lemoine died in Avignon. His will, dated 21 July 1313, asks that he should be buried in the chapel of his college in Paris, in rue Saint-Victor. These wishes were carried out on 1 October 1314, according to the inscription on his funeral monument (image above).

His brother André Lemoine, bishop of Noyon, was a benefactor of the College; he died in 1315. The brothers were buried in the same tomb, and a joint epitaph could be seen there up to the end of the eighteenth century.

== Works ==
His Glossa aurea Joannis Monachi cardinalis in Sextum Decretalium, a commentary on the Liber Sextus collection of canonical decretals, was presented by him to the University of Paris, with an accompanying letter, dated 16 February 1301 [1302]. The text was first printed in Paris in 1515.

He formulated the rule on presumption of innocence in the words "item quilbet presumitur innocens nisi probetur nocens (a person is presumed innocent until proven guilty)".

== Placenames ==
- The rue du Cardinal-Lemoine is a street in the 5e arrondissement, Paris
- The station Cardinal Lemoine is on line 10 of the Paris métro.

== Bibliography ==
- Dupuy, Pierre (1655) Histoire du différend d'entre le pape Boniface VIII. et Philippes le Bel Roy de France (Paris: Sébastien Cramoisy, 1655). (in French and Latin)
- Du Chesne, François (1660), Histoire de tous les cardinaux françois de naissance ou qui ont été promus au cardinalat par l’expresse recommandation de nos roys, Paris, 1660.
- Jean Hermant (1705). Histoire du Diocese de Bayeux, première partie (Caen: Pierre F. Doublet 1705).
- Roy, Jean (1788). Nouvelle histoire des cardinaux françois, ornée de leurs portraits, tome cinquième (Paris: Chez Poinçot 1788).
- Paris, Paulin (1837). Les Grands Chroniques de France, tome cinquième [1270-1381] (Paris: Techener 1837).
- Fisquet, Honoré (1864), La France pontificale, histoire chronologique et biographique des archevêques et évêques de tous les diocèses de France depuis l’établissement du christianisme jusqu’à nos jours, divisée en dix-sept provinces ecclésiastiques, Paris.
- Johannessesn, Randy M. (1988). "Cardinal Jean Lemoine and the Authorship of the Glosses to Unam Sanctam," Bulletin of Medieval Canon Law, 33 (n.s. Vol. 18), pp. 33–42
- Jourdain, Charles (1876). Le Collège du cardinal Lemoine, Paris, 1876.
