= Ancient Diocese of Castres =

Roman Catholic diocese in France (1317 - 1801)

Coordinates: 43.60°N 2.24°E

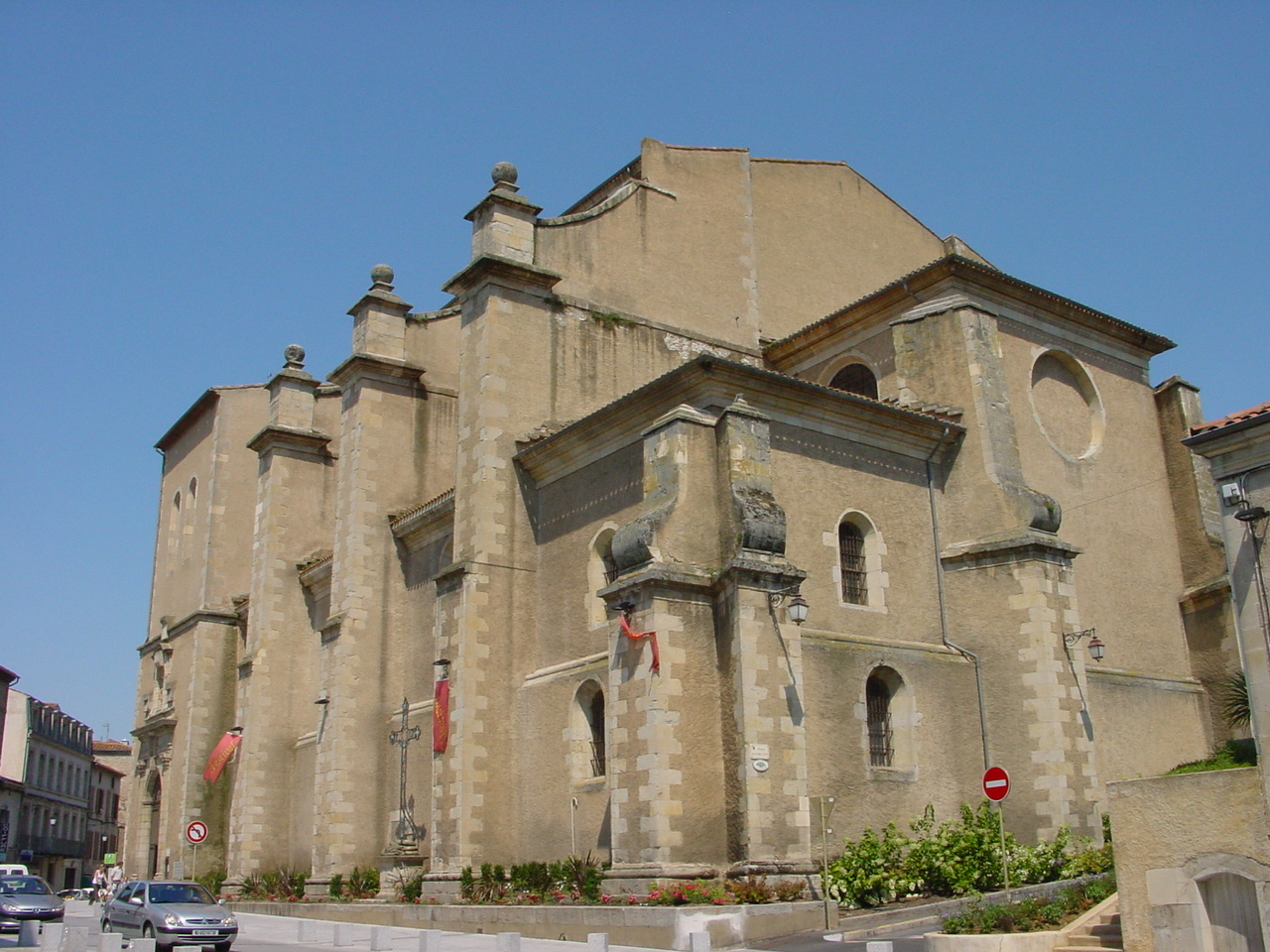
Castres Cathedral

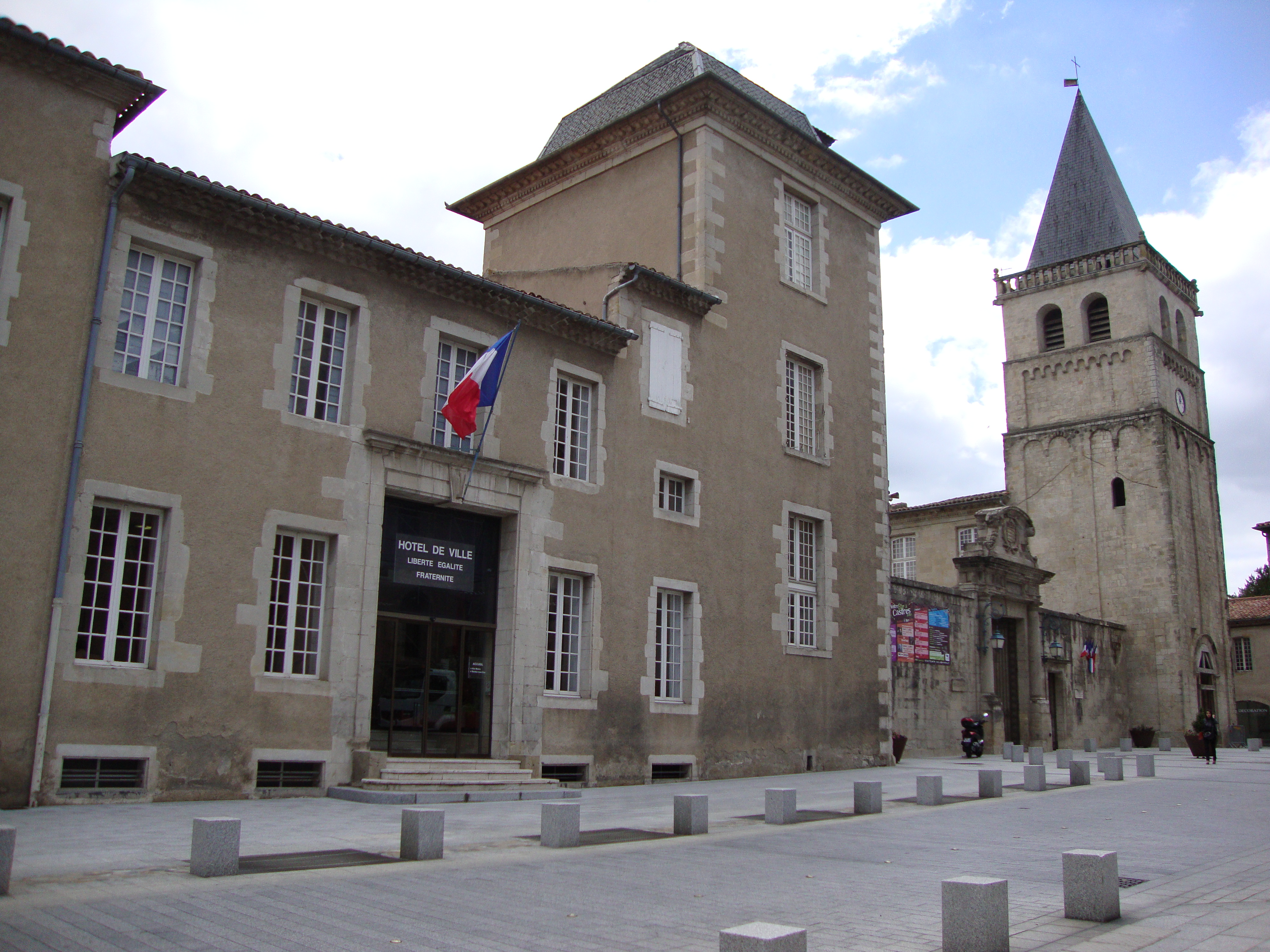
Former palace of the Bishops, now the town hall and a museum

The Catholic Diocese of Castres, in Southern France, was created in 1317 from the diocese of Albi. It was suppressed at the time of the French Revolution, under the Concordat of 1801. Its territory returned to the archdiocese of Albi.

The bishop of Castres had his seat at Castres Cathedral.

== Bishops ==
- 5 August 1317 to 1327: Dieudonné I.
- 1328–1338: Amelius de Lautrec
- 1338–1353: Jean I. des Prés
- 1353–1359: Etienne de Abavo
- 1359–1364: Pierre I. de Bagna
- 31 May 1364 to 1374: Raimond I. de Sainte-Gemme
- 1375 to 30 May 1383: Elie de Donzenac
- 8 October 1383 to 1386: Guy de Roye
- 1386–1388: Dieudonné II.
- 2 December 1388 to 27 May 1418: Jean II. Engeard
- 1418–1421: Aimeric Noël
- 1423–1427: Raimond Mairose
- c. 1428: Jean III. Amardy
- c. 1430: Pierre II. de Cotigny
- 1432 to 17. July 1448: Gérard Machet
- 1449 to 6. August 1458: Maraud de Condom
- 1460–1493: Jean IV. d'Armagnac
- 1494 to 2. July 1509: Charles I. de Martigny
- 1509: Jean V. de Martigny
- 1509–1526: Pierre III. de Martigny
- 1528–1530: Charles II. de Martigny
- 1531–1535: Jacques de Tournon
- 1535–1551: Antoine-Charles de Vesc
- 1552–1583: Claude d'Auraison
- 1583 to 13 May 1632: Jean VI. de Fossé
- 13 May 1632 to 1654: Jean VII. de Fossé
- 1657 to 1. Juli 1662: Charles-François d'Anglure de Bourlemont
- 1664 to 16. April 1682: Michel Tubeuf
- 3 July 1682 to 11. April 1705: Augustin de Maupeou
- 11 April 1705 to 26. June 1736: Honoré de Quiqueran de Beaujeu
- 1736 to 24 May 1752: François de Lastic de Saint-Jal
- 1752–1773: Jean-Sébastien de Barral
- 1773–1790: Jean-Marc de Royère

== See also ==
- Catholic Church in France
- List of Catholic dioceses in France

== Bibliography ==
=== Reference works ===
- Gams, Pius Bonifatius (1873). Series episcoporum Ecclesiae catholicae: quotquot innotuerunt a beato Petro apostolo. Ratisbon: Typis et Sumptibus Georgii Josephi Manz. (Use with caution; obsolete)
- Eubel, Conradus, ed. (1913). Hierarchia catholica, Tomus 1 (second ed.). Münster: Libreria Regensbergiana. (in Latin)
- Eubel, Conradus, ed. (1914). Hierarchia catholica, Tomus 2 (second ed.). Münster: Libreria Regensbergiana. (in Latin)
- Gulik, Guilelmus (1923). Eubel, Conradus (ed.). Hierarchia catholica, Tomus 3 (second ed.). Münster: Libreria Regensbergiana.
- Gauchat, Patritius (Patrice) (1935). Hierarchia catholica IV (1592-1667). Münster: Libraria Regensbergiana.
- Ritzler, Remigius; Sefrin, Pirminus (1952). Hierarchia catholica medii et recentis aevi V (1667-1730). Patavii: Messagero di S. Antonio.
- Ritzler, Remigius; Sefrin, Pirminus (1958). Hierarchia catholica medii et recentis aevi VI (1730-1799). Patavii: Messagero di S. Antonio.

=== Studies ===
- Duchesne, Louis (1910). Fastes épiscopaux de l'ancienne Gaule: II. L'Aquitaine et les Lyonnaises. Paris: Fontemoing.
- Du Tems, Hugues (1774). Le clergé de France, ou tableau historique et chronologique des archevêques, évêques, abbés, abbesses et chefs des chapitres principaux du royaume, depuis la fondation des églises jusqu'à nos jours (in French). Vol. Tome premier. Paris: Delalain.
- Jean, Armand (1891). Les évêques et les archevêques de France depuis 1682 jusqu'à 1801 (in French). Paris: A. Picard.
