= Pierre d'Ailly =

French Catholic cardinal and theologian (1351–1420)

His Eminence Pierre d'Ailly
- Cardinal-Priest of San Crisogono
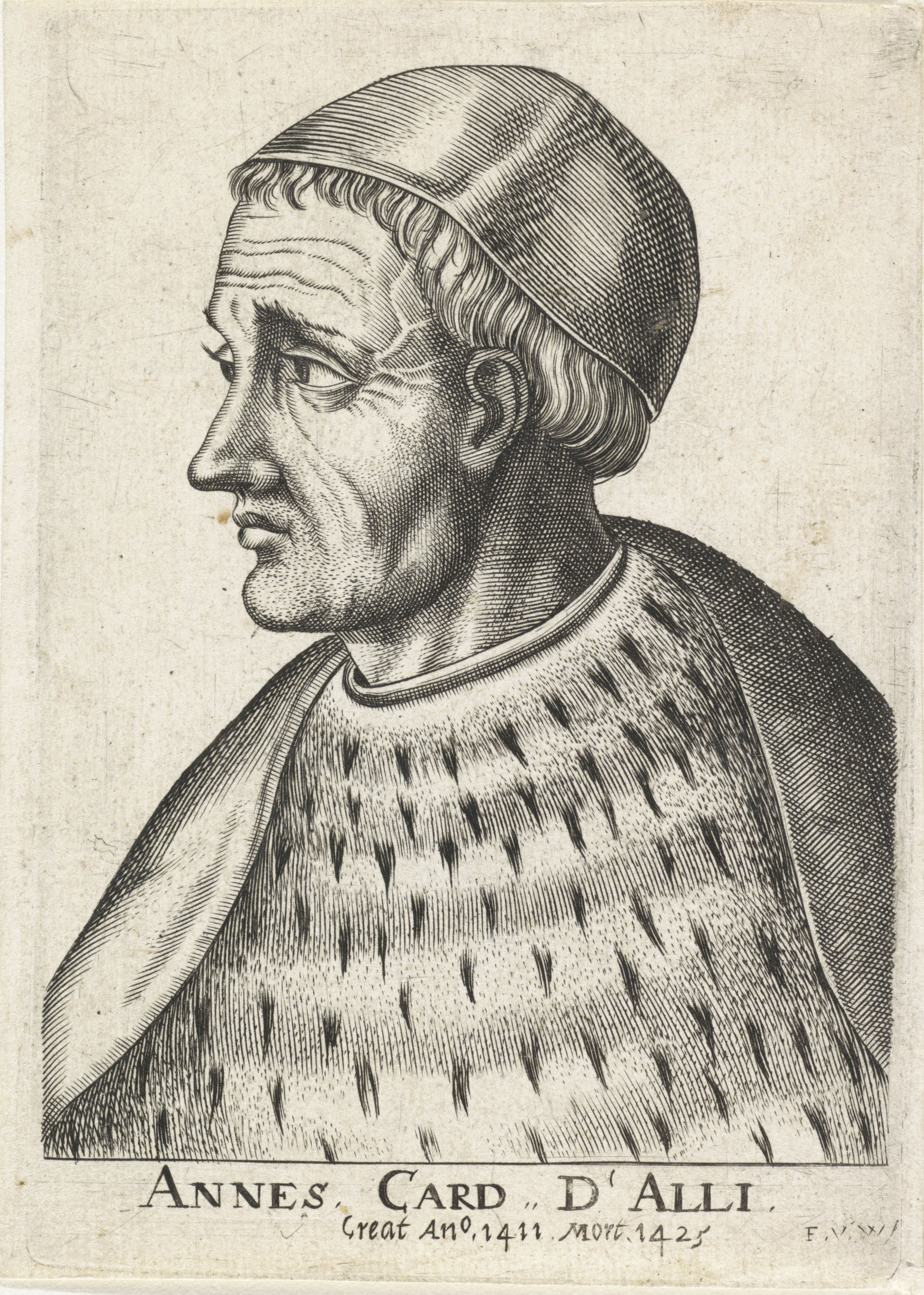
- Pierre d'Ailly
- Church: Catholic Church

Orders
- Consecration: 6 June 1411 by Antipope John XXIII

Personal details
- Born: 1351 Compiègne, Kingdom of France
- Died: 9 August 1420 (aged 68–69) Avignon, Comtat Venaissin
- Education: College of Navarre

Pierre d'Ailly (French: [d‿aji]; Latin: Petrus Aliacensis, Petrus de Alliaco; 1351 – 9 August 1420) was a French theologian, astrologer and cardinal of the Catholic Church.

== Academic career ==
D'Ailly was born in Compiègne in 1350 or 1351 of a prosperous bourgeois family. He studied in Paris at the Collège de Navarre, receiving the licentiate in arts in 1367 and the master's a year later, and was active in university affairs by 1372. D'Ailly taught the Bible in 1375 and the Sentences of Peter Lombard in 1376–1377, and received the licentiate and doctorate in theology in 1381. He was affiliated with the university, serving as rector in 1384; among his pupils were Jean Gerson and Nicholas of Clémanges.

The church's Great Schism, between two popes, arose in 1378. In the spring of 1379, d'Ailly, in anticipation even of the decision of the University of Paris, had carried to the pope of Avignon, Clement VII, the "role" of the French nation. Notwithstanding this prompt adhesion, he was firm in his desire to put an end to the schism, and when, on 20 May 1381, the university decreed that the best means to this end was to gather together a general council, d'Ailly supported this motion before the king's council in the presence of the Duke of Anjou. The dissatisfaction displayed shortly after by the government obliged the university to give up this scheme, and this was probably the cause of Pierre d'Ailly's temporary retirement to Noyon, where he held a canonry. There he continued the struggle for his side in a humorous work, in which the partisans of the council are amusingly taken to task by the demon Leviathan.

D'Ailly returned to prominence by leading the university's effort to secure removal of John Blanchard as chancellor, in which Blanchard was accused by d'Ailly before the Avignon antipope Clement VII of abuse of office. Subsequently, d'Ailly was twice entrusted with a mission to Clement VII in 1388 to defend the doctrines of the university, and especially those concerning the Immaculate Conception of the Virgin, against the preaching friar Jean de Montson, and in 1389 to petition in the name of the king for the canonization of the young cardinal Pierre de Luxembourg. The success which attended his efforts on these two occasions, and the eloquence which he displayed, perhaps contributed to his choice as the king's almoner and confessor. At the same time, by means of an exchange, he obtained to the highest dignity in the university, becoming chancellor of Notre-Dame de Paris. This acceptability to many interests helps explain his advancement.

D'Ailly served as chancellor of the University from 1389 to 1395, and Gerson succeeded him. Both were involved in expelling the Dominican Order from the university for refusing to embrace the idea of the Immaculate Conception and in the effort mentioned above to end the Great Schism by means of an ecumenical council.

When Antipope Benedict XIII succeeded Clement VII at Avignon in 1394, d'Ailly was entrusted by the king with a mission of congratulation to the new pontiff. His obsequious language on this occasion, and the favours with which it was rewarded, formed a too violent contrast to the determined attitude of the university of Paris, which, tired of the schism, was even then demanding the resignation of the two pontiffs. D'Ailly himself had not long before taken part in the drawing up of a letter to the king in which the advantages of this double abdication were set forth, but since then his zeal had seemed to cool a little. Nevertheless, on his return from Avignon, he again in the presence of the king enlarged upon the advantages offered by the way which the university commended.

The suspicions aroused by his conduct found further confirmation when he caused himself—or allowed himself—to be nominated bishop of Le Puy by Benedict on 2 April 1395. The great number of benefices which he held left room for some doubt as to his disinterestedness. Henceforward he was under suspicion at the university, and was excluded from the assemblies where the union was discussed.

== Ecclesiastical career ==
=== Appointments ===
D'Ailly's ecclesiastical career prospered, however. After Le Puy, he was appointed Bishop of Noyon, and Bishop of Cambrai (1397). By virtue of this position, he became also a prince of the Holy Roman Empire. In order to take possession of his new episcopal see, he had to brave the wrath of Philip, Duke of Burgundy, override the resistance of the clergy and bourgeoisie, and even withstand an armed attack on the part of several lords; but his protector, the duke of Orleans, had his investiture performed by Wenceslaus, king of the Romans. The latter, though a partisan of the pope of Rome, took the opportunity of enjoining on d'Ailly to go in his name and argue with the pope of Avignon, a move which had as its object to persuade Benedict to an abdication, the necessity of which was becoming more and more evident. However, the language of d'Ailly seems on this occasion to have been lacking in decision; however that may be, it led to no felicitous result. From this point on, he spent most of his energy to addressing the schism. Although he was slow at first to embrace the conciliar solution to the Schism, he was participating in councils by 1409.

=== Schismatic pressures ===
France next tried to bring violent pressure to bear to conquer the obstinacy of Benedict XIII by threatening a formal withdrawal from his obedience. D'Ailly, who, in spite of his attachment to the pope, had been carried away by the example of the kingdom, was among the first who, in 1403, after experience of what had happened, counselled and celebrated the restoration of obedience. He was sent by Charles VI on an embassy to Benedict and seized this opportunity of lavishing on the pontiff friendly congratulations mingled with useful advice. Two years later, before the same pontiff, he preached in the city of Genoa a sermon which led to the general institution, in the countries of the obedience of Avignon, of the festival of the Holy Trinity.

At the ecclesiastical council which took place at Paris in 1406, d'Ailly made every effort to avert a new withdrawal from the obedience and, by order of the king, took the part of defender of Benedict XIII, a course which yet again exposed him to attacks from the university party. The following year he and his disciple Gerson formed part of the great embassy sent by the princes to the two pontiffs, and while in Italy he was occupied in praiseworthy but vain efforts to induce the pope of Rome to remove himself to a town on the Italian coast, in the neighbourhood of his rival, where it was hoped that the double abdication would take place. Discouraged by his failure to effect this, he returned to his diocese of Cambrai at the beginning of 1408. At this time he was still faithful to Benedict, and the disinclination he felt to joining the members of the French clergy who were on the point of ratifying the royal declaration of neutrality excited the anger of Charles VI's government, and a mandate, which was however not executed, ordered the arrest of the bishop.

=== Conciliar councils ===
It was not until after the cardinals of the two colleges had led to the convocation of the Council of Pisa (1409) that d'Ailly renounced his support of Benedict XIII, and, for want of a better policy, again allied himself with the cause which he had championed in his youth. In the council lay now, to judge from his words, the only chance of salvation; and, in view of the requirements of the case, he began to argue that, in case of schism, a council could be convoked by any one of the faithful, and would have the right to judge and even to depose the rival pontiffs. This was, in fact, the procedure of the council of Pisa, in which d'Ailly took part. After the declaration of the deposition of the Roman pope Gregory XII and Benedict XIII, the council went on to elect Alexander V (26 June 1409). This pope reigned only ten months; his successor, John XXIII, raised d'Ailly to the rank of cardinal (6 June 1411), and further, to indemnify him for the loss of the bishopric of Cambrai, conferred upon him the administration of that of Limoges (3 November 1412), which was shortly after exchanged for the bishopric of Orange. He also nominated d'Ailly as his legate in Germany (18 March 1413).

Forgetting these benefits, d'Ailly was one of the most formidable adversaries of John XXIII at the Council of Constance (1414–1418); with Gerson, d'Ailly was one of the leading theologians at the council. Convinced as he was of the necessity for union and reform, he contributed more than anyone to the adoption of the principle that, since the schism had survived the Council of Pisa, it was necessary again to take up the work for a fundamental union, without considering the rights of John XXIII any more than they had those of Gregory XII and Benedict XIII. From this point of view d'Ailly, together with his compatriot Cardinal Fillastre, took the preponderating part during the first few months. Afterwards, seeing the trend of events, he showed some uneasiness and hesitation. He refused, however, to undertake the defence of John XXIII, and only appeared in the trial of this pope to make depositions against him, which were sometimes of an overwhelming character.

Other matters which claimed his attention at Constance included the condemnation of John Wycliffe and the trial of Jan Hus. The reading in public of his two treatises De Potestate ecclesiastica and De Reformatione Ecclesiae revealed, besides ideas very peculiar to himself on the reform and constitution of the church, his design of reducing the power of the English in the council by denying them the right of forming a separate nation (1 October – 1 November 1416). By this campaign, which exposed him to the worst retaliation of the English, he inaugurated his role of "procurator and defender of the king of France."

When at last the question arose of giving the Christian world a new pope, this time sole and uncontested, d'Ailly defended the right of the cardinals, if not to keep the election entirely in their own hands, at any rate to share in the election, and he brought forward a system for reconciling the pretensions of the council with the rights of the College of Cardinals. In this way was elected Pope Martin V (11 November 1417), and the task of d'Ailly was at last finished.

== Retirement ==
After the council, d'Ailly returned to Paris. When in France's civil discord the Burgundian faction seized Paris in 1419, killing some professors in the process, he fled south and retired to Avignon. His former pupil Gerson settled nearby at a house of the Celestine Order. D'Ailly, known as the Cardinal of Cambrai, died in 1420 in Avignon.

== Writings ==
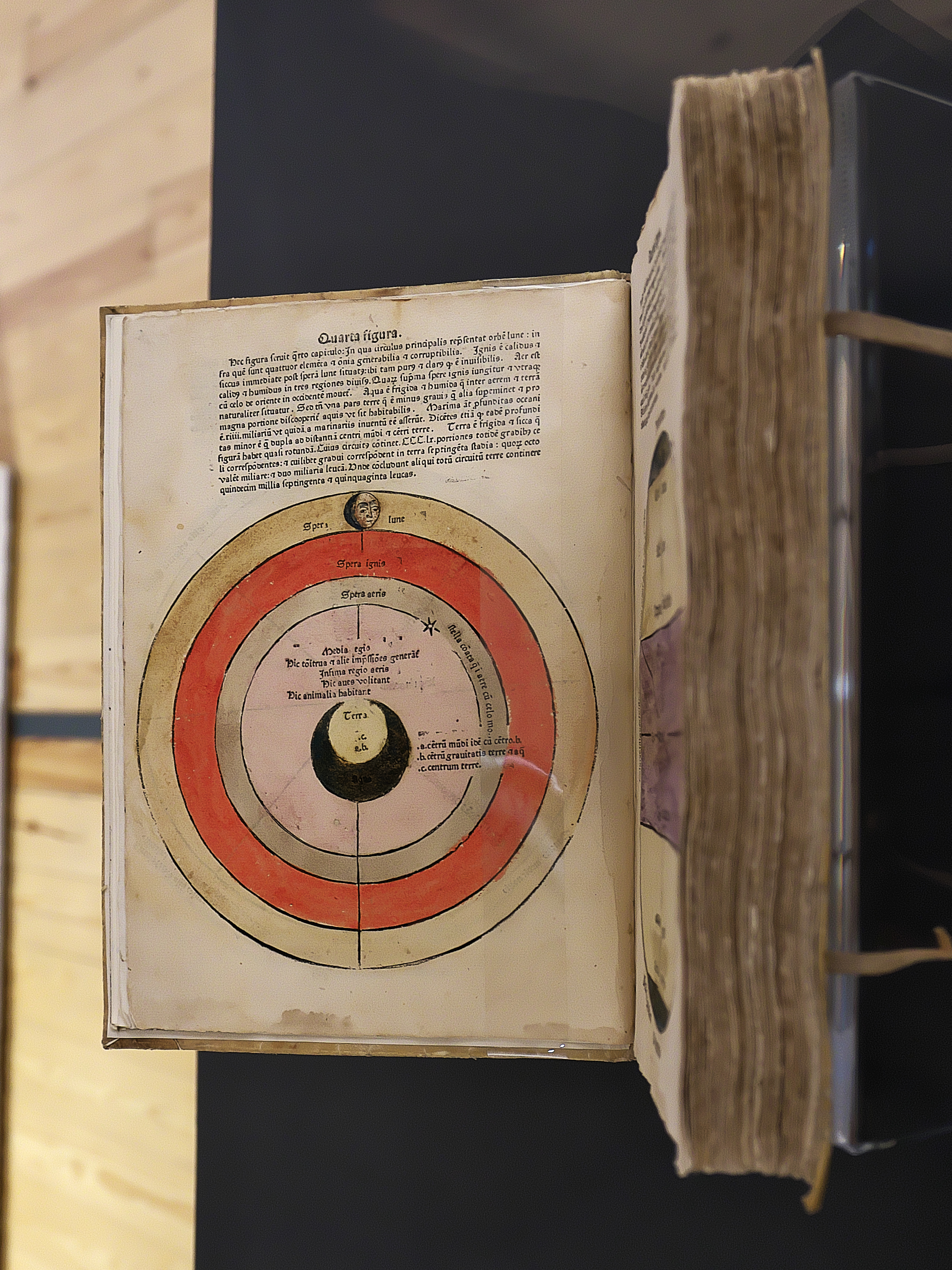
Edition of Pierre d'Ailly's Tractatus de Imagine Mundi published by Johannes de Westfalia in Leuven (ca. 1483)

D'Ailly wrote extensively on the Schism, reform, astrology and other topics. His ideas on the powers of the college of cardinals and the infallibility of the general council were very influential. D'Ailly's Imago Mundi (1410), a work of cosmography, influenced Christopher Columbus in his estimates of the size of the world. Many questions in science and astrology, such as calendar reform, attracted his attention. His views on astrology, expressed in several works, attempted to balance divine omniscience and human free will. D'Ailly's writings on the Schism put the crisis and the need for reform into an apocalyptic context. His astrology also was tied to the Schism, attempting to determine whether the division of the church was a sign of the coming of the Antichrist. His works began appearing in print before the end of the fifteenth century.

== Legacy ==
In The Eighteenth Brumaire of Louis Napoleon, Karl Marx falsely claimed that d'Ailly had told advocates of ethical reform at the Council of Constance, "Only the devil in person can still save the Catholic Church, and you ask for angels."

The crater Aliacensis on the Moon is named after him.

== Works and translations ==
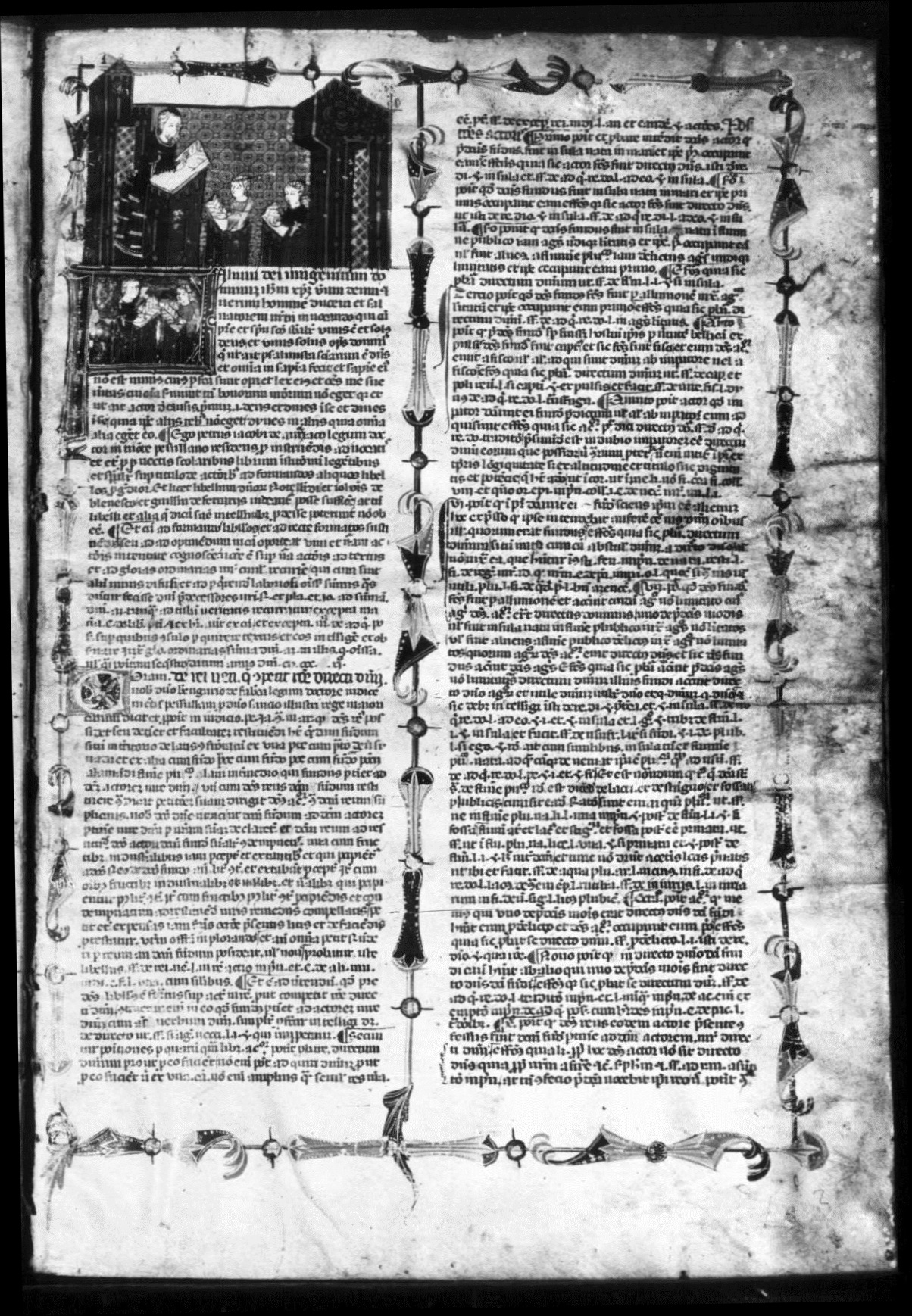
Lectura ad formandos libellos, Manuscript. Toledo Cathedral Library.

- Quaestiones super libros Sententiarum (1376–1377), anastatic reprint of the edition of 1490: Frankfurt-am-Mein: Minerva, 1968.
- Petrus de Alliaco Questiones super primum, tertium et quartum librum Sententiarum. I: Principia et questio circa Prologum, cura et studio Monica Brinzei, Turnhout: Brepols, 2013.
- Ymago Mundi de Pierre d'Ailly, Edmond Buron (ed.), Paris: Maisonneuve Frères, 1930, 3 vols., vol. 1 online here.
- De concordia astronomice veritatis et narrationis historice (1414).
- Tractatus de concordantia theologie et astronomie (1414).
- Destructiones modorum significandi, L. Kaczmarek (ed.), Amsterdam: G. B. Grüner, 1994.
- Tractatus de anima, O. Pluta (ed.), in Die philosophische Psychologie des Peter von Ailly, Amsterdam: G. B. Grüner, 1987.
- Tractatus super De consolatione philosophiae, M. Chappuis (ed.), Amsterdam: G. B. Grüner, 1988.
- Conceptus et insolubilia Paris, c. 1495.
- Concepts and Insolubles: An Annotated Translation, Paul Vincent Spade (ed.), Dordrecht: Reidel, 1980.
- Destructions modorum significandi. Conceptus et insolubilia, Lyons c. 1490–1495.
- Tractatus exponibilium, Paris 1494.

=== Manuscripts ===
- Lectura ad formandos libellos (in Latin) (Toledo, Biblioteca de la Catedral de Toledo, Manuscritos ed.). pp. 40–10. 18th century AD

== See also ==
- Gregory of Rimini

== Bibliography ==
- Bernstein, Alan E. (1978). Pierre d'Ailly and the Blanchard affair: University and Chancellor of Paris at the Beginning of the Great Schism. Leiden: Brill.
- Guenée, Bernard (1991). Between Church and State: The Lives of Four French Prelates in the Late Middle Ages. Translated by Arthur Goldhammer. Chicago: University of Chicago Press.
- Ackerman Smoller, Laura (1994). History, Prophecy, and the Stars – The Christian Astrology of Pierre d'Ailly, 1350–1420. Princeton, NJ: Princeton University Press. ISBN 0-691-08788-1.
- Stump, Philip H. (1994). The Reforms of the Council of Constance (1414–1418). Leiden: Brill. ISBN 90-04-09930-1.
- Pascoe, Louis B. (2005). Church and Reform: Bishops, Theologians, and Canon Lawyers in the Thought of Pierre d'Ailly (1351–1420). Leiden: Brill. ISBN 978-90-04-14062-2.
- Bibliography cited:
  - Paul Tschackert, Peter von Ailli (Gotha, 1877)
  - Louis Salembier, Petrus de Alliaco (Lille, 1886)
  - Henry Denifle and Émile Chatelain, Chartularium Universitatis Parisiensis, t. III. (Paris, 1894)
  - Noël Valois, La France et le Grand Schisme d'Occident (Paris, 4 vols., 1896–1902)
  - Bibliothèque de l'École des chartes, vol. LXV., 1904, pp. 557–574.
