= Walter of Château-Thierry =

13th-century Bishop of Paris

Walter of Château-Thierry (died 1249) was a French theologian and scholastic philosopher. He became Bishop of Paris in the final year of his life.

He wrote on the various meanings of conscience. He was Chancellor of the University of Paris from 1246, and wrote critically of lazy students and money-minded teachers. His question on the office of preaching discusses the suitability of women, laymen, heretics, mendicants and sinners for preaching.
