= Claude D'Espence =

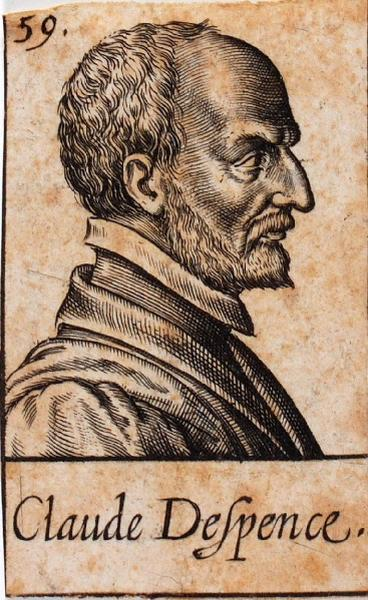

Claude D'Espence was a French theologian and diplomat, born in 1511 at Châlons-sur-Marne; died 5 October 1571, at Paris. He entered the Collège de Navarre in 1536, and later became the rector of the Sorbonne before he got his doctorate. He was involved with the Council of Trent and argued against the Protestant apologist Theodore Beza about the value of tradition.
