= Edmond Richer =

French theologian

Edmond Richer (French: [ʁiʃe]; 15 September 1559 – 29 November 1631) was a French theologian known for several works advocating the Gallican theory, that the pope's power was limited by authority of bishops, and by temporal governments. He was born in Chaource.

== Life ==
After schooling at the College of Cardinal Lemoine, Richer went on to study at the Sorbonne University. There he served as doctor of theology and trustee (syndic) of the Theological Faculty.

After the condemnation by the Parlement of Paris of Cardinal Bellarmine's treatise on the Temporal power of the Pope (1610), Richer developed, in his Libellus de Ecclesiastica et Politica Potestate (in French as De la puissance ecclésiastique et politique, Paris, 1611) the theory that the government of the Catholic Church should be aristocratical, not monarchical. Maria de' Medici, then regent in France, opposed Richer; and, when he had been censured by an assembly of bishops held at Sens, presided over by Cardinal du Perron, she had him deposed, and a new syndic elected (1612). Imprisoned, he retracted in 1629 his views, under pressure from Cardinal Richelieu.

== Works ==
His La première histoire en date de Jeanne d'Arc: histoire de la Pucelle d'Orléans (1625–1630) was not published until it appeared in two volumes in 1911.

In 1606 he edited Jean Gerson's works for publication, and with them other anti-papal writings.

In his Historia Conciliorum Generalium as with other works, Richer elaborated upon and defended Gallicanism, a theory that described the limits of papal power, and provided one of the early constructs of what later evolved as the concept of "separation of church and state". Richer's explanation and defense of the theory and practice of Gallicanism was an expression of French resistance to the power and reach of the Pope during that period.
