= John of Calore =

John of Calore was Chancellor of the University of Paris in the late 14th century. He was one of a number of theologians who was investigated for suspect teaching, based on statements he made during vespers. The inquiry concerning John of Calore, as a bachelor of theology, came in 1363. He was preceded as chancellor of the University of Paris by Grimerius Bonifacci.

According to a calendar of entries in the papal regesta, John of Calore was presented with a mandate to admit a friar preacher named John de Montesono in April 1376. De Montesono intended to lecture on the Four Books of Sentences at the schools of the order in Paris. He had lectured for many years in various places. After his talks on the Sentences, de Montesono was to be admitted to the faculty of the University of Paris, as a master of theology. Earlier he lectured at Oxford University and earned his degree as master there.
