= Gilles Deschamps =

Gilles Deschamps (also Gilles des Champs; Latinized as Aegidius Campensis) was a teacher and bishop of Coutances. He was created cardinal by Antipope John XXIII on 6 July 1411, and thus considered a pseudocardinal (Pierre d'Ailly was another such cardinal). Jean Gerson studied under both Deschamps and D'Ailly.

Deschamps was present at the trial of Joan of Arc (1431), where he "asked that the articles be read to counsel her, and a day assigned for her to appear, and that she be advised to reply."

== Sources ==
- Consistories
- The Avalon Project
