= André Duchesne =

French historian (1584–1640)

André Duchesne (French: [dyʃɛːn]; sometimes spelled Du Chesne, Latinized Andreas Chesneus, Andreas Quercetanus, or Andreas Querneus; May 1584 – 30 May 1640) was a French geographer and historian, generally styled the father of French history.

Duchesne was born in L'Île-Bouchard, then part of Touraine. He was educated at Loudun and afterwards at Paris. From his earliest years he devoted himself to historical and geographical research, and his first work, Egregiarum seu selectarum lectionum et antiquitatum liber, published in his eighteenth year, displayed great erudition. He enjoyed the patronage of Cardinal Richelieu, a native of the same district with himself, through whose influence he was appointed historiographer and geographer to the king.

He died in Paris in 1640, in consequence of having been run over by a carriage when on his way from the city to his country house at Verrières.

== Works ==
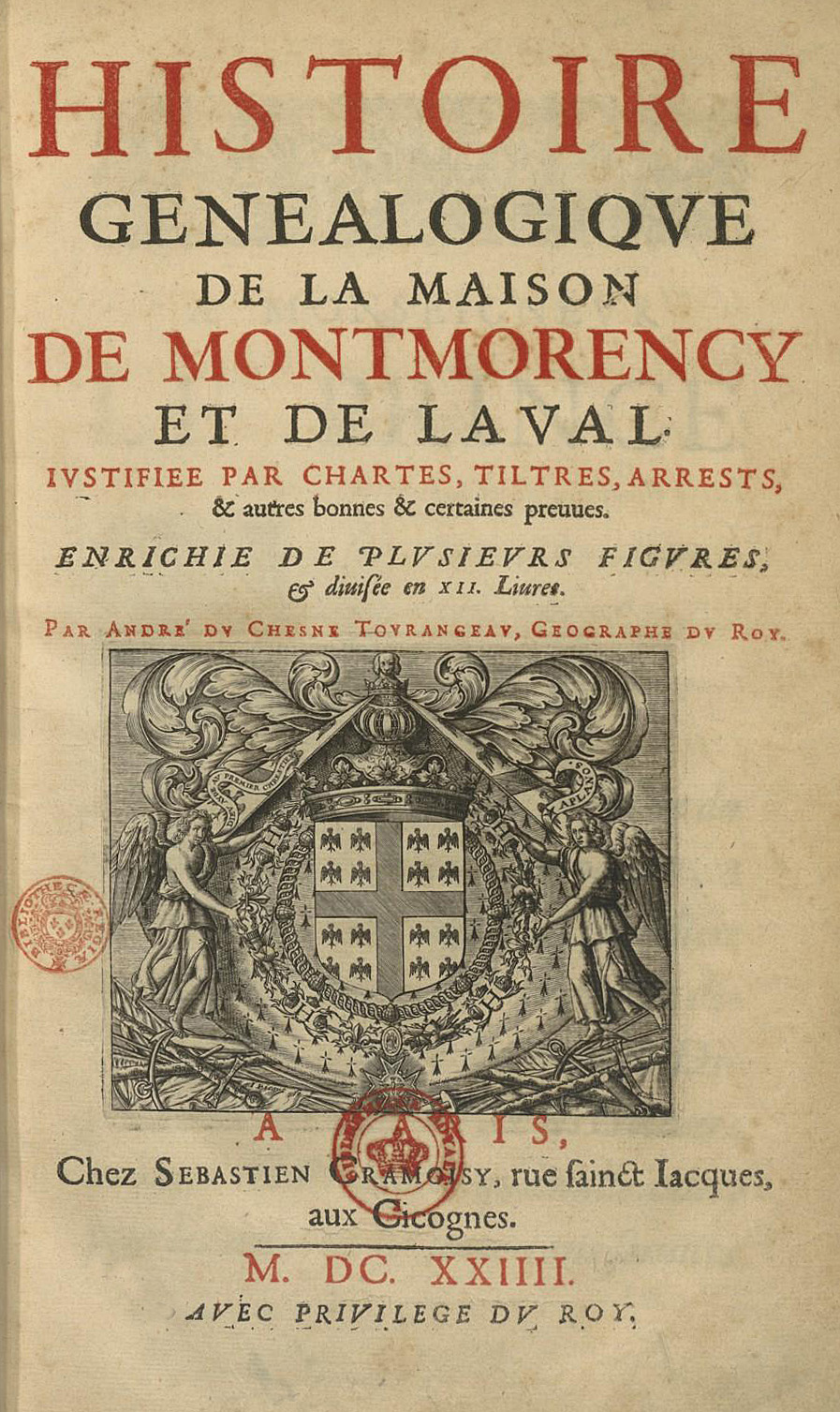
André Duchesne, Histoire généalogique de la maison de Montmorency et de Laval (1624)

Duchesne's works were very numerous and varied, and in addition to what he published, he left behind him more than 100 folio volumes of manuscript extracts now preserved in the Bibliothèque Nationale (L. Delisle, Le Cabinet des manuscrits de la Bibliothèque impériale, t. L, 333–334). Several of his larger works were continued by his only son François Duchesne (1616–1693), who succeeded him in the office of historiographer to the king.

The principal works of André Duchesne are Les Antiquités et recherches de la grandeur et majesté des rois de France (Paris, 1609), Les Antiquités et recherches des villes, châteaux, &c., de toute la France (Paris, 1609), Histoire d'Angleterre, d'Ecosse, et d'Irelande (Paris, 1614), Histoire des Papes jusqu'à Paul V (Paris, 1619), Histoire des rois, ducs, et comtes de Bourgogne (1619–1628, 2 vols. fol.), Historiae Normanorum scriptores antiqui (1619, fol., now the only source for some of the texts), and his Historiae Francorum scriptores (5 vols. fol., 1636–1649).

This last was intended to comprise 24 volumes, and to contain the narrative sources for French history in the Middle Ages; only two volumes were published by the author, his son François published three more, and the work remained unfinished. Besides these Duchesne published a great number of genealogical histories of illustrious families, of which the best is that of the house of Montmorency. His Histoire des cardinaux francais (2 vols. 101. 1660–1666) and Histoire des chanceliers et gardes des sceaux de France (1630) were published by his son François. André also published a translation of the Satires of Juvenal, and editions of the works of Alcuin, Abelard, Alain Chartier and Étienne Pasquier.

- Les Antiquités et recherches de la grandeur et majesté des rois de France (Paris, 1609)
- Les Antiquités et recherches des villes, châteaux, &c., de toute la France (Paris, 1609)
- Histoire d'Angleterre, d'Écosse, et d'Irlande (Paris, 1614)
- Bibliothèque des auteurs qui ont écrit l'histoire et la topographie de la France, 1618
- Histoire des Papes jusqu'à Paul V (Paris, 1619)
- Histoire des rois, ducs, et comtes de Bourgogne (1619–1628, 2 volumes fol.)
- Grande Histoire de la Maison de Vergy, (Paris, 1625)
- Annales Francorum Mettenses (Paris, 1626) also known as Annals of Metz.
- Historiae Normanorum scriptores antiqui (1619)
- Histoire de la Maison de Chastillon sur Marne, Paris, 1621
- Historiae Francorum scriptores (5 volumes fol., 1636–1649)
