= Castres Cathedral =

Church in Languedoc, France

Coordinates: 43°36′15″N 2°14′30″E

Castres Cathedral Cathédrale Saint-Benoît de Castres
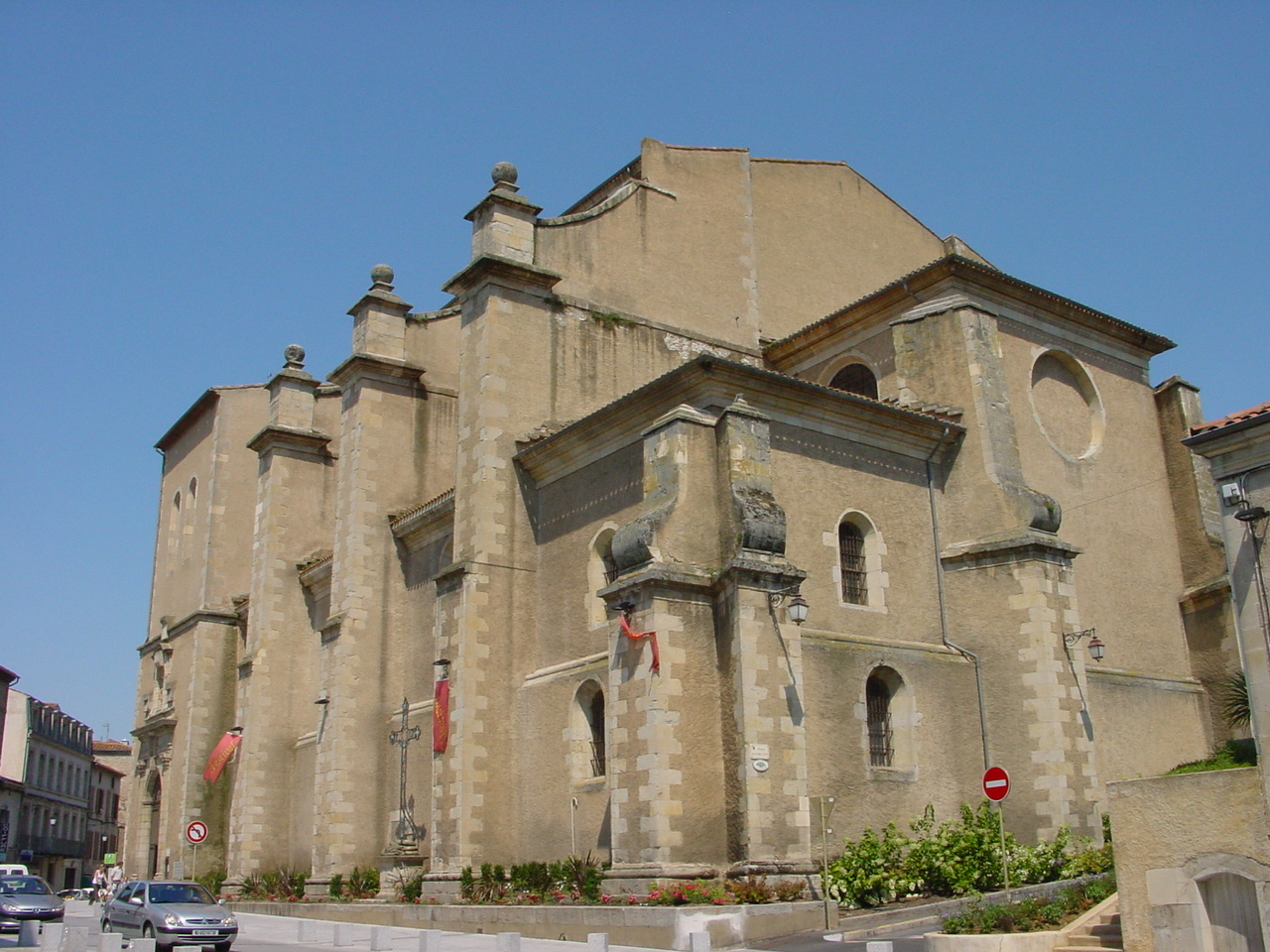
- Castres Cathedral

Religion
- Affiliation: Roman Catholic Church
- Province: Bishop of Castres
- Region: Languedoc
- Rite: Roman Rite
- Ecclesiastical or organisational status: Cathedral
- Status: Active

Location
- Location: Castres, France
- Interactive map of Castres Cathedral; Cathédrale Saint-Benoît de Castres

Architecture
- Type: church
- Groundbreaking: 14th century
- Completed: 17th century

Castres Cathedral (French: Cathédrale Saint-Benoît de Castres), now the Roman Catholic church of Saint Benoît (Saint Benedict), is an historical religious building in Castres, Languedoc, France. Now a parish church, it was formerly the seat of the bishop of Castres. The diocese was not restored after the French Revolution but was added by the Concordat of 1801 to the Archdiocese of Albi.

The first cathedral was originally the church of the Benedictine Bellecelle Abbey, which was elevated to be the episcopal seat of the diocese of Castres, newly created in 1317, along with a number of other dioceses created in the region after the suppression of the Albigensians. It was destroyed by the Huguenots in the 1570s, apart from the bell tower, which survives. After two reconstructions were started and demolished uncompleted during the 17th century, the present building was begun in 1678 and brought to a point in the early 18th century where it was possible to consecrate the cathedral and put it to use, although the building has never been completed.

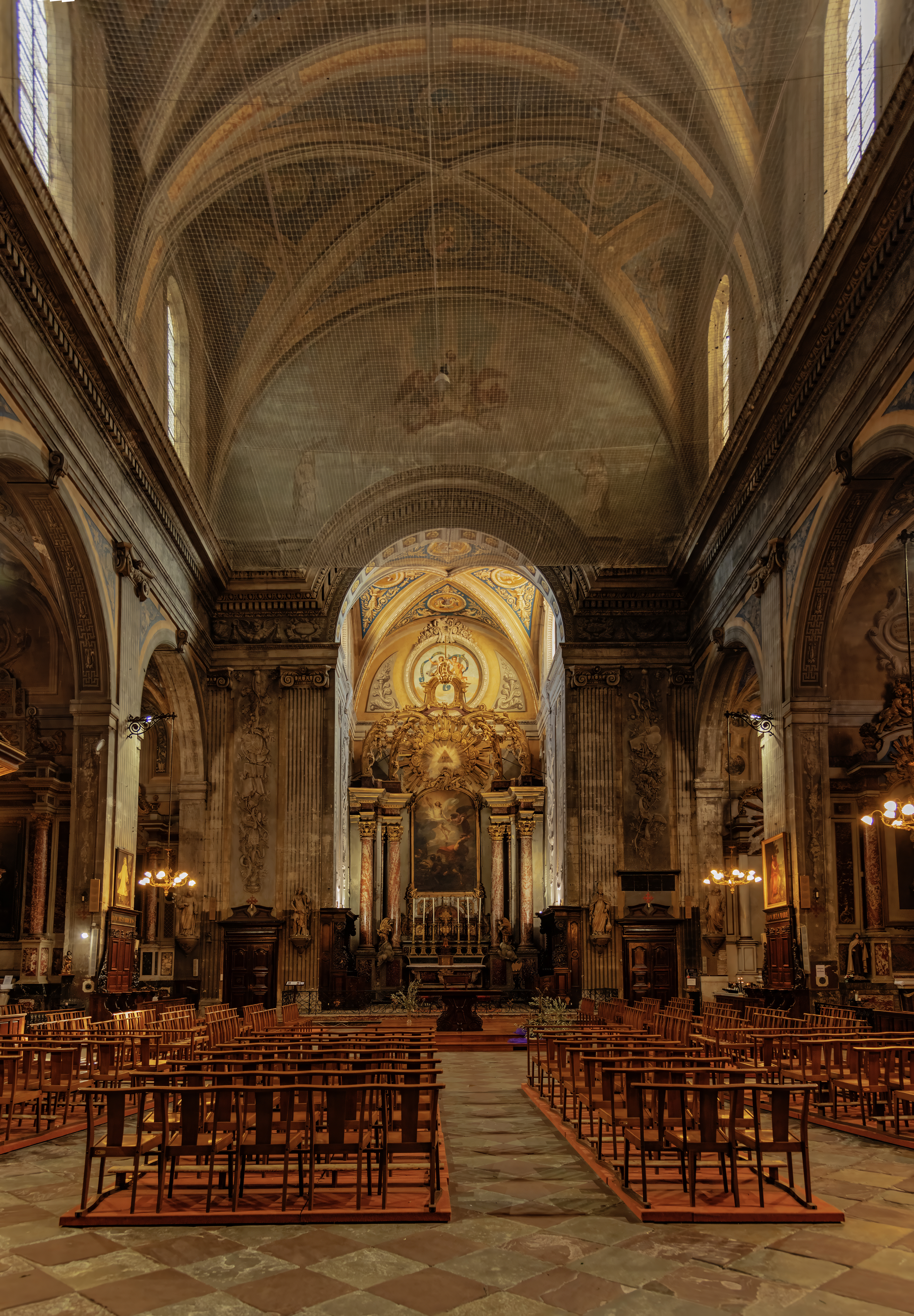
The nave and the choir

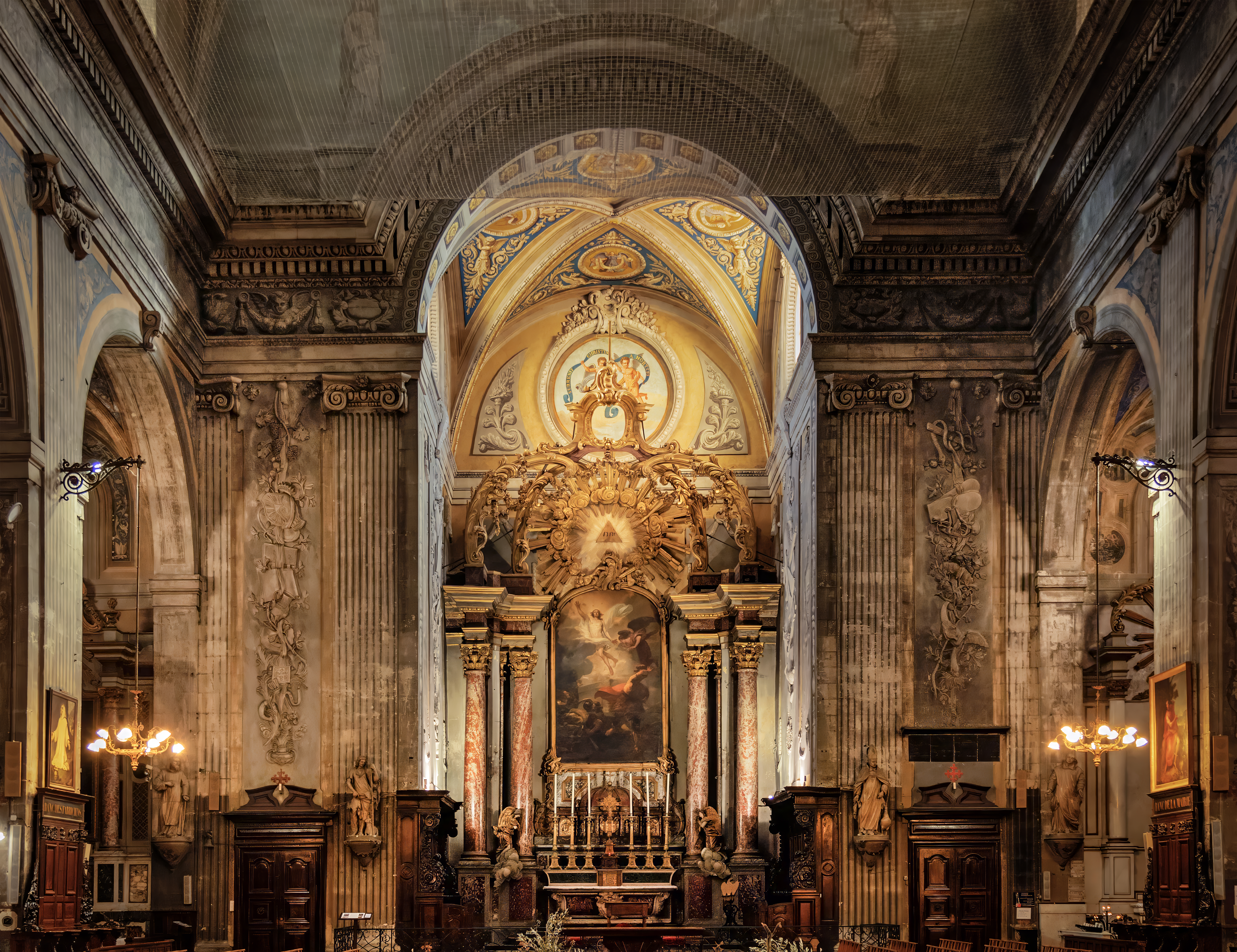
The choir

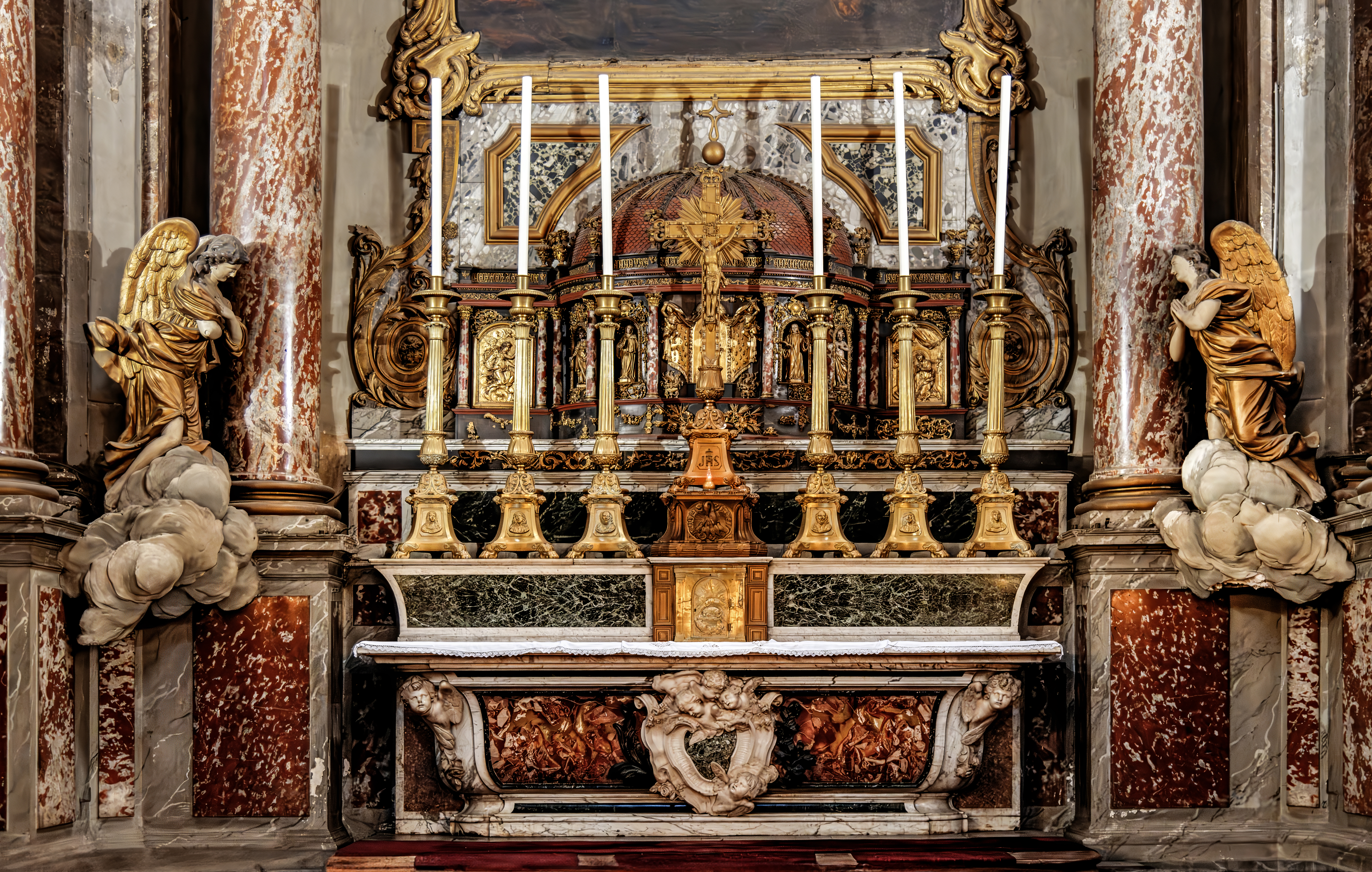
The high altar with canopy, supported by Caunes marble columns; work of E. Lagon, Castres architect and sculptor

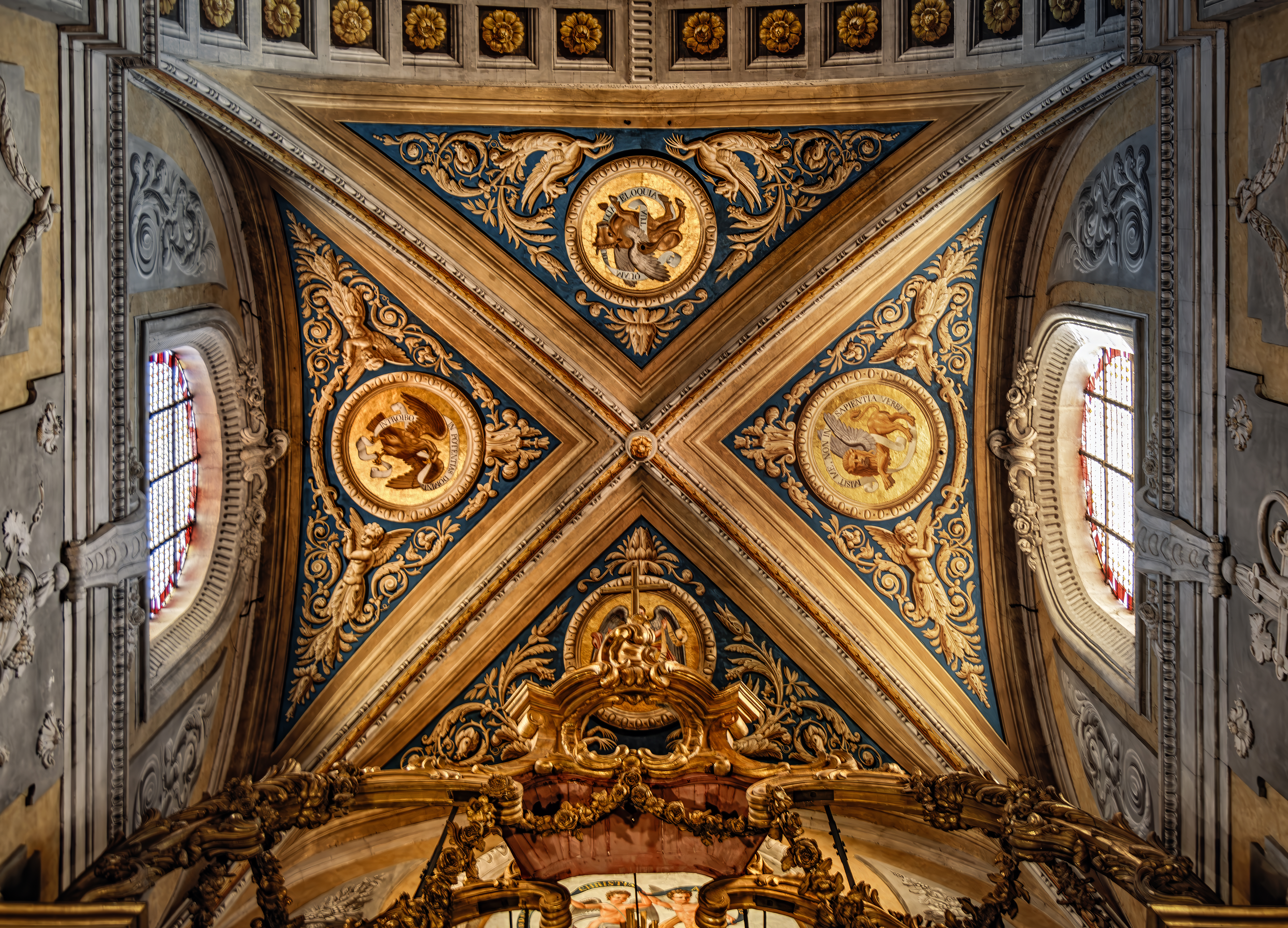
Choir ceiling.

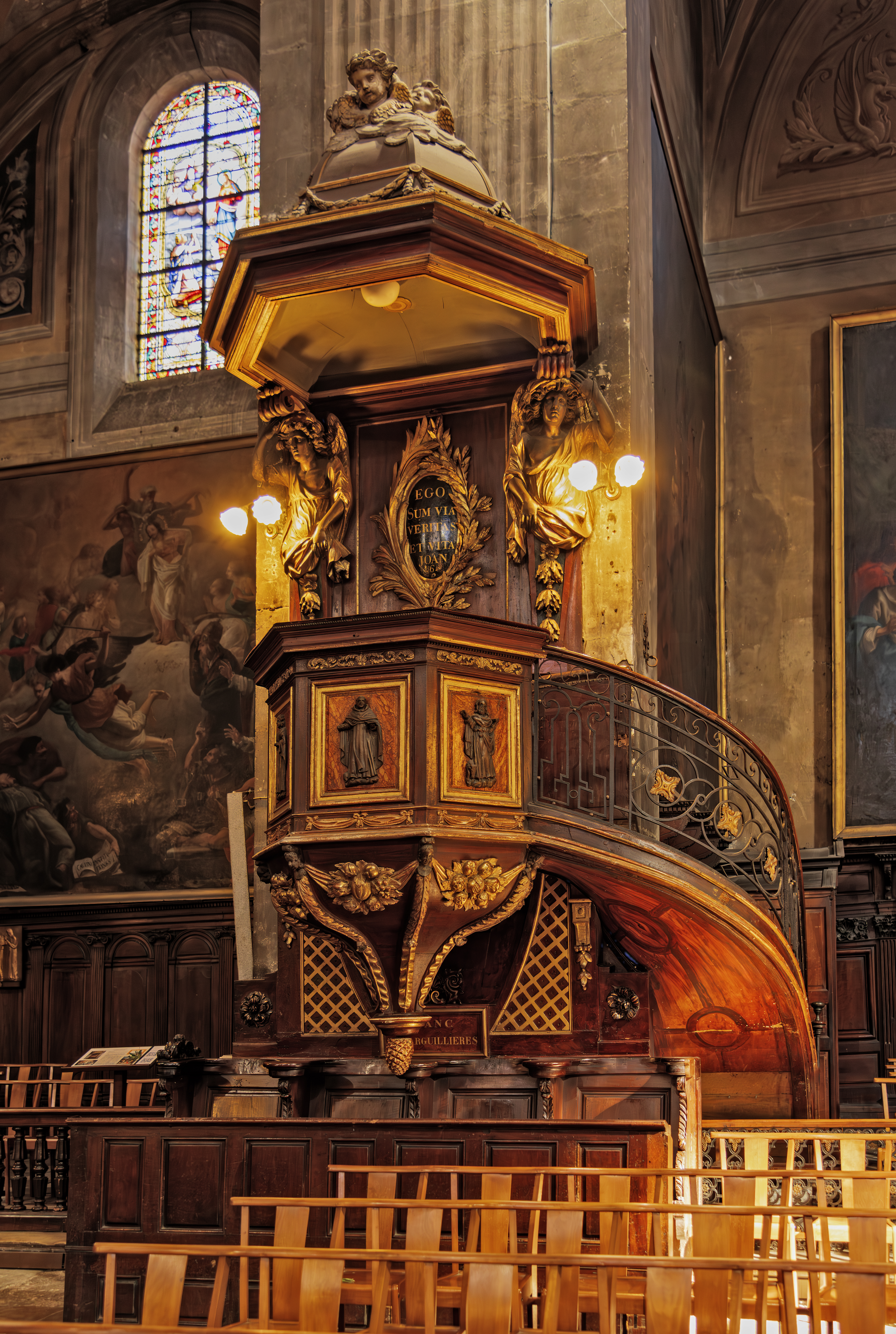
Baroque pulpit, commissioned in 1692

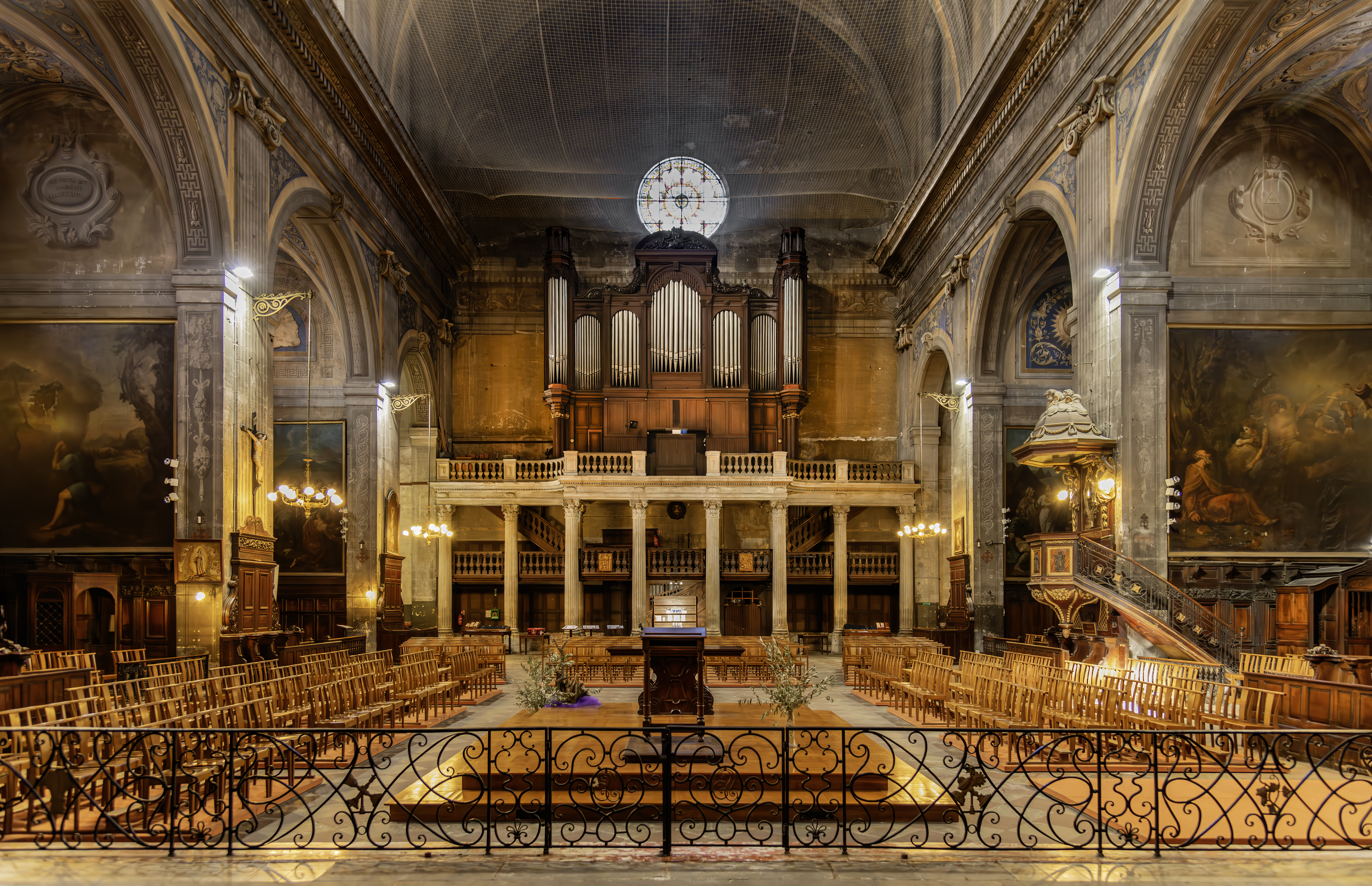
The nave seen from the choir.
