= Robert Ciboule =

French Roman Catholic theologian and moralist

Robert Ciboule (died 1458) was a French Roman Catholic theologian and moralist.
