= Paul Tschackert =

German Protestant theologian and church historian

Paul Tschackert (10 January 1848 – 7 July 1911) was a German Protestant theologian and church historian born in Freystadt, Silesia. He is largely remembered for studies involving the history of the Protestant Reformation.

Tschackert studied history, theology and philosophy at the University of Halle, and in 1873 continued his education at the University of Göttingen. In 1875, he earned his doctorate at the University of Breslau with his thesis on theologian Pierre d'Ailly (1351–1420). In 1877 he became an associate professor at Halle, afterwards serving as a professor at the universities of Königsberg (from 1884) and Göttingen (from 1890).

Tschackert died in Göttingen.

== Selected writings ==
- Anna Maria von Schürmann, der Stern von Utrecht, die Jüngerin Labadie's; ein Bild aus der Kulturgeschichte des 17. Jahrhunderts. Vortrag, 1876 – Anna Maria van Schurman, "the star of Utrecht", the disciple of Labadie; a picture of cultural history in the 17th Century; Lecture.
- Peter von Ailli, 1877 – Petrus de Alliaco.
- Evangelische Polemik gegen die römische Kirche, 1885 – Protestant polemic against the Roman church.
- Urkundenbuch zur Reformationsgeschichte des Herzogthums Preussen, 1890 ff. – Deed book of Reformation history involving the Duchy of Prussia.
- Die Entstehung der lutherischen und der reformierten Kirchenlehre samt ihren innerprotestantischen Gegensätzen, 1910 – The emergence of the Lutheran and Reformed church doctrines involving its inner-Protestant conflicts.

He was the author of many biographies in the Allgemeine Deutsche Biographie.
