= College of Navarre =

College of the University of Paris

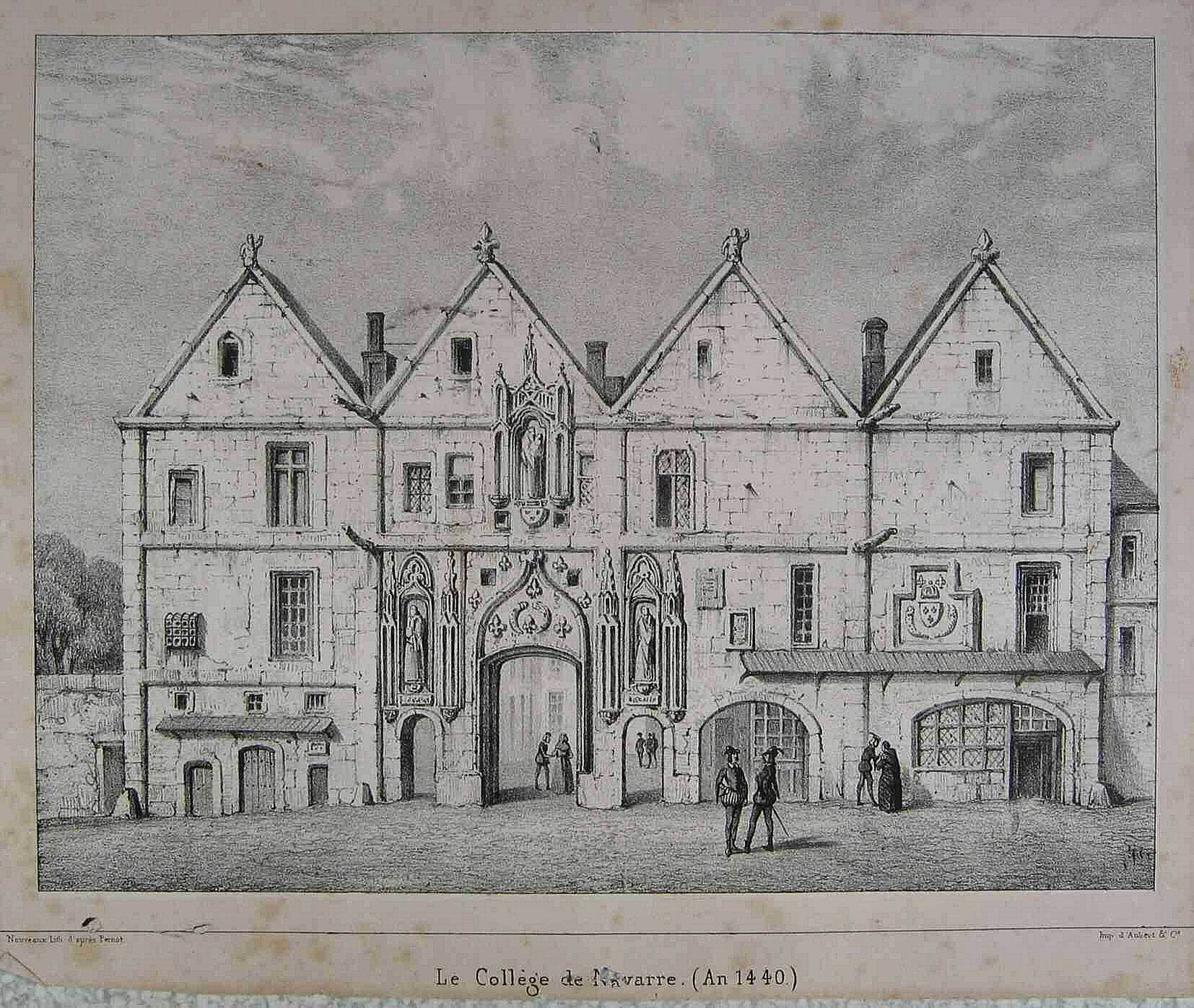
College of Navarre as it appeared in 1440 (19th-century engraving)

The College of Navarre (French: Collège de Navarre, pronounced [kɔlɛʒ də navaʁ]) was one of the colleges of the historic University of Paris. It rivaled the Sorbonne and was renowned for its library.

== History ==
The college was founded by Queen Joan I of Navarre in 1305, who provided for three departments, the arts with 20 students, philosophy with 30 and theology with 20 students.

The queen bequeathed part of her fine hôtel de Navarre in rue Saint André des Arts, together with lands generated rents of 2000 livres p.a. in her counties of Champagne and Brie. Her trustees decided to sell the Paris property and acquire an ample plot on the Montagne Sainte-Geneviève (rue de la Montagne-Sainte-Geneviève / rue Descartes), right in the Latin Quarter, and build the college anew. The first stone, laid 12 April 1309, was for the college chapel.

Provision was made also for the scholars' support, 4 Paris sous weekly for the artists, 6 for the logicians and 8 for the theologians. These allowances were to continue until the graduates held benefices of the value respectively of 30, 40 and 60 livres. The regulations allowed the theological students a fire, daily, from November to March after dinner and supper for one half-hour. The luxury of benches was forbidden by a commission appointed by Urban V in 1366. On the festival days, the theologians were expected to deliver a collation to their fellow-students of the three classes. The rector at the head of the college, originally appointed by the faculty of the university, was now appointed by the king's confessor. The students wore a special dress and the tonsure and ate in common.

Classes bore little resemblance to today's universities. Subjects were included that are not taught today, such as rhetoric in its classical meaning. The students were required to speak and write only in Latin and all subjects had to be learned by rote. Only after graduation were students allowed to write using their own words or discuss the subjects. At least one of the rectors, Claude D'Espence became rector before he obtained his doctorate.

The College was dissolved at the time of the French Revolution, its library dispersed and its archives lost. Its buildings were assigned to the École polytechnique by Napoleon in 1805.

== Notable students or teachers ==
- Pierre d'Ailly
- François d'Amboise
- Jacques d'Amboise
- Jacques-Bénigne Bossuet
- Jean Buridan
- Nicolas de Caritat, marquis de Condorcet
- André Chénier
- Thomas Dempster
- Oronce Finé
- William Fowler
- Jean de Gerson
- Charles-François Lebrun, duc de Plaisance
- Nicole Oresme
- Jean-Antoine Nollet, appointed by the king to a professorship of experimental physics (the first in France) at the college in 1753.
- Armand Jean du Plessis, duc de Richelieu
- Pierre de Ronsard
- Octavien de Saint-Gelais
- George Stewart, 9th Seigneur d'Aubigny
- François Villon
- Francisco de Jasso y Azpilicueta, St Francis Xavier
- Pierre de Fermat
