= François Duchesne =

French historian

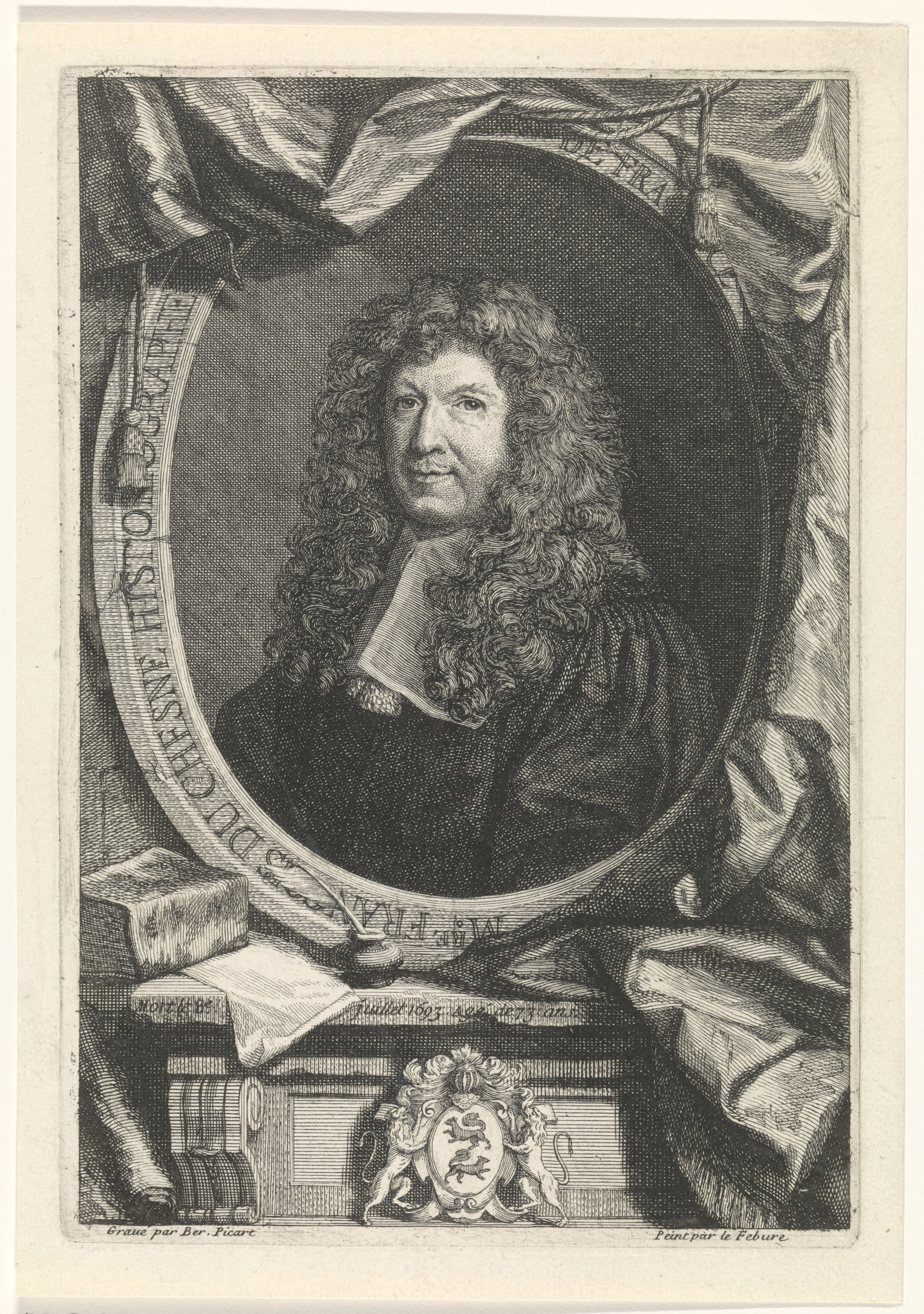

François Duchesne (1616–1693) was a French historian.

== Biography ==
François Duchesne, the son of the historian André Duchesne, was born in Paris in 1616. He "cultivated history with a zeal" and obtained the title of historiographer. He died in 1693.

== Works ==
Duchesne wrote:

- History of the Chancellors of France (1680)

Duchesne published several editions of his father's works including:

- Antiquies of the Cities and Castles of France (1647),
- The History of the Poses (1653).

== Bibliography ==
- Thomas, Joseph (1892), Universal pronouncing dictionary of biography and mythology (Aa, van der – Hyperius), vol. 1, Philadelphia: J.B. Lippincott, p. 797
