= John of Montson =

Aragonese Dominican theologian and controversialist

John of Montson (also known as Juan de Monzón or Monzon de Montesono; born at Monzón, Spain; c. 1340 – after 1412) was an Aragonese Dominican theologian and controversialist. His refusal to tolerate other beliefs regarding the Immaculate Conception resulted in his condemnation and clandestine exile to Spain.

== Biography ==
Montson joined the Dominicans probably in Valencia. In 1383, he was lecturing on theology at Valencia Cathedral. Thence he went to Paris, taught in the convent of St. James there, and obtained the mastership of theology in 1387.

In that same year, Montson became embroiled in a conflict between the Dominican and Franciscan orders over the Immaculate Conception, not yet defined as a doctrine of the Catholic Church. Taking the Dominican side, Montson declared in his lectures that the Immaculate Conception was a heresy. The faculty of the University of Paris, which maintained a neutral position on the conflict, demanded that he retract the claim that the opposing opinion was heretical. When Montson refused, the faculty escalated the issue to the bishop of Paris, Pierre d'Orgemont, who sided with the faculty and excommunicated Montson. Montson and the Dominicans appealed the decision to Antipope Clement VII.

Later, foreseeing that the case was going against him, Montson, despite the command under pain of excommunication to remain at Avignon, secretly withdrew into Aragon, then went to Sicily, changing his allegiance to Pope Urban VI, Clement's rival. There and in Spain, whither he afterwards returned, he filled several important positions. In 1412, Alfonso, Duke of Gandia, chose him as head of a legation sent to defend his claim to the crown of Aragon.

== Works ==
Besides four works against Clement's claim as pope, he wrote: "Tractatus de Conceptione B. Virginis", a number of sermons, and various opuscula in the vernacular.
