= De viris illustribus (Petrarch) =

Collection of biographies by Francesco Petrarca

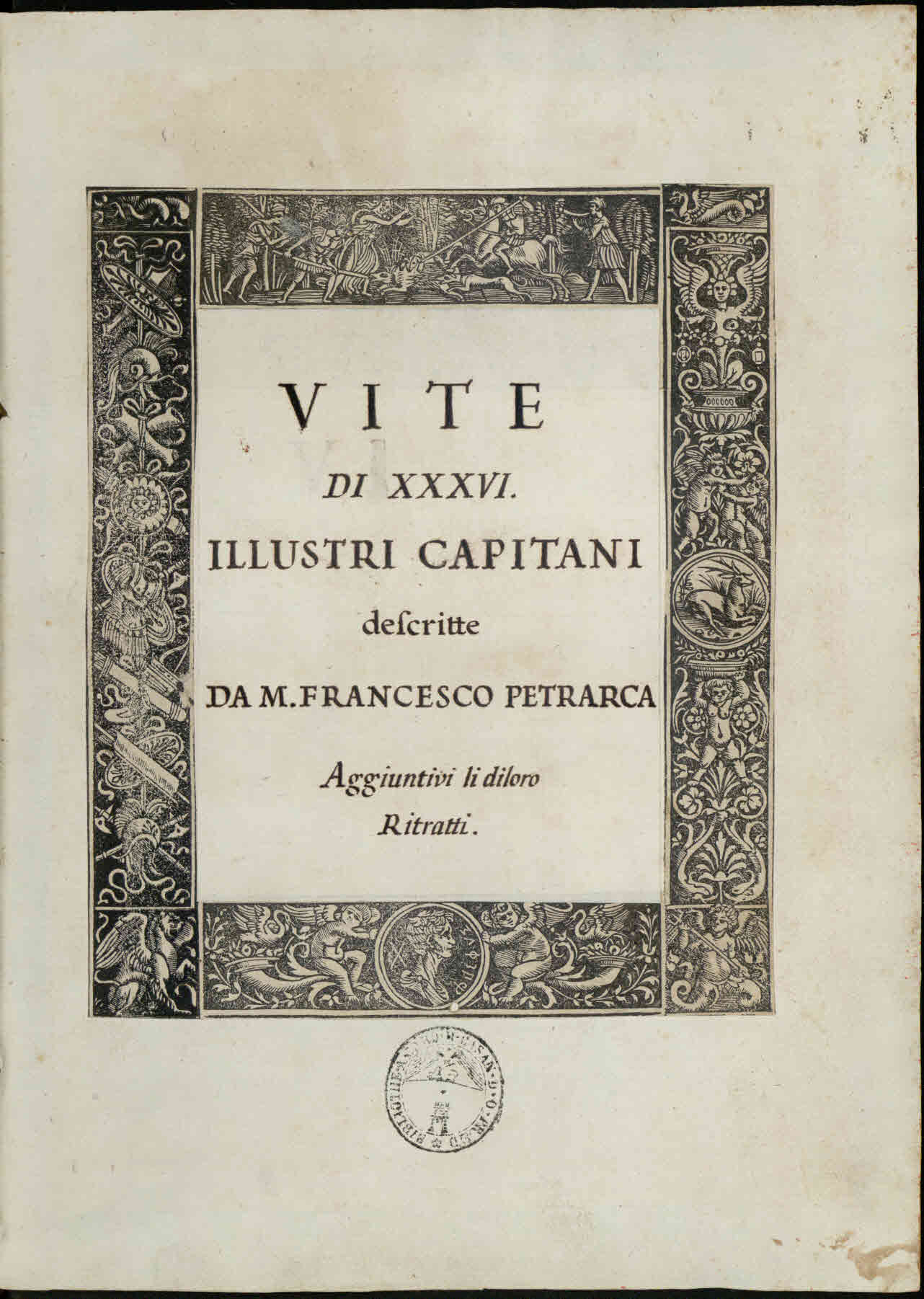
De viris illustribus, 1476

De viris illustribus (English: On Illustrious Men) is an unfinished collection of biographies, written in Latin, by the 14th-century Italian author Francesco Petrarca. These biographies are a set of Lives similar in idea to Plutarch's Parallel Lives. The works were unfinished. However he was famous enough for these and other works to receive two invitations to be crowned poet laureate. He received these invitations on exactly the same day, April 8, 1341, one being from the Paris University and the other from the Roman Senate. He accepted the Roman invitation.

It is composed of two books:

- Liber I includes 24 to 36 moral biographies (depending on version) of heroes of Greek and Roman antiquity (much like Polybius The Histories and Plutarch's figures in his Lives).
- Liber II includes 12 moral biographies of Biblical and mythical figures (much like that found in the Hebrew Bible and Greek mythology).

There is an English translation of the prefaces to De viris illustribus.

== Liber I ==
These are 36 biographies of Petrarch's subjects starting with Romulus, the mythological founder of Rome, and going through Trajan. All of these are mentioned in Petrarch's epic poem Africa. He revised the list many times over the years in different "plans." Some "Illustrious Romans" ended with Titus. Another plan of "Illustrious Romans" added Julius Caesar as the twenty-fourth biography. The adjacent 1476 Table of Contents introduction is old Italian and says something to the effect: Repository of the book here present where will be shown the chapters on 36 "illustrious men" whose deeds are extensively described by the honorable poet, Sir Francesco Petrarca, and beginning as appears below. Listed among these are Titus, Pompey, Scipio Africanus and Julius Caesar.

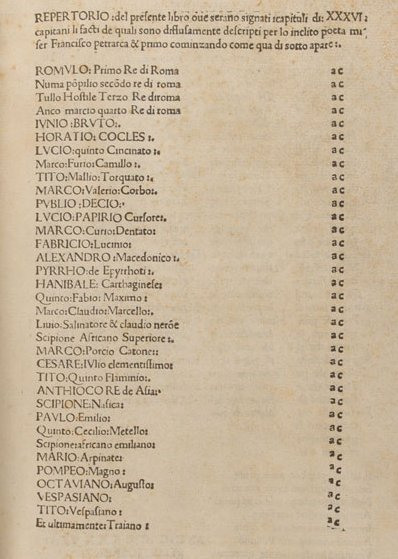
1476 table of contents of Petrarch's Illustrious Romans, beginning with Romulus and ending with Trajan.

Subjects of De Viris Illustribus in Latin	Subjects of De Viris Illustribus appearing in Africa	Page references in Africa translation
De Romulo primo Romanorum rege	Romulus	19, 20, 80, 116, 144, 232, 253, 270
De Numa Pompilio secundo Romanorum rege	Numa Pompilius	244
De Tullo Hostilio tertio Romanorum rege	Tullus Hostilius	245
De Anco Martio quarto Romanorum rege	Ancus Marcius	245
De Iunio Bruto primo Romanorum consule	Lucius Junius Brutus	66, 67, 68, 254, 269
De Horatio Cocle	Horatius Cocles	214, 269
De Lucio Quintio Cincinnato	Cincinnatus	253
De Marco Furio Camillo	Marcus Furius Camillus	213, 246, 247, 259
De Tito Manlio Torquato	Titus Manlius Torquatus	248
De Marco Valerio Corvo	Marcus Valerius Corvus	253
De Publio Decio	Publius Decius Mus	253
De Lucio Papirio Cursore	Lucius Papirius Cursor	253
De Marco Curio Dentato	Curius Dentatus	253
De Fabritio Lucinio	Gaius Fabricius Luscinus	253, 270
De Alexandro Macedone	Alexander III of Macedon	27, 185, 187, 252, 266, 267, 271
De Pyrro Epyrotarum rege	Pyrrhus of Epirus	152, 185, 190, 253, 264
De Hanibale Carthaginensium duce	Hannibal of Carthage	123-129, 131-134, 142-145, 149-154
De Quinto Fabio Maximo Cuntatore	Quintus Fabius Maximus Cunctator ("the Delayer")	14, 15, 144, 217, 244, 255, 263
De Marco Claudio Marcello	De Marcus Claudius Marcellus	14, 130, 147, 244, 253, 261
De Claudio Nero	Gaius Claudius Nero	200-204, 246, 260, 268
De Livio Salinatore	Marcus Livius Salinator	135
De Publio Cornelio Scipione Africano Maiore	Publius Cornelius Scipio Africanus	134-138, 163-164, 182, 189, 204
De Marco Portio Catone Censorio	Cato the Elder	28, 59, 246, 253
Cesare Iulio clementissimo	Julius Caesar	242, 246, 247
Tito Quinto Flamminio	Titus Quinctius Flamininus	248
Anthioco re de Asia	Antiochus XIII Asiaticus	27, 193, 245, 246, 259, 267
Scipione Nasica	Publius Cornelius Scipio Nasica	246
Paulo Emilio	Lucius Aemilius Paullus Macedonicus	14, 244, 265
Quinto Cecilo Metello	Quintus Caecilius Metellus	135, 246, 254, 262
Scipione Africano Emilianae	Scipio Aemilianus	204, 246, 249, 269
Mario Arpinate	Gaius Marius	213, 246, 247, 259
Pompeo Magno	Pompey	246, 247
Octaviano Augusto	Augustus	136, 195, 197
Vespasiano	Vespasian	247
Tito Vespasiano	Titus	248
Traiano	Trajan	248

== Liber II ==
These are the subjects of Petrarch's 12 biographies starting with the first person of the Bible. Petrarch influenced Giovanni Boccaccio Lives On Famous Women of 106 biographies which starts with the first woman of the Bible. Below is the first person of the Bible and above in Liber I is the first mythical figures that started Rome.

- Adam
- Noah
- Nimrod
- Ninus
- Semiramis
- Abraham
- Isaac
- Jacob
- Joseph
- Moses
- Jason
- Hercules

== Composition ==
Petrarch was working on De viris illustribus at the same time he was working on his epic poem Africa with Scipio Africanus being the center figure for both. The Africa was conceived as a poetic parallel of De Viris Illustribus. Petrarch conceived his first plan for De viris illustribus of biographies of illustrious men of Jewish, oriental, Greek and Roman famous figures in 1337-38. He wrote up his list of "Illustrious Men" from Adam to Hercules and Romulus to Titus in 1337-38 about the same time as he was writing up the Africa. Petrarch's earliest reference to writing a series of biographies of Lives can be found in the third book of his work Secretum which was originally written up around 1337. St. Augustine speaks to Petrarch

...thus, putting your hand to even greater works, you have tied yourself to a book of histories from the time of king Romulus to the emperor Titus, a task of immense duration and of very great labor.

Petrarch went from these Lives of "Illustrious Men" into his work on the Africa using the research of De viris illustribus as the basis. Petrarch was preoccupied with this idea of a series of biographies of Lives of ancient heroes of generals and statesmen for almost forty years. There were several plans of De viris illustribus. In 1348-49 Petrarch made a larger version of Lives. Petrarch writes a letter to Luca Cristiani in 1349 concerning these Lives for De viris illustribus that he was doing in the valley at Vaucluse in France;

...no place had afforded me more leisure or more exciting stimulation: that solitude has permitted me to collect in one scheme outstanding men from all lands and from all ages.

Petrarch mentions in letters from Vaucluse around 1350 that he was working on a De viris illustribus that was wholly committed to those who were illustrious "from every country" and that he was "bringing together illustrious men from all lands and centuries." This is known to scholars as an "all-ages" plan. Petrarch added the "bio" of Julius Caesar, De gestis Cesaris ("On the Deeds of Caesar"), later as the twenty-fourth and last character of the Roman version finished about 1364 (fourteenth reigning year of John the Good) as an afterthought to his original "Famous Men." He wanted to depict events that were controlled by the Roman leaders, not events that happened by luck or fortune. He wanted to be a critical historian and convey these illustrious men in dignity. For these reasons he is considered the first historian of the Renaissance.

== Plans ==
Petrarch worked on various "plans" and versions of De viris illustribus. He was not only influenced by ancient historians like Livy and Valerius Maximus, but by other historians of his time period that were working on similar ideas. In the early part of the fourteenth century in northern Italy it was fairly commonplace among historians to write a series of biographies on famous men. A friend of Petrarch's, Giovanni Colonna, authorized his version of a De viris illustribus before he left Avignon for Rome in 1338. Another of Petrarch's friends, Guglielmo Pastrengo, had two works on lives of famous men, De viris illustribus and De originibus. Petrarch's friend, Pastrengo, also wrote a work on De viris illustribus and De originibus. The previous historian's works of De originibus are about the origins and definitions of geographical sites, peoples, and certain stone structures.

Historian Kohl says that there was at least three different "plans" that Petrarch devised for his De viris illustribus. The first plan, prior to his famous epic poem Africa, was written around 1337. It is known as the "republican Rome" plan. The second plan started in 1350 entered in Christian figures, similar in style to Jerome's De viris illustribus and his "Church Fathers." It was finished around 1351-53 and called the "all-ages" plan. Petrarch enjoyed both the writings of ancient writers before the Christian era for their history of famous men and that of Jerome's Latin "Church Fathers" for their Christian viewpoints. He viewed both as a world being in decline. The third plan was a series of biographies of Romulus to Trajan and is referred to as "ancient secular heroes." In this plan most biographies are considered lengthy, while others are considered massive. For example, the biography of Cornelius Scipio is 20,000 words and that of the newly entered Julius Caesar is 70,000 words long. Petrarch's characters were of military heroes and civic leaders, while other authors wrote on most any notable men. Petrarch's overall goal attitude was to convey antiquity and history balanced with the Christian tradition. He presented a moral aim of doing the right thing compared to actions of the past. He saw Jerome's "Church Fathers" as presenting moral virtues through Christian traditional viewpoints. He felt that by close examination of the ancient Roman leaders the reader could gain their virtues.

AIM	PURPOSE	SOURCE
morals	virtues	Livy, Jerome
aesthetic	dignity	Valerius Maximus, Cicero
critical	truth	Cicero

Petrarch intended his work to be instructional for teaching moral righteousness. He found comfort in the misfortunes of Old Testament figures such as Jacob and Joseph. He showed to his fourteenth century readers the lessons of common sense morality that could be learned from the ancient Roman leaders and Old Testament figures. He stressed these points over that of victories on the battlegrounds, which he considered as mere luck and incompetence of the enemies. He saw his duty of his work to be "describing illustrious men, not lucky ones."
