= Ser Petracco =

Italian merchant (1267–1326)

- Born: Pietro di Parenzo di Garzo; 1267; Arezzo
- Died: 1326 (aged 58–59); Avignon, County of Provence
- Occupation: Notary
- Spouse(s): Eletta Canigiani (m. 1302–1319; her death); Niccolosa di Vanni Sigoli
- Children: 3, including Petrarch

Ser Petracco (born Pietro di Parenzo di Garzo; 1267–1326) was the father to the Italian poet Francesco Petrarca.

== Biography ==
His father was Ser Parenzo, son of Ser Garzo who reputedly lived to be 100. They all were notaries, the same office that Ser Petracco held in Florence. The family did have a small property in Florence. His wife’s name was Eletta Canigiani (1270–1319), the mother to Petrarch, whom he married around 1302. Petrarch’s granddaughter was named after her.

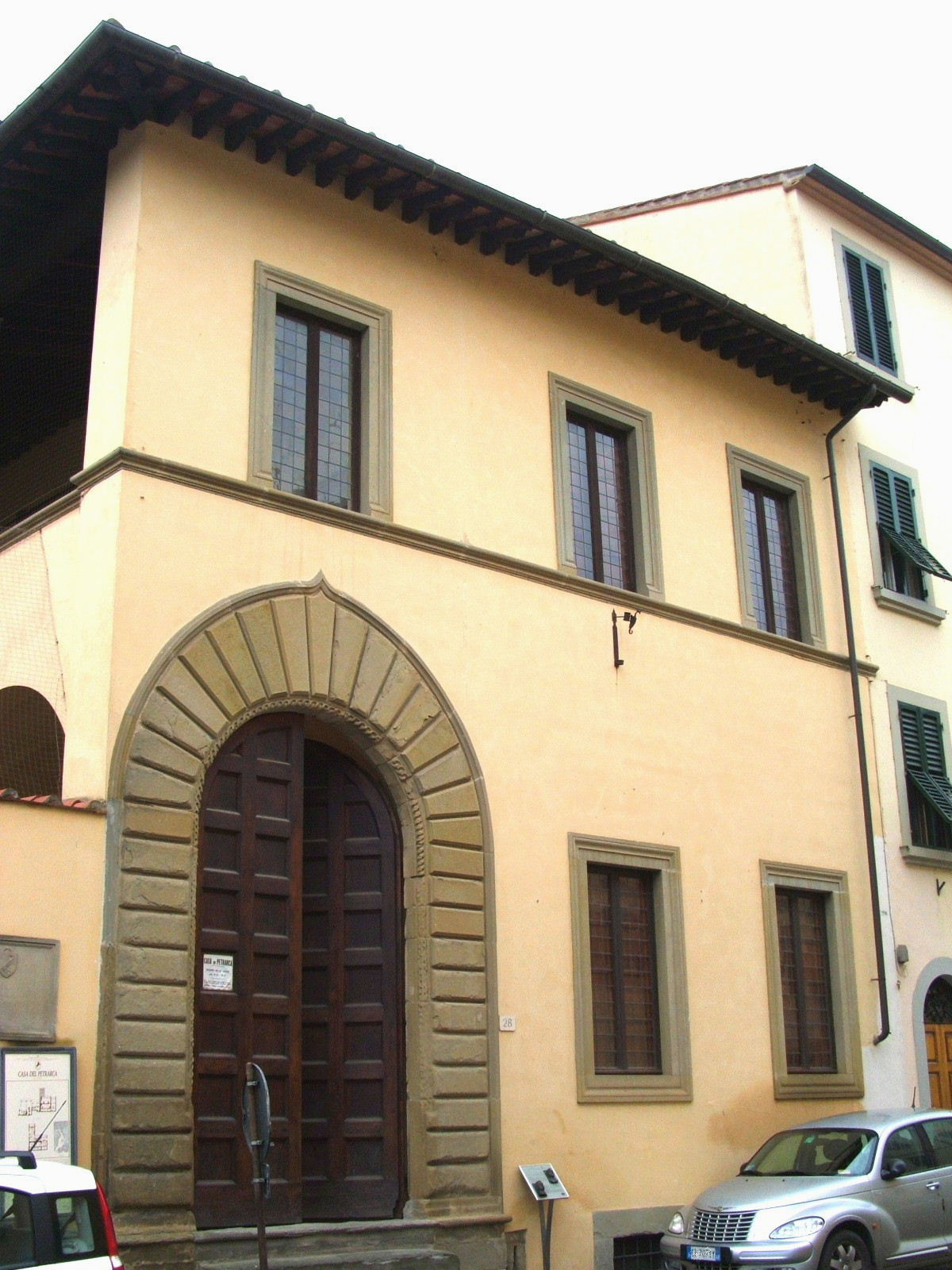
The family house where Pertracco lived and where his son was born in 1304.

Ser Petracco was a merchant and also worked for the State. Before he was 35 years old, he had already held many high public positions. He was "Chancellor of the Commission for the Reforms" as well as a delegate of an important embassy to Pisa in 1301. At the end of 1302 of his political career, he was falsely charged of legal matters in his absence. The sentence was a fine of 1000 Lira or the loss of his right hand. He refused to pay the fine and his property was taken from him. He belonged to the political party of the White Guelphs along with the famous poet Dante, being its most illustrious member. They both were then exiled from Florence by the opposing party, the Black Guelphs.

Francesco Petrarch was an "Aretine" by these mere circumstances - as he always thought of himself really as a Florentine. The family, along with Dante and others that were exiled to Arezzo, found no welcome there. Ser Petracco had to seek employment elsewhere, however his wife and baby Francesco were permitted to go to their little family house they owned in Incisa with relatives.

A family story goes that Francesco was about seven months old when he and his mother moved back to Incisa. Baby Francesco was being transported in a sling arrangement carried over a servant's shoulder. The servant was mounted on a horse. When they crossed through the flooded Arno river, the horse slipped and fell. Francesco and the servant went headlong into the water. With much determination and inner strength, the servant saved Francesco.

Ser Petracco periodically visited the family in Incisa from his out of town employment. In 1307, Francesco’s brother Gherardo was born. A daughter named Selvaggia was born to the couple. Around 1310, they were all reunited for a year in Pisa. Around 1311, Ser Petracco got employment in Avignon whither the papal household had moved from Rome. Then in 1312, the boys and his wife moved to Carpentras, where they lived happily for the next four years. Ser Petracco lived in Avignon most of this time because of his employment there in the profession of law. In 1316, he then sent Petrarch and his brother to study law at the University of Montpellier.

After his first wife's death, he married Niccolosa Sigoli whose father Vanni, was a member of the White Guelphs and was elected priore of Florence in 1301.

His daughter Selvaggia married Giovanni di Tano da Semifonte in 1324. He died two years later in Avignon.

== Gallery ==
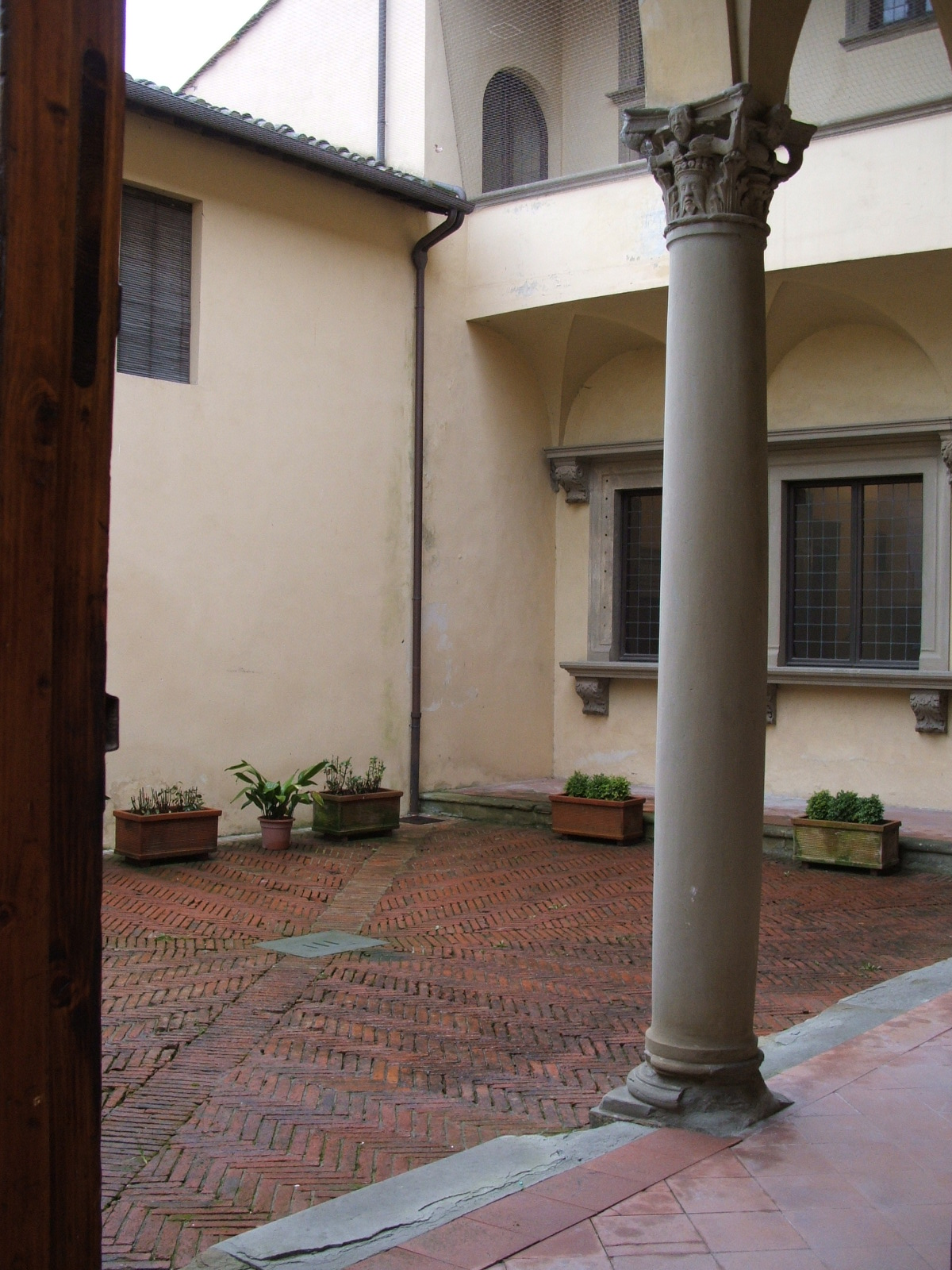
Courtyard of the house of Ser Petracco
