= Petrarch =

Italian scholar and poet (1304–1374)

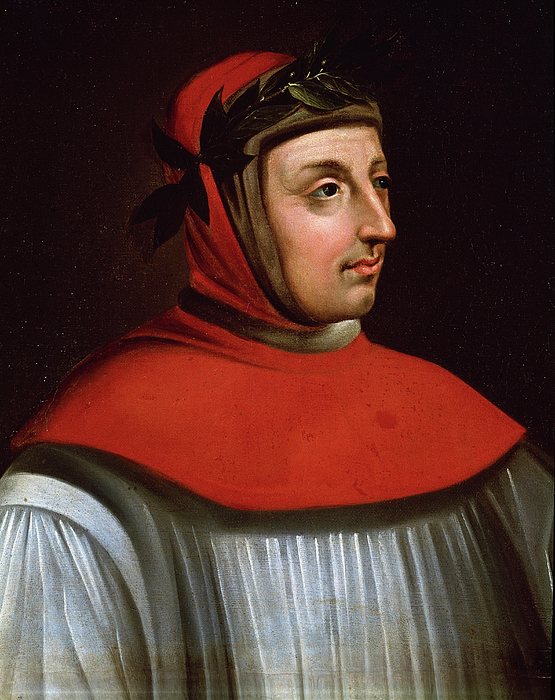
- Posthumous anonymous 17th century portrait
- Born: Francesco di Petracco; 20 July 1304; Arezzo
- Died: 19 July 1374 (aged 69); Arquà, Lordship of Padua
- Resting place: Arquà Petrarca
- Education: University of Montpellier; University of Bologna
- Occupations: Scholar; poet; Catholic cleric
- Children: 2
- Father: Ser Petracco
- Writing career
- Language: Italian (Tuscan dialect); Latin
- Period: Early Renaissance
- Genres: Poetry (epic; sonnet; canzone; eclogue; canticle; other); Prose (treatise; polemic; epistle; travelogue; autobiography; anecdote; correspondence; oration)
- Notable works: Il Canzoniere; Triumphs
- Notable awards: Poet laureate of Rome, 1341
- Movements: Italian Renaissance; humanism

Francis Petrarch (Note: /ˈpɛtrɑːrk, ˈpiːt-/; Latin: Franciscus Petrarcha; modern Italian: Francesco Petrarca [franˈtʃesko peˈtrarka]) (born Francesco di Petracco; 20 July 1304 – 19 July 1374) was an Italian scholar and poet of the early Italian Renaissance, as well as one of the earliest Renaissance humanists.

Petrarch's rediscovery of Cicero's letters is often credited with initiating the 14th-century Italian Renaissance and the founding of Renaissance humanism. In the 16th century, Pietro Bembo created the model for the modern Italian language based on Petrarch's works, as well as those of Giovanni Boccaccio, and, to a lesser extent, Dante Alighieri. Petrarch was later endorsed as a model for Italian style by the Accademia della Crusca.

Petrarch's sonnets were admired and imitated throughout Europe during the Renaissance and became a model for lyrical poetry. He is also known for being the first to develop the concept of the "Dark Ages".

== Biography ==
=== Youth and early career ===
Petrarch was born in the Tuscan city Arezzo on 20 July 1304. He was the son of Ser Petracco (a diminutive nickname for Pietro) and his wife Eletta Canigiani. Petrarch's birth name was Francesco di Petracco ("Francesco [son] of Petracco"), which he Latinized to Franciscus Petrarcha. His younger brother Gherardo (Gerard Petrarch) was born in Incisa in Val d'Arno in 1307. Dante Alighieri was a friend of his father.

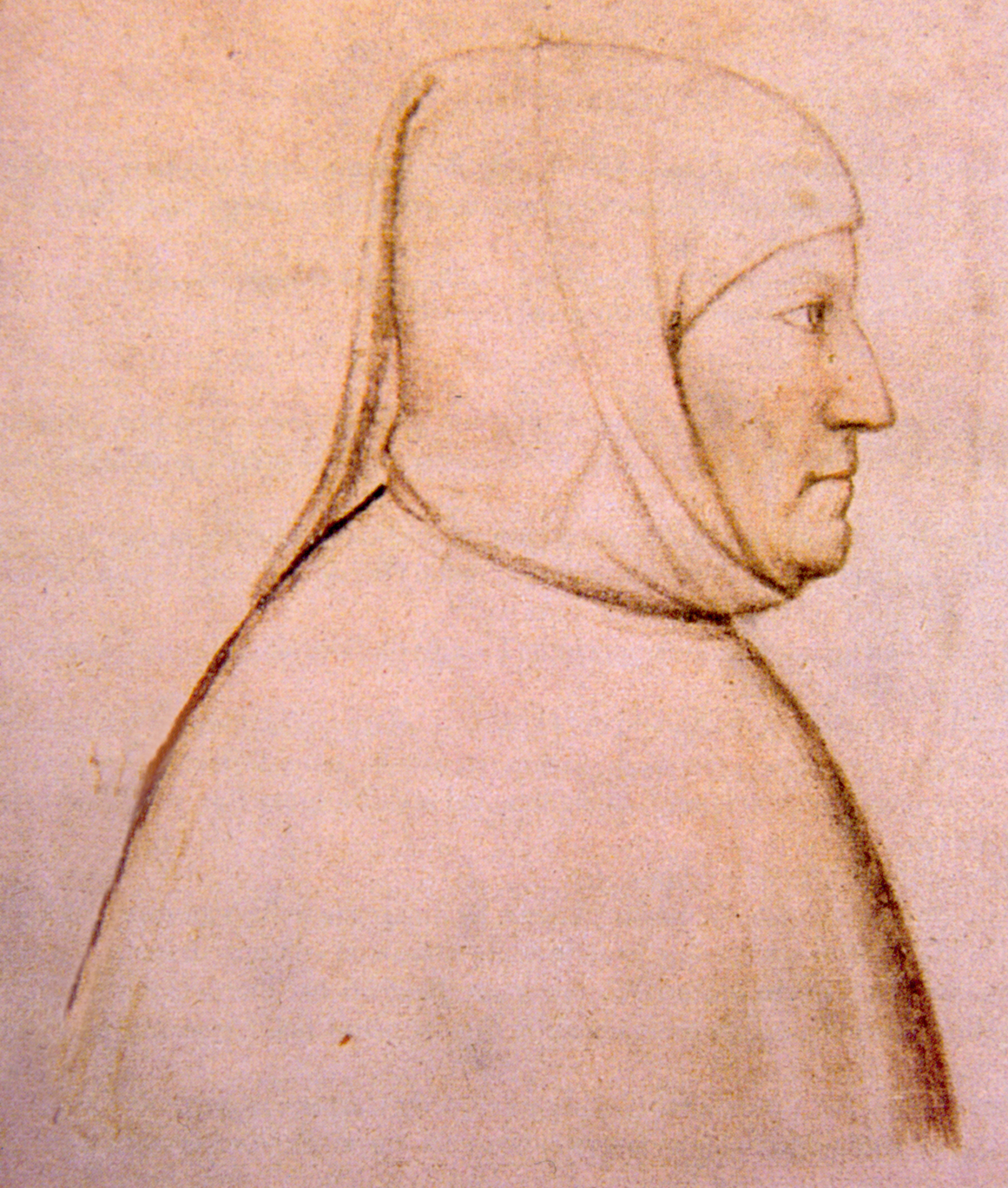
Contemporary Portrait by Altichiero, c. 1370–1380

Petrarch spent his early childhood in the village of Incisa, near Florence. He spent much of his early life at Avignon and nearby Carpentras, where his family moved to follow Pope Clement V, who moved there in 1309 to begin the Avignon Papacy. Petrarch studied law at the University of Montpellier (1316–1320) and Bologna (1320–1326) with a lifelong friend and schoolmate, Guido Sette, future archbishop of Genoa. Because his father was in the legal profession (a notary), he insisted that Petrarch and his brother also study law. Petrarch, however, was primarily interested in writing and studying Latin literature and considered these seven years wasted. Petrarch became so distracted by his non-legal interests that his father once threw his books into a fire, which he later lamented. Additionally, he proclaimed that through legal manipulation his guardians robbed him of his small property inheritance in Florence, which only reinforced his dislike for the legal system. He protested, "I couldn't face making a merchandise of my mind", since he viewed the legal system as the art of selling justice.

Petrarch was a prolific letter writer and counted Boccaccio among the notable friends with whom he regularly corresponded. After the death of their parents, Petrarch and his brother Gherardo went back to Avignon in 1326, where he worked in numerous clerical offices. This work gave him much time to devote to his writing. With his first large-scale work, Africa, an epic poem in Latin about the great Roman general Scipio Africanus, Petrarch emerged as a European celebrity. On 8 April 1341, he became the second poet laureate since classical antiquity and was crowned by Roman Senatori Giordano Orsini and Orso dell'Anguillara on the sacred soil of Rome's Capitoline Hill.

He traveled widely in Europe, served as an ambassador, and has been called "the first tourist" because he traveled for pleasure such as his ascent of Mont Ventoux. During his travels, he collected crumbling Latin manuscripts and was a prime mover in the recovery of knowledge from writers of Rome and Greece. He encouraged and advised Leontius Pilatus's translation of Homer from a manuscript purchased by Boccaccio, although he was severely critical of the result. Petrarch had acquired a copy, which he did not entrust to Leontius, but he knew no Greek; Petrarch said of himself, "Homer was dumb to him, while he was deaf to Homer". In 1345 he personally discovered a collection of Cicero's letters not previously known to have existed, the collection Epistulae ad Atticum, in the Chapter Library (Biblioteca Capitolare) of Verona Cathedral.

Disdaining what he believed to be the ignorance of the era in which he lived, Petrarch is credited with creating the concept of a historical "Dark Ages", which most modern scholars now find inaccurate and misleading.

=== Mount Ventoux ===
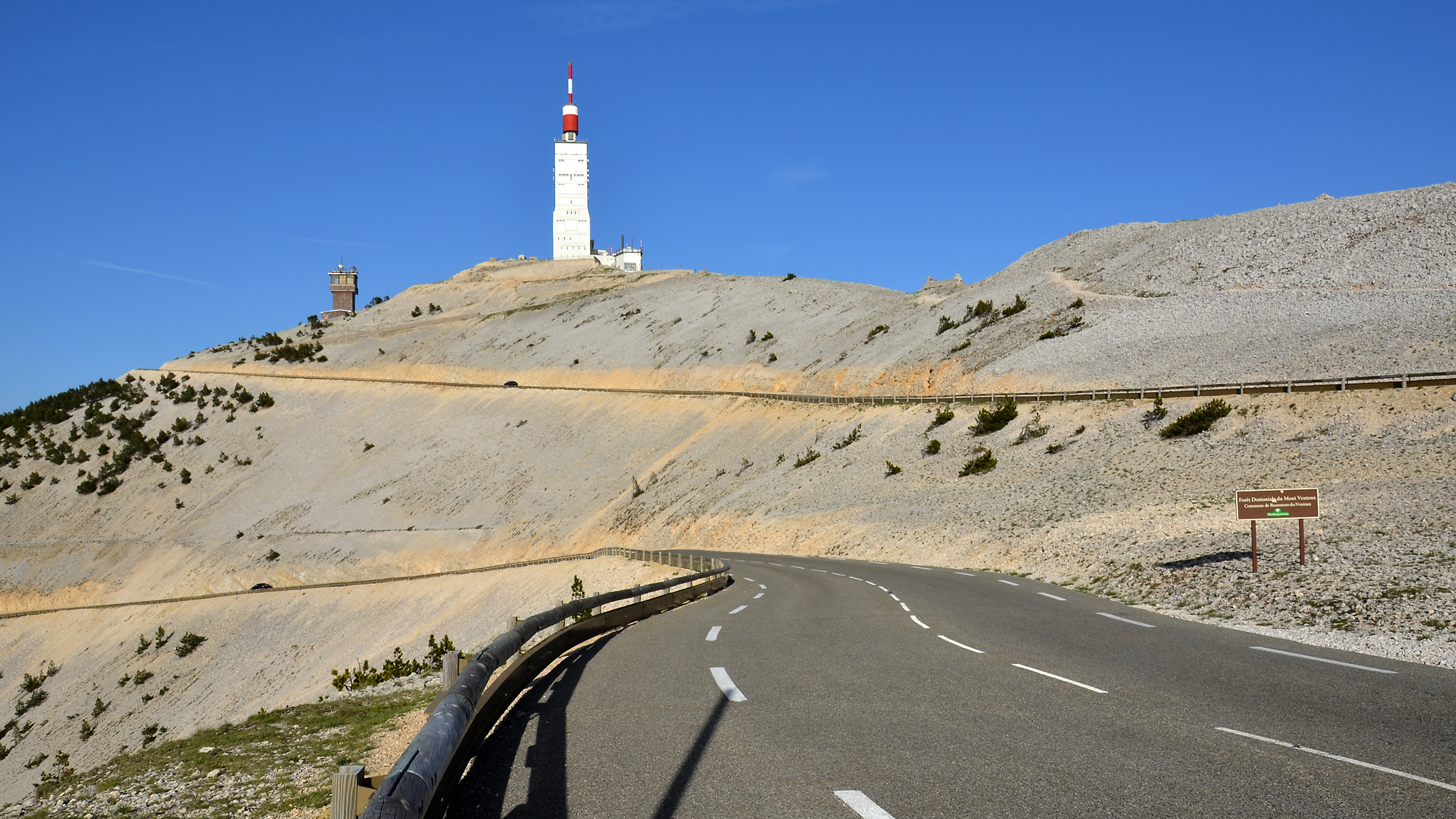
Summit of Mont Ventoux

Petrarch recounts that on 26 April 1336, with his brother and two servants, he climbed to the top of Mont Ventoux (1,912 meters (6,273 ft), a feat which he undertook for recreation rather than necessity. The exploit is described in a famous letter addressed to his friend and confessor, the monk Dionigi di Borgo San Sepolcro, composed some time after the fact. In it, Petrarch claimed to have been inspired by Philip V of Macedon's ascent of Mount Haemo and that an aged peasant had told him that nobody had ascended Ventoux before or after himself, 50 years earlier, and warned him against attempting to do so. The nineteenth-century Swiss historian Jacob Burckhardt noted that Jean Buridan had climbed the same mountain a few years before, and ascents accomplished during the Middle Ages have been recorded, including that of Anno II, Archbishop of Cologne.

Scholars note that Petrarch's letter to Dionigi displays a strikingly "modern" attitude of aesthetic gratification in the grandeur of the scenery and is still often cited in books and journals devoted to the sport of mountaineering. In Petrarch, this attitude is coupled with an aspiration for a virtuous Christian life, and on reaching the summit, he took from his pocket a volume by his beloved mentor, Saint Augustine, that he always carried with him.

For pleasure alone he climbed Mont Ventoux, which rises to more than six thousand feet, beyond Vaucluse. It was no great feat, of course; but he was the first recorded Alpinist of modern times, the first to climb a mountain merely for the delight of looking from its top. (Or almost the first; for in a high pasture he met an old shepherd, who said that fifty years before he had attained the summit, and had got nothing from it save toil and repentance and torn clothing.) Petrarch was dazed and stirred by the view of the Alps, the mountains around Lyons, the Rhone, the Bay of Marseilles. He took Augustine's Confessions from his pocket and reflected that his climb was merely an allegory of aspiration toward a better life.

As the book fell open, Petrarch's eyes were immediately drawn to the following words:

And men go about to wonder at the heights of the mountains, and the mighty waves of the sea, and the wide sweep of rivers, and the circuit of the ocean, and the revolution of the stars, but themselves they consider not.

Petrarch's response was to turn from the outer world of nature to the inner world of "soul":

I closed the book, angry with myself that I should still be admiring earthly things who might long ago have learned from even the pagan philosophers that nothing is wonderful but the soul, which, when great itself, finds nothing great outside itself. Then, in truth, I was satisfied that I had seen enough of the mountain; I turned my inward eye upon myself, and from that time not a syllable fell from my lips until we reached the bottom again. ... [W]e look about us for what is to be found only within. ... How many times, think you, did I turn back that day, to glance at the summit of the mountain which seemed scarcely a cubit high compared with the range of human contemplation

James Hillman argues that this rediscovery of the inner world is the real significance of the Ventoux event. The Renaissance begins not with the ascent of Mont Ventoux but with the subsequent descent—the "return [...] to the valley of soul", as Hillman puts it.

=== Later years ===
Petrarch spent the later part of his life journeying through northern Italy and southern France as an international scholar and poet-diplomat. His career in the Church did not allow him to marry, but he is believed to have fathered two children by a woman (or women) unknown to posterity. A son, Giovanni, was born in 1337, and a daughter, Francesca, was born in 1343. He later legitimized both.

For a number of years in the 1340s and 1350s he lived in a small house at Fontaine-de-Vaucluse east of Avignon in France.

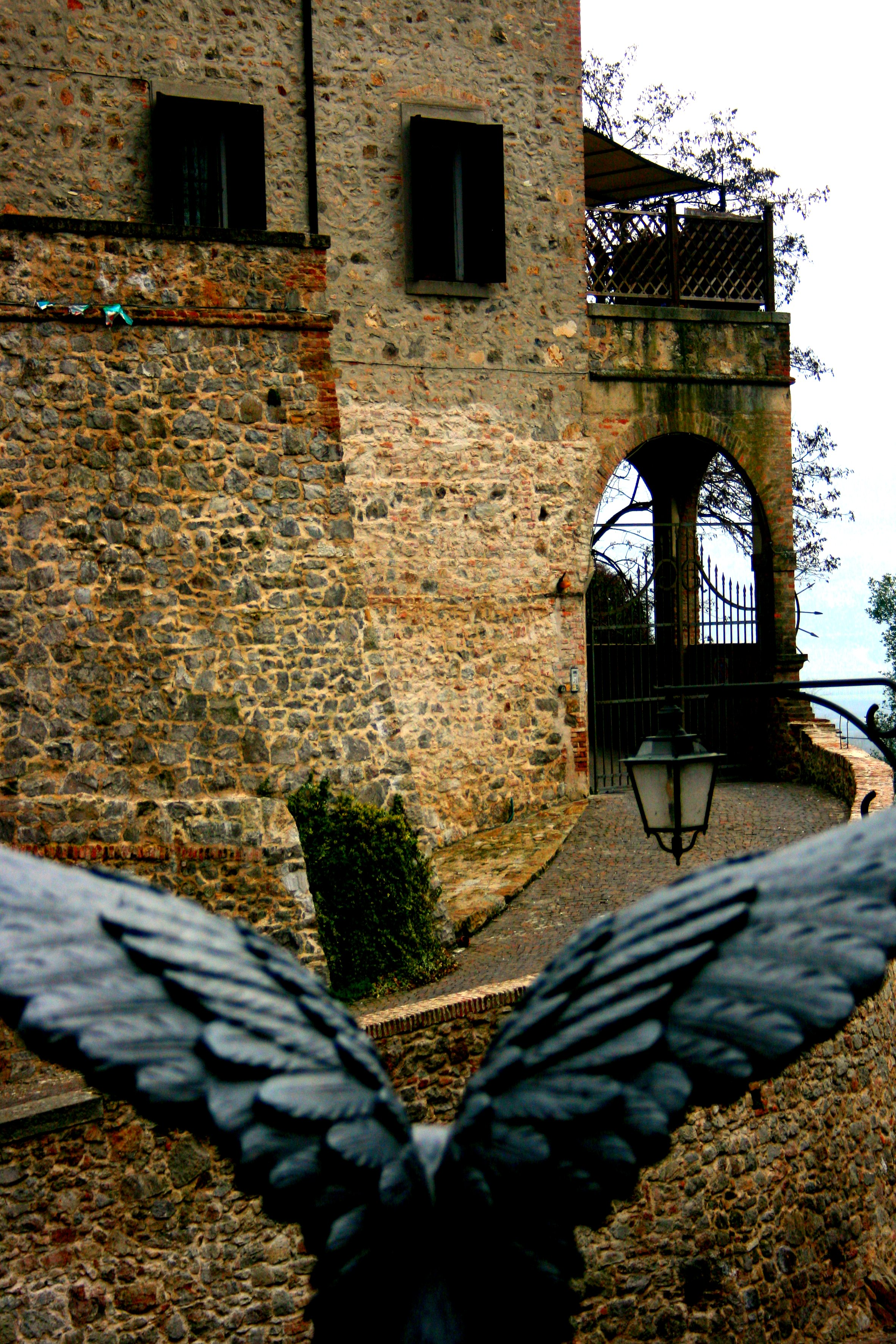
Petrarch's Arquà house near Padua where he retired to spend his last years

Giovanni died of the plague in 1361. In the same year Petrarch was named canon in Monselice near Padua. Francesca married Francescuolo da Brossano, who was later named executor of Petrarch's will, that same year. In 1362, shortly after the birth of a daughter, Eletta (the same name as Petrarch's mother), they joined Petrarch in Venice to flee the plague then ravaging parts of Europe. A second grandchild, Francesco, was born in 1366, but died before his second birthday. Francesca and her family lived with Petrarch in Venice for five years from 1362 to 1367 at Palazzo Molina; although Petrarch continued to travel in those years. Between 1361 and 1369 the younger Boccaccio paid the older Petrarch two visits. The first was in Venice, the second was in Padua.

About 1368 Petrarch and Francesca (with her family) moved to the small town of Arquà in the Euganean Hills near Padua, where he passed his remaining years in religious contemplation. He died in his house in Arquà on 18/19 July 1374. The house now hosts a permanent exhibition of Petrarch's works and curiosities, including the famous tomb of an embalmed cat long believed to be Petrarch's (although there is no evidence Petrarch actually had a cat). On the marble slab, there is a Latin inscription written by Antonio Quarenghi:

Original Latin

Etruscus gemino vates ardebat amore:
Maximus ignis ego; Laura secundus erat.
Quid rides? divinæ illam si gratia formæ,
Me dignam eximio fecit amante fides.
Si numeros geniumque sacris dedit illa libellis
Causa ego ne sævis muribus esca forent.
Arcebam sacro vivens a limine mures,
Ne domini exitio scripta diserta forent;
Incutio trepidis eadem defuncta pavorem,
Et viget exanimi in corpore prisca fides.

English translation

The Tuscan bard of deathless fame
Nursed in his breast a double flame,
Unequally divided;
And when I say I had his heart,
While Laura play'd the second part,
I must not be derided.

For my fidelity was such,
It merited regard as much
As Laura's grace and beauty;
She first inspired the poet's lay,
But since I drove the mice away,
His love repaid my duty.

Through all my exemplary life,
So well did I in constant strife
Employ my claws and curses,
That even now, though I am dead,
Those nibbling wretches dare not tread
On one of Petrarch's verses.

Petrarch's will (dated 4 April 1370) leaves fifty florins to Boccaccio "to buy a warm winter dressing gown"; various legacies (a horse, a silver cup, a lute, a Madonna) to his brother and his friends; his house in Vaucluse to its caretaker; money for Masses offered for his soul, and money for the poor; and the bulk of his estate to his son-in-law, Francescuolo da Brossano, who is to give half of it to "the person to whom, as he knows, I wish it to go"; presumably his daughter, Francesca, Brossano's wife. The will mentions neither the property in Arquà nor his library; Petrarch's library of notable manuscripts was already promised to Venice, in exchange for the Palazzo Molina. This arrangement was probably cancelled when he moved to Padua, the enemy of Venice, in 1368. The library was seized by the da Carrara lords of Padua, and his books and manuscripts are now widely scattered over Europe. Nevertheless, the Biblioteca Marciana traditionally claimed this bequest as its founding, although it was in fact founded by Cardinal Bessarion in 1468.

== Works ==
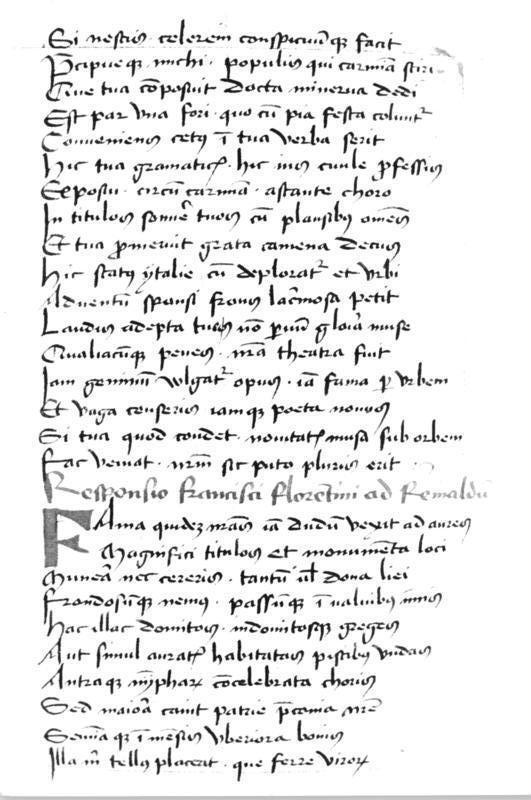
Original lyrics by Petrarch, found in 1985 in Erfurt.

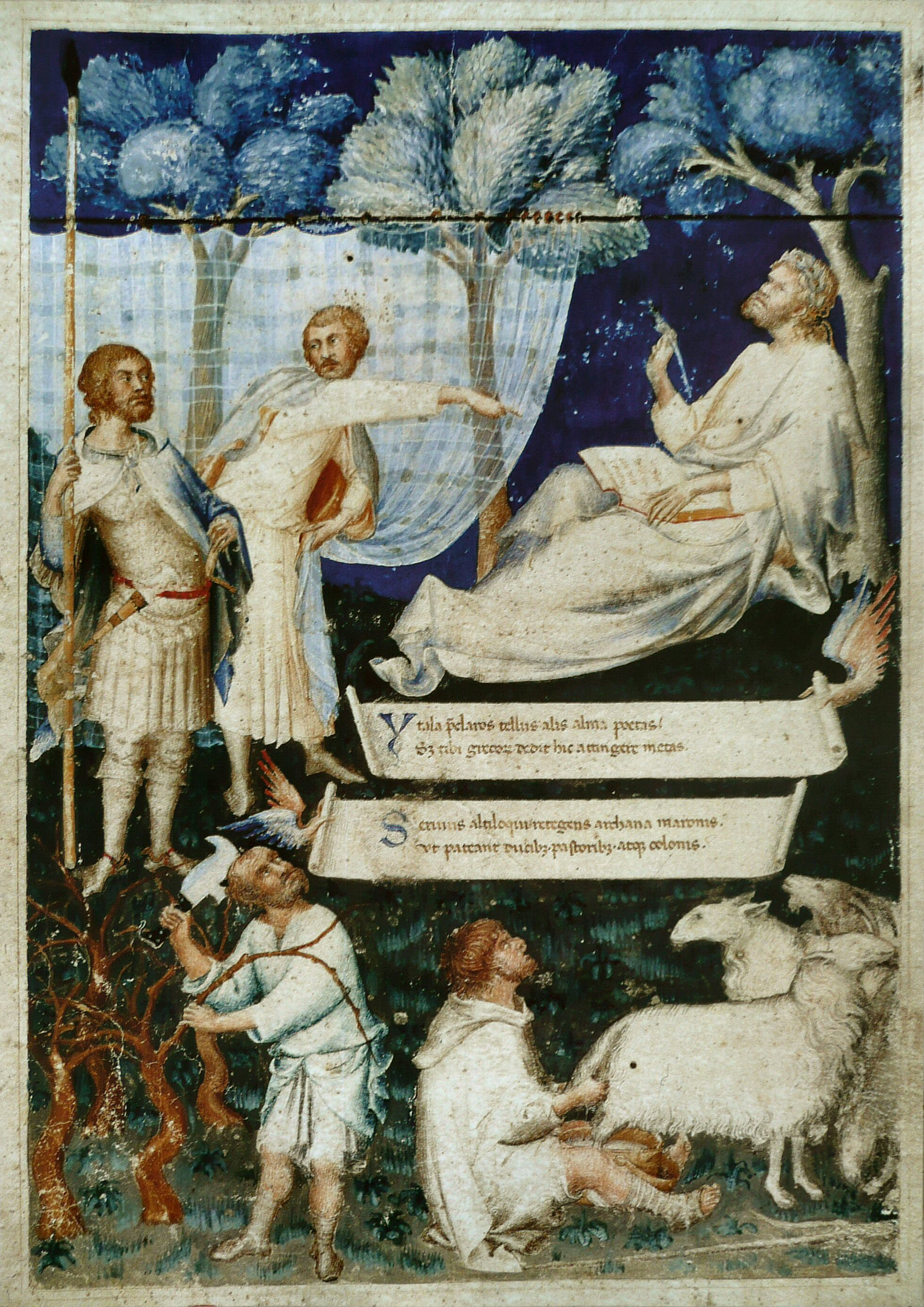
Petrarch's Virgil (title page) (c. 1336) Illuminated manuscript by Simone Martini, 29 x 20 cm Biblioteca Ambrosiana, Milan.

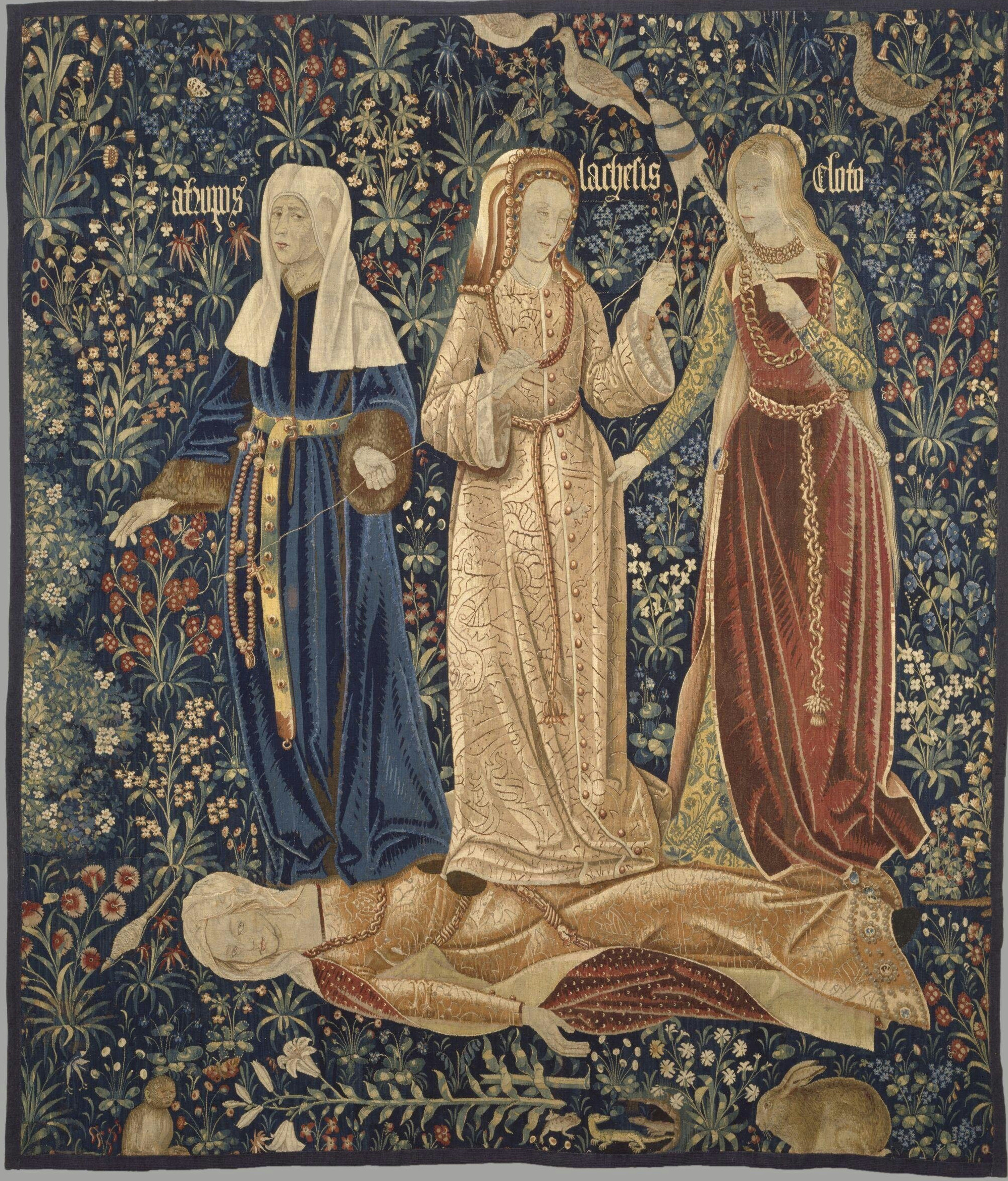
The Triumph of Death, or The 3 Fates. Flemish tapestry (probably Brussels, c. 1510–1520). Victoria and Albert Museum, London. The three Fates, Clotho, Lachesis and Atropos, who spin, draw out and cut the thread of life, represent Death in this tapestry, as they triumph over the fallen body of Chastity. This is the third subject in Petrarch's poem "The Triumphs". First, Love triumphs; then Love is overcome by Chastity, Chastity by Death, Death by Fame, Fame by Time and Time by Eternity

Petrarch is best known for his Italian poetry, notably the Rerum vulgarium fragmenta ("Fragments of Vernacular Matters"), a collection of 366 lyric poems in various genres also known as 'canzoniere' ('songbook'), and I trionfi ("The Triumphs"), a six-part narrative poem of Dantean inspiration. However, Petrarch was an enthusiastic Latin scholar and did most of his writing in this language. His Latin writings include scholarly works, introspective essays, letters, and more poetry. Among them are Secretum ("My Secret Book"), an intensely personal, imaginary dialogue with a figure inspired by Augustine of Hippo; De viris illustribus ("On Famous Men"), a series of moral biographies; Rerum memorandarum libri, an incomplete treatise on the cardinal virtues; De otio religiosorum ("On Religious Leisure") and De vita solitaria ("On the Solitary Life"), which praise the contemplative life; De remediis utriusque fortunae ("Remedies for Fortune Fair and Foul"), a self-help book which remained popular for hundreds of years; Itinerarium ("Petrarch's Guide to the Holy Land"); invectives against opponents such as doctors, scholastics, and the French; the Bucolicum carmen, a collection of 12 pastoral poems; and the unfinished epic Africa. He translated seven psalms, a collection known as the Penitential Psalms.

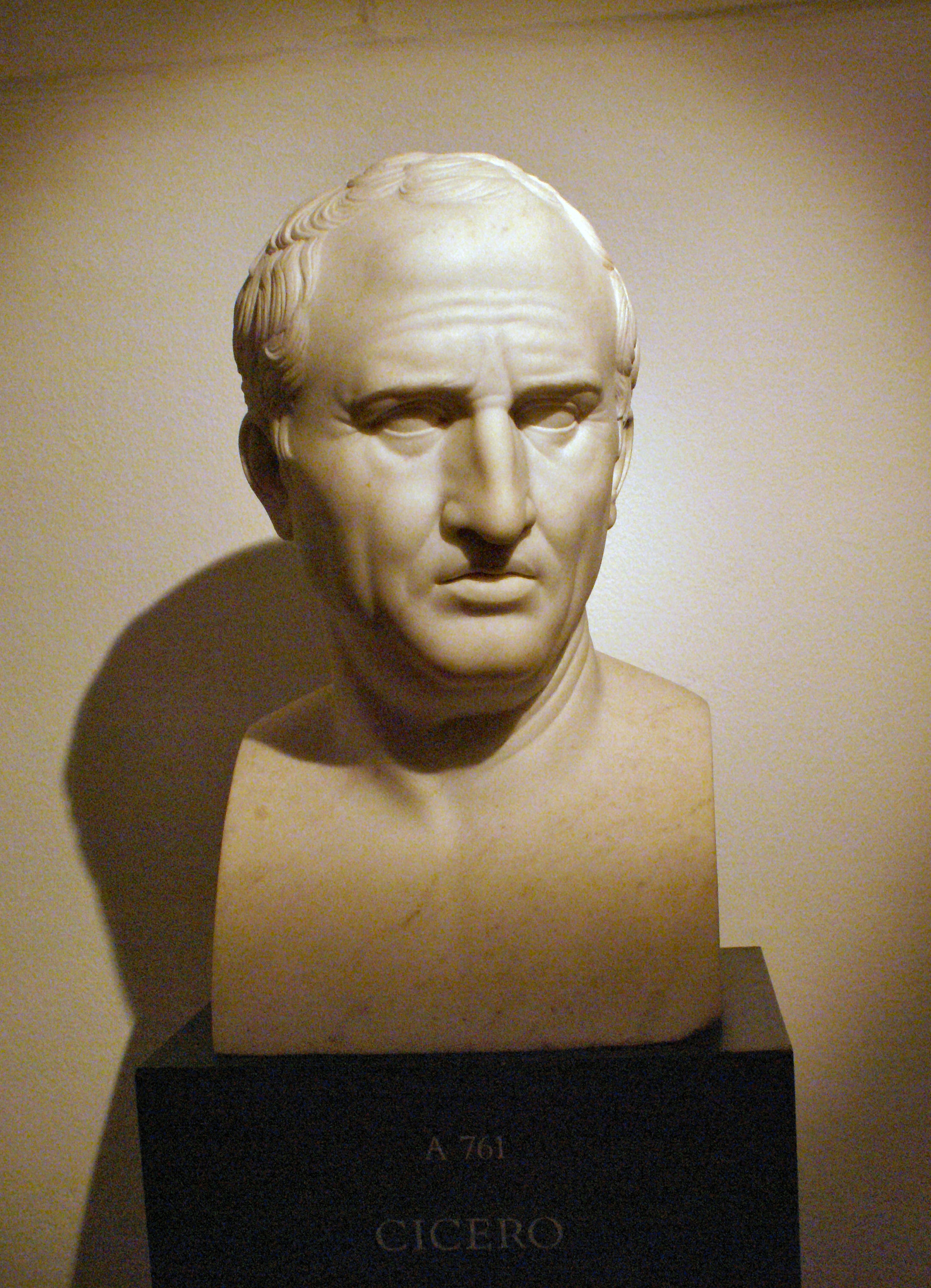
Petrarch revived the work and letters of the ancient Roman Senator Marcus Tullius Cicero

Petrarch also published many volumes of his letters, including a few written to long-dead figures from history such as Cicero and Virgil. Cicero, Virgil, and Seneca were his literary models. Most of his Latin writings are difficult to find today, but several of his works are available in English translations. Several of his Latin works are scheduled to appear in the Harvard University Press series I Tatti. It is difficult to assign any precise dates to his writings because he tended to revise them throughout his life.

Petrarch collected his letters into four major sets of books called

- Epistolae familiares or Rerum familiarum liber ("Letters on Familiar Matters")
- Liber sine nomine
- Disperse
- Seniles ("Letters of Old Age") and
- Metricae

The first and the fourth are available in English translation. The plan for his letters was suggested to him by knowledge of Cicero's letters. These were published "without names" to protect the recipients, all of whom had close relationships to Petrarch. The recipients of these letters included Philippe de Cabassoles, bishop of Cavaillon; Ildebrandino Conti, bishop of Padua; Cola di Rienzo, tribune of Rome; Francesco Nelli, priest of the Prior of the Church of the Holy Apostles in Florence; and Niccolò di Capoccia, a cardinal and priest of Saint Vitalis. His "Letter to Posterity" (the last letter in Seniles) gives an autobiography and a synopsis of his philosophy in life. It was originally written in Latin and was completed in 1371 or 1372—the first such autobiography in a thousand years (since Saint Augustine).

While Petrarch's poetry was set to music frequently after his death, especially by Italian madrigal composers of the Renaissance in the 16th century, only one musical setting composed during Petrarch's lifetime survives. This is Non al suo amante by Jacopo da Bologna, written around 1350.

=== Laura and poetry ===
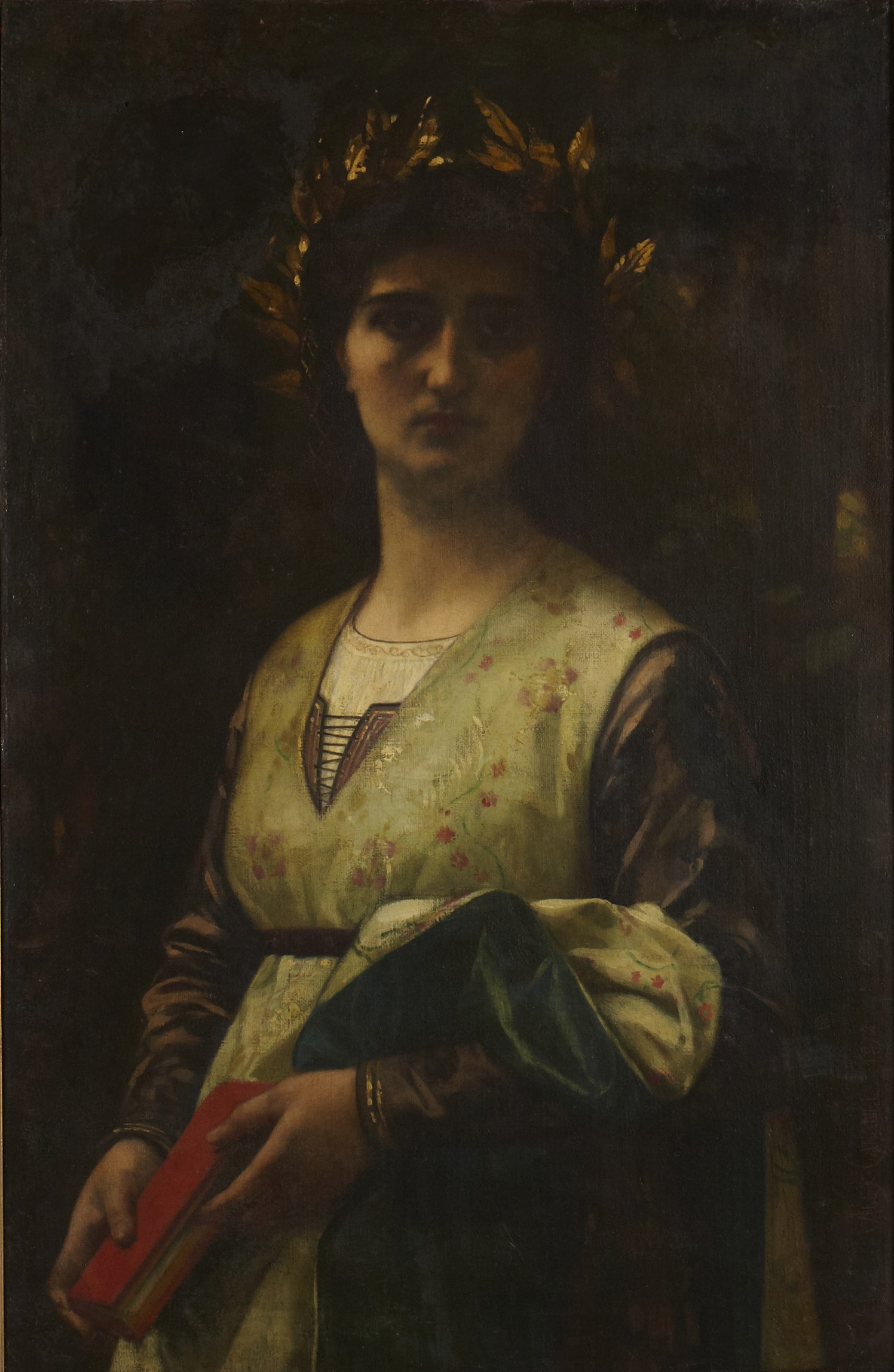
Alexandre Cabanel - Petrarch's Laura (Princeton University Art Museum)

On 6 April 1327, after Petrarch gave up his vocation as a priest, the sight of a woman called "Laura" in the church of Sainte-Claire d'Avignon in 1327, awoke in him a lasting passion, celebrated in the Rerum vulgarium fragmenta ("Fragments of Vernacular Matters"). Laura may have been Laura de Noves, the wife of Count Hugues de Sade (an ancestor of the Marquis de Sade). There is little definite information in Petrarch's work concerning Laura, except that she is lovely to look at, fair-haired, with a modest, dignified bearing. Laura and Petrarch had little or no personal contact. According to his "Secretum", she refused him because she was already married. He channeled his feelings into love poems that were exclamatory rather than persuasive, and wrote prose that showed his contempt for men who pursue women. Upon her death in 1348, the poet found that his grief was as difficult to live with as was his former despair. Later, in his "Letter to Posterity", Petrarch wrote: "In my younger days I struggled constantly with an overwhelming but pure love affair—my only one, and I would have struggled with it longer had not premature death, bitter but salutary for me, extinguished the cooling flames. I certainly wish I could say that I have always been entirely free from desires of the flesh, but I would be lying if I did".

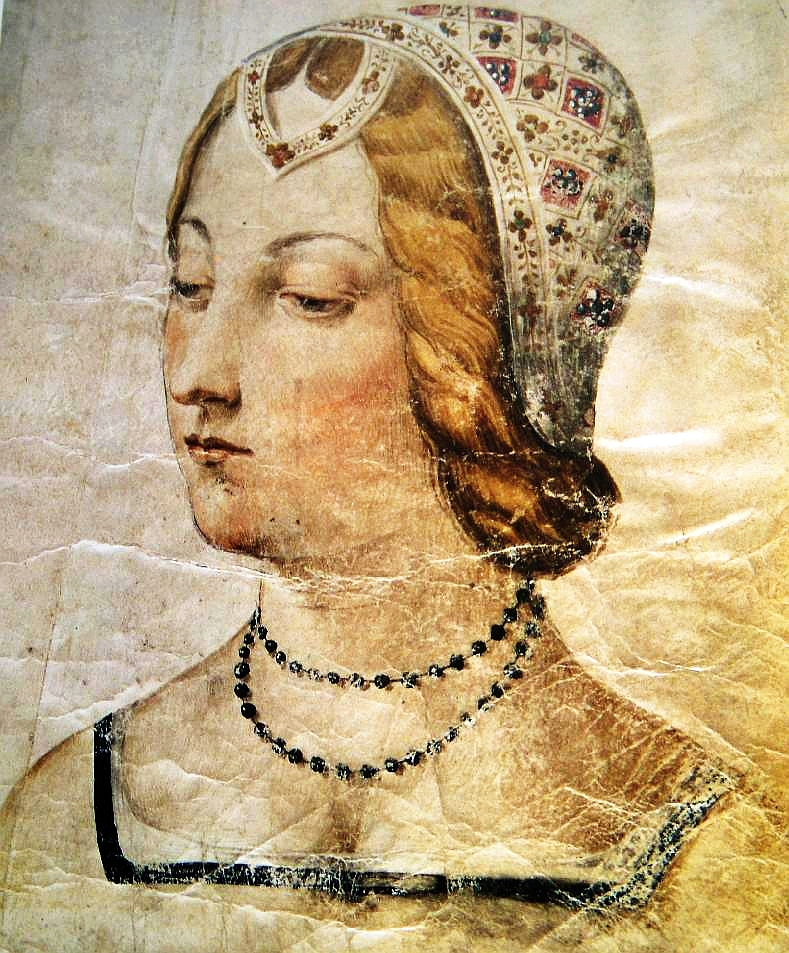
Laura de Noves

While it is possible she was an idealized or pseudonymous character—particularly since the name "Laura" has a linguistic connection to the poetic "laurels" Petrarch coveted—Petrarch himself always denied it. His frequent use of l'aura is also remarkable: for example, the line "Erano i capei d'oro a l'aura sparsi" may mean both "her hair was all over Laura's body" and "the wind (l'aura) blew through her hair". There is psychological realism in the description of Laura, although Petrarch draws heavily on conventionalised descriptions of love and lovers from troubadour songs and other literature of courtly love. Her presence causes him unspeakable joy, but his unrequited love creates unendurable desires, inner conflicts between the ardent lover and the mystic Christian, making it impossible to reconcile the two. Petrarch's quest for love leads to hopelessness and irreconcilable anguish, as he expresses in the series of paradoxes in Rima 134 "Pace non trovo, et non ò da far guerra;/e temo, et spero; et ardo, et son un ghiaccio": "I find no peace, and yet I make no war:/and fear, and hope: and burn, and I am ice".

Laura is unreachable and evanescent – descriptions of her are evocative yet fragmentary. Francesco de Sanctis praises the powerful music of his verse in his Storia della letteratura italiana. Gianfranco Contini, in a famous essay ("Preliminari sulla lingua del Petrarca". Petrarca, Canzoniere. Turin, Einaudi, 1964), has described Petrarch's language in terms of "unilinguismo" (contrasted with Dantean "plurilinguismo").

=== Sonnet 227 ===
Original Italian

Aura che quelle chiome bionde et crespe
cercondi et movi, et se’ mossa da loro,
soavemente, et spargi quel dolce oro,
et poi ’l raccogli, e ’n bei nodi il rincrespe,

tu stai nelli occhi ond’amorose vespe
mi pungon sí, che ’nfin qua il sento et ploro,
et vacillando cerco il mio tesoro,
come animal che spesso adombre e ’ncespe:

ch’or me ’l par ritrovar, et or m’accorgo
ch’i’ ne son lunge, or mi sollievo or caggio,
ch’or quel ch’i’ bramo, or quel ch’è vero scorgo.

Aër felice, col bel vivo raggio
rimanti; et tu corrente et chiaro gorgo,
ché non poss’io cangiar teco vïaggio?

English translation by A.S. Kline

Breeze, blowing that blonde curling hair,
stirring it, and being softly stirred in turn,
scattering that sweet gold about, then
gathering it, in a lovely knot of curls again,

you linger around bright eyes whose loving sting
pierces me so, till I feel it and weep,
and I wander searching for my treasure,
like a creature that often shies and kicks:

now I seem to find her, now I realise
she’s far away, now I’m comforted, now despair,
now longing for her, now truly seeing her.

Happy air, remain here with your
living rays: and you, clear running stream,
why can’t I exchange my path for yours?

== Dante ==
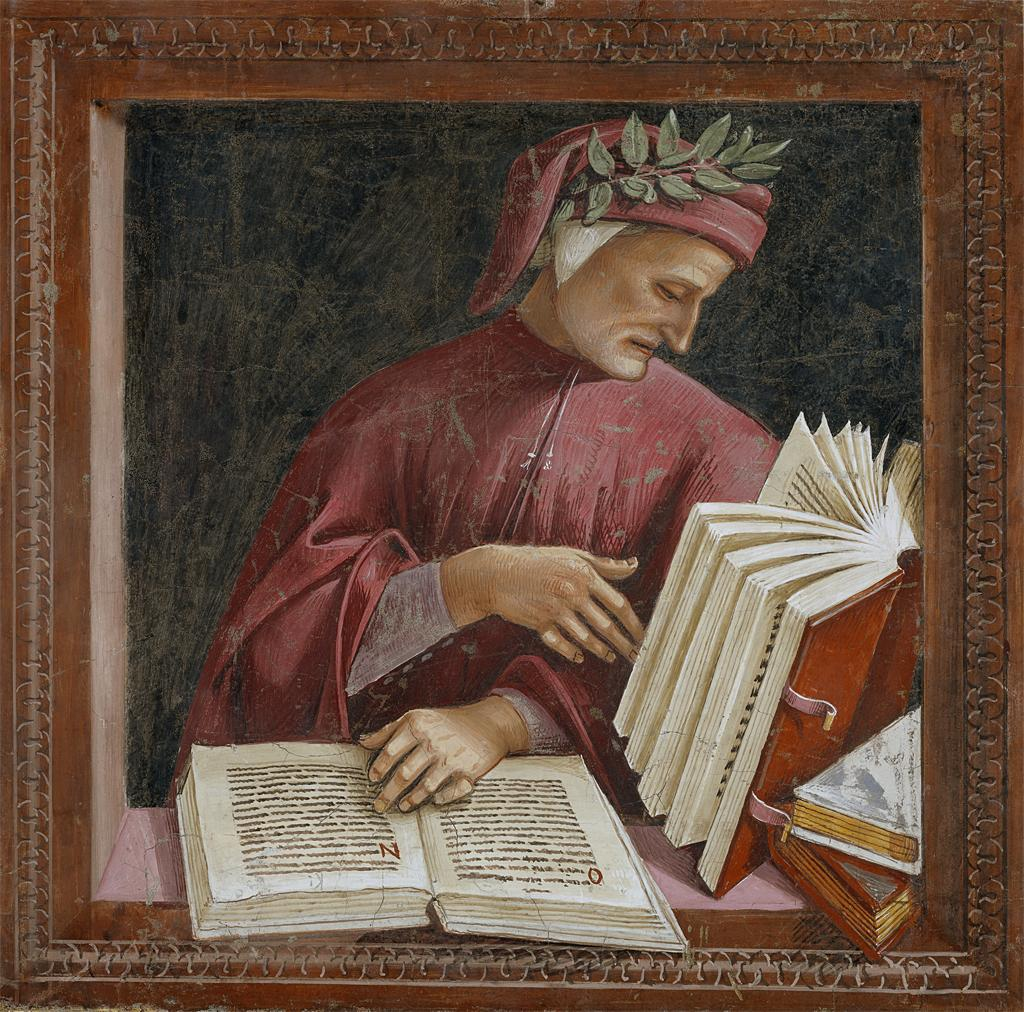
Dante Alighieri, detail from a Luca Signorelli fresco in the chapel of San Brizio, Duomo, Orvieto.

Petrarch is very different from Dante and his Divina Commedia. In spite of the metaphysical subject, the Commedia is deeply rooted in the cultural and social milieu of turn-of-the-century Florence: Dante's rise to power (1300) and exile (1302); his political passions call for a "violent" use of language, where he uses all the registers, from low and trivial to sublime and philosophical. Petrarch confessed to Boccaccio that he had never read the Commedia, remarks Contini, wondering whether this was true or Petrarch wanted to distance himself from Dante. Dante's language evolves as he grows old, from the courtly love of his early stilnovistic Rime and Vita nuova to the Convivio and Divina Commedia, where Beatrice is sanctified as the goddess of philosophy—the philosophy announced by the Donna Gentile at the death of Beatrice.

In contrast, Petrarch's thought and style are relatively uniform throughout his life—he spent much of it revising the songs and sonnets of the Canzoniere rather than moving to new subjects or poetry. Here, poetry alone provides a consolation for personal grief, much less philosophy or politics (as in Dante), for Petrarch fights within himself (sensuality versus mysticism, profane versus Christian literature), not against anything outside of himself. The strong moral and political convictions which had inspired Dante belong to the Middle Ages and the libertarian spirit of the commune; Petrarch's moral dilemmas, his refusal to take a stand in politics, his reclusive life point to a different direction, or time. The free commune, the place that had made Dante an eminent politician and scholar, was being dismantled: the signoria was taking its place. Humanism and its spirit of empirical inquiry, however, were making progress—but the papacy (especially after Avignon) and the empire (Henry VII, the last hope of the white Guelphs, died near Siena in 1313) had lost much of their original prestige.

Petrarch polished and perfected the sonnet form inherited from Giacomo da Lentini and which Dante widely used in his Vita nuova to popularise the new courtly love of the Dolce Stil Novo. The tercet benefits from Dante's terza rima (compare the Divina Commedia), the quatrains prefer the ABBA–ABBA to the ABAB–ABAB scheme of the Sicilians. The imperfect rhymes of u with closed o and i with closed e (inherited from Guittone's mistaken rendering of Sicilian verse) are excluded, but the rhyme of open and closed o is kept. Finally, Petrarch's enjambment creates longer semantic units by connecting one line to the following. The vast majority (317) of Petrarch's 366 poems collected in the Canzoniere (dedicated to Laura) were sonnets, and the Petrarchan sonnet still bears his name.

== Philosophy ==
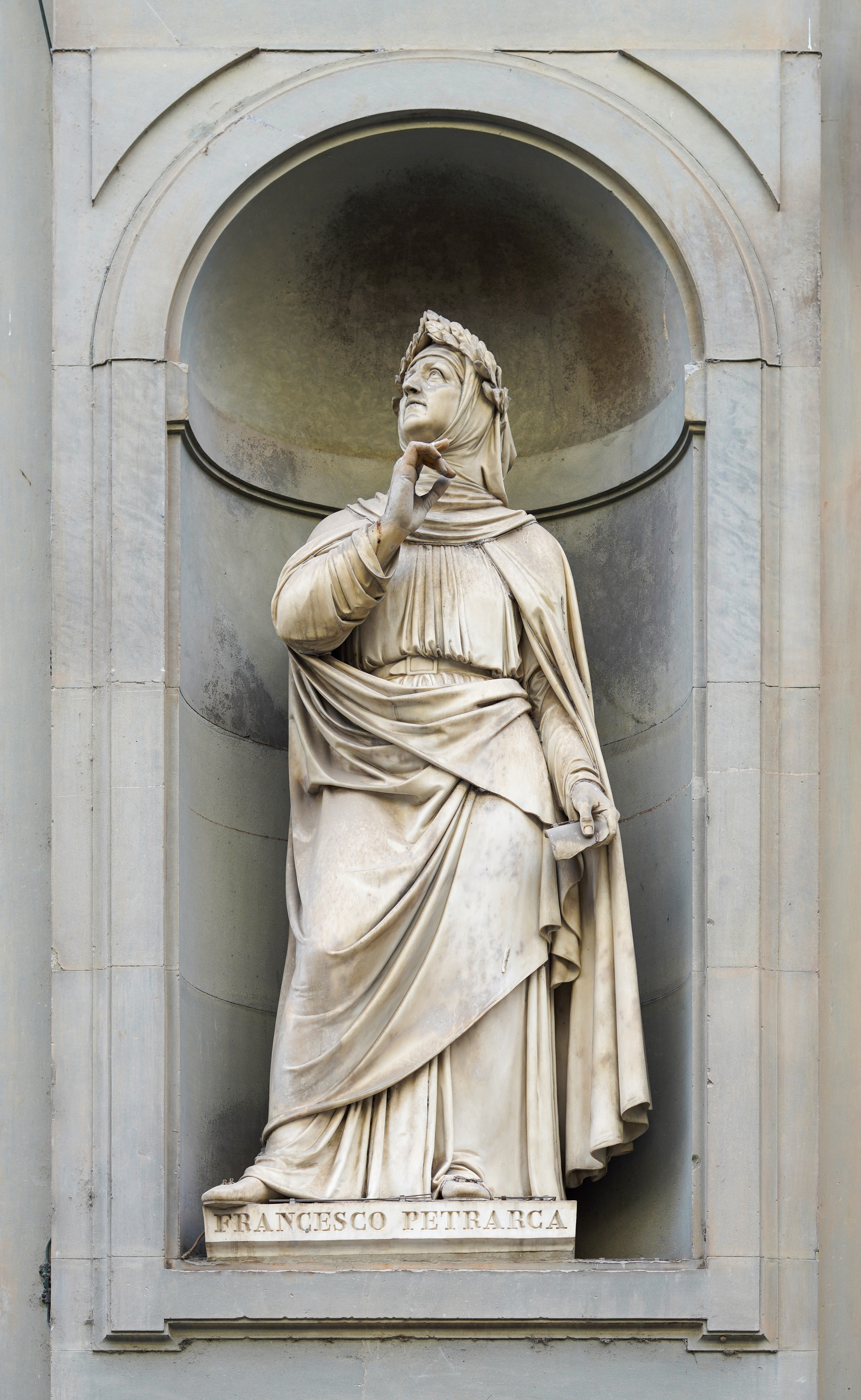
Statue of Petrarch on the Uffizi Palace, in Florence

Petrarch is often referred to as the father of humanism and considered by many to be the "father of the Renaissance". In Secretum meum, he points out that secular achievements do not necessarily preclude an authentic relationship with God, arguing instead that God has given humans their vast intellectual and creative potential to be used to its fullest. He inspired humanist philosophy, which led to the intellectual flowering of the Renaissance. He believed in the immense moral and practical value of the study of ancient history and literature—that is, the study of human thought and action. Petrarch was a devout Catholic and did not see a conflict between realizing humanity's potential and having religious faith, although many philosophers and scholars have styled him a Proto-Protestant who challenged the Pope's dogma.

A highly introspective man, Petrarch helped shape the nascent humanist movement as many of the internal conflicts and musings expressed in his writings were embraced by Renaissance humanist philosophers and argued continually for the next 200 years. For example, he struggled with the proper relation between the active and contemplative life, and tended to emphasize the importance of solitude and study. In a clear disagreement with Dante, in 1346 Petrarch argued in De vita solitaria that Pope Celestine V's refusal of the papacy in 1294 was a virtuous example of solitary life. Later the politician and thinker Leonardo Bruni (1370–1444) argued for the active life, or "civic humanism". As a result, a number of political, military, and religious leaders during the Renaissance were inculcated with the notion that their pursuit of personal fulfillment should be grounded in classical example and philosophical contemplation.

== Petrarchism ==
Petrarchism was a 16th-century literary movement of Petrarch's style by Italian, French, Spanish and English followers (partially coincident with Mannerism), who regarded his collection of poetry Il Canzoniere as a canonical text. Among them, the names are listed in order of precedence: Pietro Bembo, Michelangelo, Mellin de Saint-Gelais, Vittoria Colonna, Clément Marot, Garcilaso de la Vega, Giovanni della Casa, Thomas Wyatt, Henry Howard, Joachim du Bellay, Edmund Spenser, Philip Sidney, and Bálint Balassi. Thus, in Pietro Bembo's book Prose of the Vernacular Tongue (1525) Petrarch is the model of verse composition.

== Legacy ==
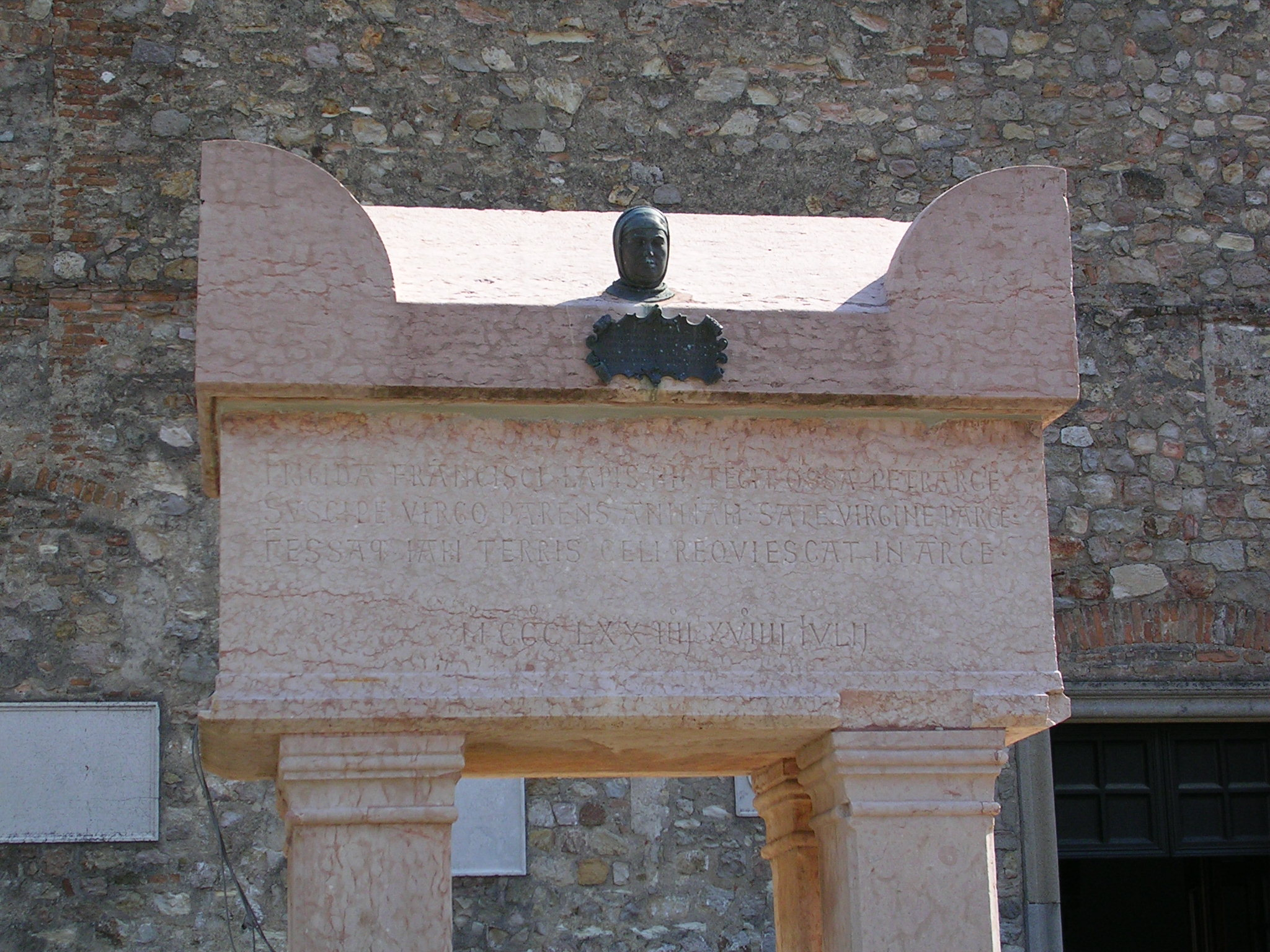
Petrarch's tomb at Arquà Petrarca

Petrarch's influence is evident in the works of Serafino Ciminelli from Aquila (1466–1500) and in the works of Marin Držić (1508–1567) from Dubrovnik.

The Romantic composer Franz Liszt set three of Petrarch's Sonnets (47, 104, and 123) to music for voice, Tre sonetti del Petrarca, which he later would transcribe for solo piano for inclusion in the suite Années de Pèlerinage. Liszt also set a poem by Victor Hugo, "Oh! quand je dors" in which Petrarch and Laura are invoked as the epitome of erotic love.

While in Avignon in 1991, Modernist composer Elliott Carter completed his solo flute piece Scrivo in Vento which is in part inspired by and structured by Petrarch's Sonnet 212, Beato in sogno. It was premiered on Petrarch's 687th birthday. In 2004, Finnish composer Kaija Saariaho crafted a miniature for solo piccolo flute titled Dolce tormento, in which the flutist whispers fragments of Petrarch's Sonnet 132 into the instrument.

In November 2003, it was announced that pathological anatomists would be exhuming Petrarch's body from his casket in Arquà Petrarca, to verify 19th-century reports that he had stood 1.83 meters (about six feet), which would have been tall for his period. The team from the University of Padua also hoped to reconstruct his cranium to generate a computerized image of his features to coincide with his 700th birthday. The tomb had been opened previously in 1873 by Professor Giovanni Canestrini, also of Padua University. When the tomb was opened, the skull was discovered in fragments and a DNA test revealed that the skull was not Petrarch's, prompting calls for the return of Petrarch's skull.

The researchers are fairly certain that the body in the tomb is Petrarch's due to the fact that the skeleton bears evidence of injuries mentioned by Petrarch in his writings, including a kick from a donkey when he was 42.

=== Numismatics ===
He is credited with being the first and most famous aficionado of numismatics. He described visiting Rome and asking peasants to bring him ancient coins they would find in the soil which he would buy from them, and writes of his delight at being able to identify the names and features of Roman emperors.

== Works in English translation ==
- Africa, vol. 1–4, translated by Erik Z. D. Ellis (thesis; Baylor University, 2007).
- Bucolicum Carmen, translated by Thomas G. Bergin (Yale University Press, 1974). ISBN 9780300017243
- The Canzoniere; or, Rerum vulgarium fragmenta, translated by Mark Musa (Indiana University Press, 1996). ISBN 9780253213174
- Invectives, translated by David Marsh (Harvard University Press, 2008). ISBN 9780674030886
- Itinerarium: A Proposed Route for a Pilgrimage from Genoa to the Holy Land, translated by H. James Shey (Binghamton, New York: Global Academic Publishers, 2004). ISBN 9781586840228
- Letters on Familiar Matters (Rerum familiarium libri), vol. 1 (bkk. 1–8), vol. 2 (bkk. 9–16), vol. 3 (bkk. 17–24), translated by Aldo S. Bernardo (New York: Italica Press, 2005). ISBN 9781599100005
- Letters of Old Age (Rerum senilium libri), vol. 1 (bkk. 1–9), vol. 2 (bkk. 10–18), translated by Aldo S. Bernardo, Saul Levin, & Reta A. Bernardo (New York: Italica Press, 2005). ISBN 9781599100043
- The Life of Solitude, translated by Jacob Zeitlin (1924); revised edition by Scott H. Moore (Baylor University Press 2023). ISBN 9781481318099
- My Secret Book (Secretum), translated by Nicholas Mann (Harvard University Press, 2016). ISBN 9780674003460
- On Religious Leisure (De otio religioso), translated by Susan S. Schearer (New York: Italica Press, 2002). ISBN 9780934977111
- Penitential Psalms and Prayers, translated by Demetrio S. Yocum (University of Notre Dame Press, 2024). ISBN 9780268207847
- Remedies for Fortune Fair and Foul, translated by Conrad H. Rawski (Indiana University Press, 1991). ISBN 9780253348449
- The Revolution of Cola di Rienzo, translated by Mario E. Cosenza; 3rd revised edition by Ronald G. Musto (New York: Italica Press, 1996). ISBN 9780934977005
- Selected Letters, vol. 1 & 2, translated by Elaine Fantham (Harvard University Press, 2017). ISBN 9780674058347, ISBN 978-0674971622

== See also ==
- Otium
