= Secretum (book) =

14th-century work by Petrarch examining his faith

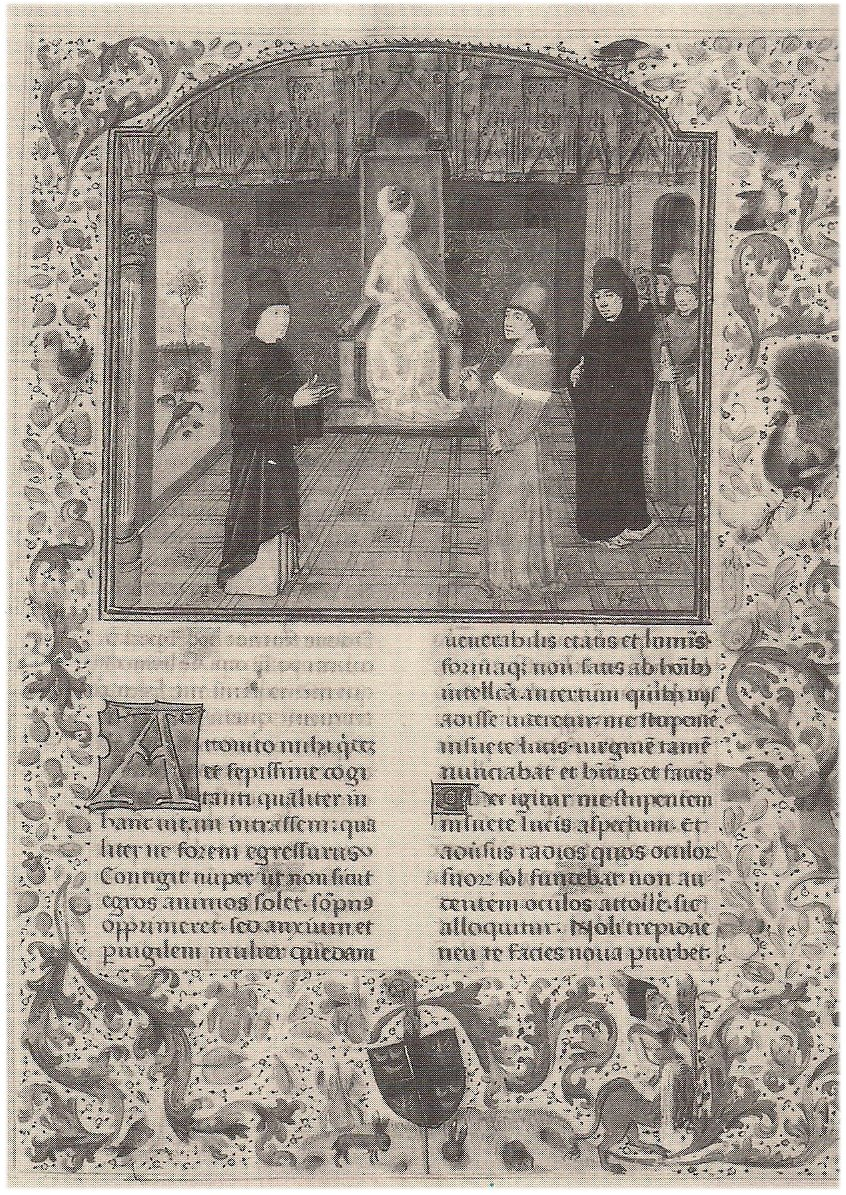
Petrarch's Secretum frontispiece Petrarch, Veritas (Truth), Augustine and Abbot Crabbe with two attendants

Secretum (De secreto conflictu curarum mearum, translated as The Secret or My Secret Book) is a trilogy of dialogues in Latin written by Petrarch sometime from 1342 to 1353, in which he examines his faith with the help of Saint Augustine, and "in the presence of The Lady Truth". Secretum was not circulated until some time after Petrarch's death, and was probably meant to be a means of self-examination during "the crisis of his middle years" more than a work to be published and read by others.

The dialogue opens with Augustine chastising Petrarch for ignoring his own mortality and his fate in the afterlife by not devoting himself fully to God. Petrarch concedes that this lack of piety is the source of his unhappiness, but he insists that he cannot overcome it. The dialogue then turns to the question of Petrarch's seeming lack of free will, and Augustine explains that it is his love for temporal things (specifically Laura), and his pursuit of fame through poetry that "bind his will in adamantine chains".

Petrarch's turn towards religion in his later life was inspired in part by Augustine's Confessions, and Petrarch imitates Augustine's style of self-examination and harsh self-criticism in Secretum. The ideas expressed in the dialogues are taken mostly from Augustine, particularly the importance of free will in achieving faith. Other notable influences include Cicero and other Pre-Christian thinkers.

Secretum has often been seen as Petrarch's attempt to reconcile his Renaissance humanism and admiration of the classical world with his Christian faith. Especially important are his rejection of love for temporal things not because it is a sin, but because it prevents him from knowing the eternal, a position that resembles classical philosophy rather than contemporaneous Christian theology. In line with this, Secretum quotes classical writers much more frequently than scripture. This in itself qualifies the Christian claim to singular authority. Andreas Dorschel argues that in the dialogue, Petrarch upholds his claim "Certain traits in me are unique" ("in me autem singularia quedam sunt") in spite of all moral chastising in the name of faith.

== List of authorities cited ==
- St. Augustine
  - Confessions
- Cicero
  - Academica
  - De amicitia
  - De finibus bonorum et malorum
  - De Senectute
  - Epistulae ad Atticum
  - Pro Marcello
  - Tusculanae Disputationes
- Horace
  - Epistles
  - Odes
- Juvenal
  - Satires
- Macrobius
  - Saturnalia
- Ovid
  - Amores
  - Epistulae ex Ponto
  - Metamorphoses
  - Remedia Amoris

- Petrarch
  - Africa
  - Epistles
  - Penitential Psalms
- Seneca the Elder
  - Declamations
- Seneca the Younger
  - De Beneficiis
  - De Tranquillitate Animi
  - Epistles
  - Naturales quaestiones
- Suetonius
  - De vita Caesarum
- Terence
  - Andria
  - Eunuchus
  - Phormio
- Virgil
  - Aeneid (26 times)
  - Eclogues
  - Georgics
- Scripture
  - Book of Wisdom
  - Psalm 84
  - Second Epistle to the Corinthians
