= Il Canzoniere =

Poetry anthology by Petrarch

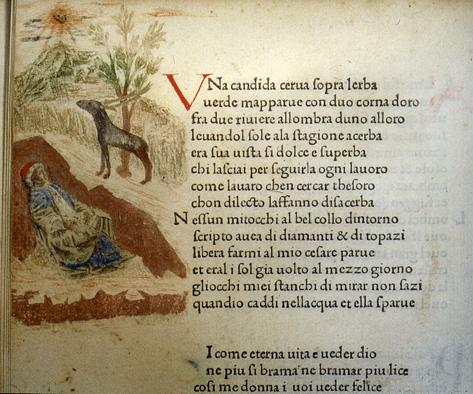
After printing, early versions of the Canzoniere were illuminated with pictures.

Il Canzoniere (Italian pronunciation: [il kantsoˈnjɛːre]; English: Song Book), also known as the Rime Sparse (English: Scattered Rhymes), but originally titled Rerum vulgarium fragmenta (English: Fragments of common things, that is Fragments composed in vernacular), is a collection of poems written in the Italian language by Petrarch.

Though the majority of Petrarch's output was in Latin, the Canzoniere was written in the vernacular, a language of trade, despite Petrarch's view that Italian was less adequate for expression. Of its 366 poems, the vast majority are in sonnet form (317), though the sequence contains a number of canzoni (29), sestine (9), madrigals (4), and ballate (7). Its central theme is the poet's love for Laura, a woman Petrarch allegedly met on April 6, 1327, in the Church of Sainte Claire in Avignon. Though disputed, the inscription in his copy of Virgil records this information. Petrarch's meticulous dating of his manuscripts has allowed scholars to deduce that the poems were written over a period of forty years, with the earliest dating from shortly after 1327, and the latest around 1368. The transcription and ordering of the sequence itself went on until 1374, the year of the poet's death. The two sections of the sequence which are divided by Laura's death have traditionally been labelled 'In vita' (In life') and 'In morte' (In death) respectively, though Petrarch made no such distinction. His work would go on to become what Spiller calls 'the single greatest influence on the love poetry of Renaissance Europe until well into the seventeenth century'.

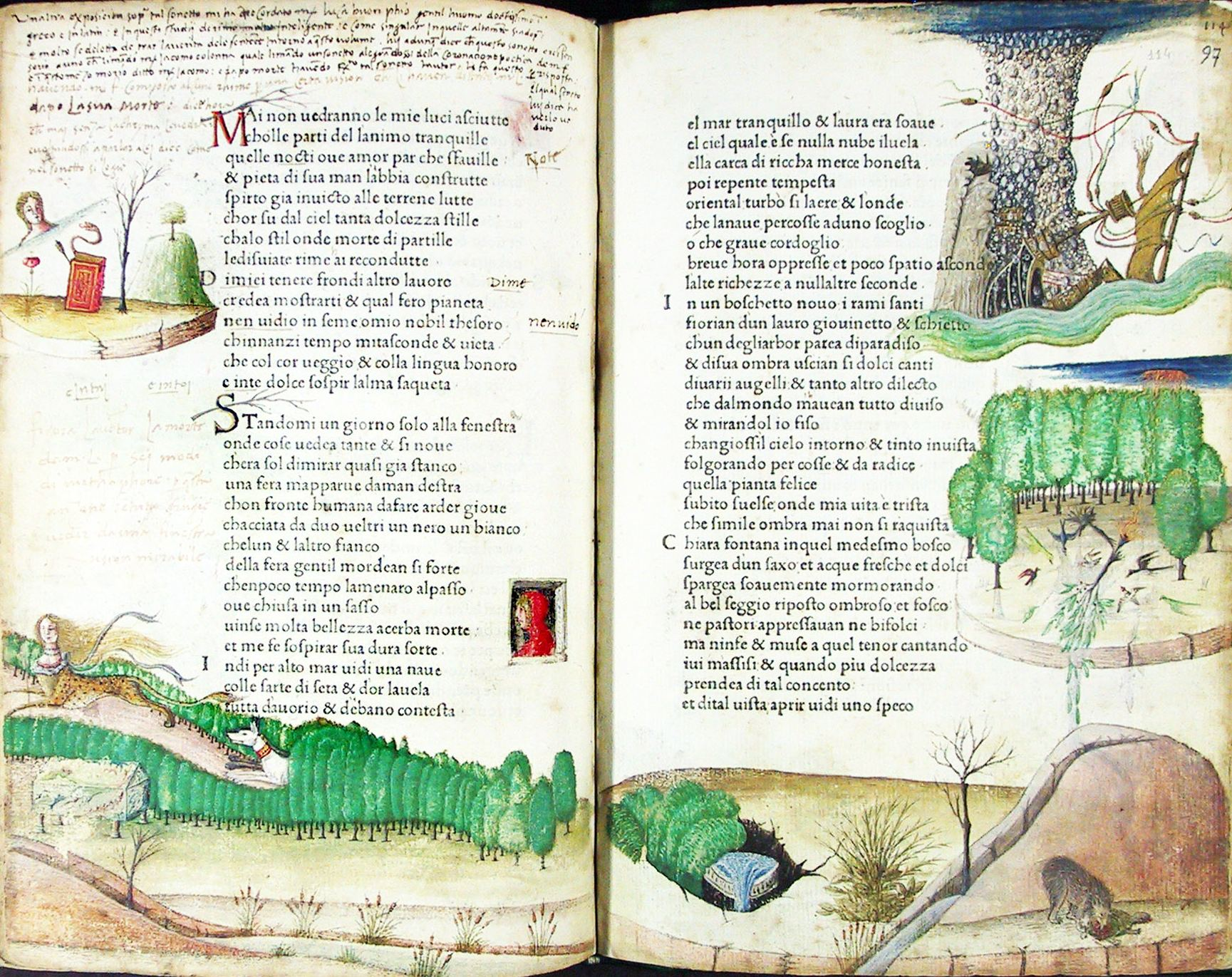
Two printed pages with the beginning of Petrarch's Canzone 323, Standomi Un Giorno, along with commentary and illustrations which were added later. Petrarch is depicted at his window, overlooking the first of his six visions. Others are also depicted.(1390s)

== Central ideas ==
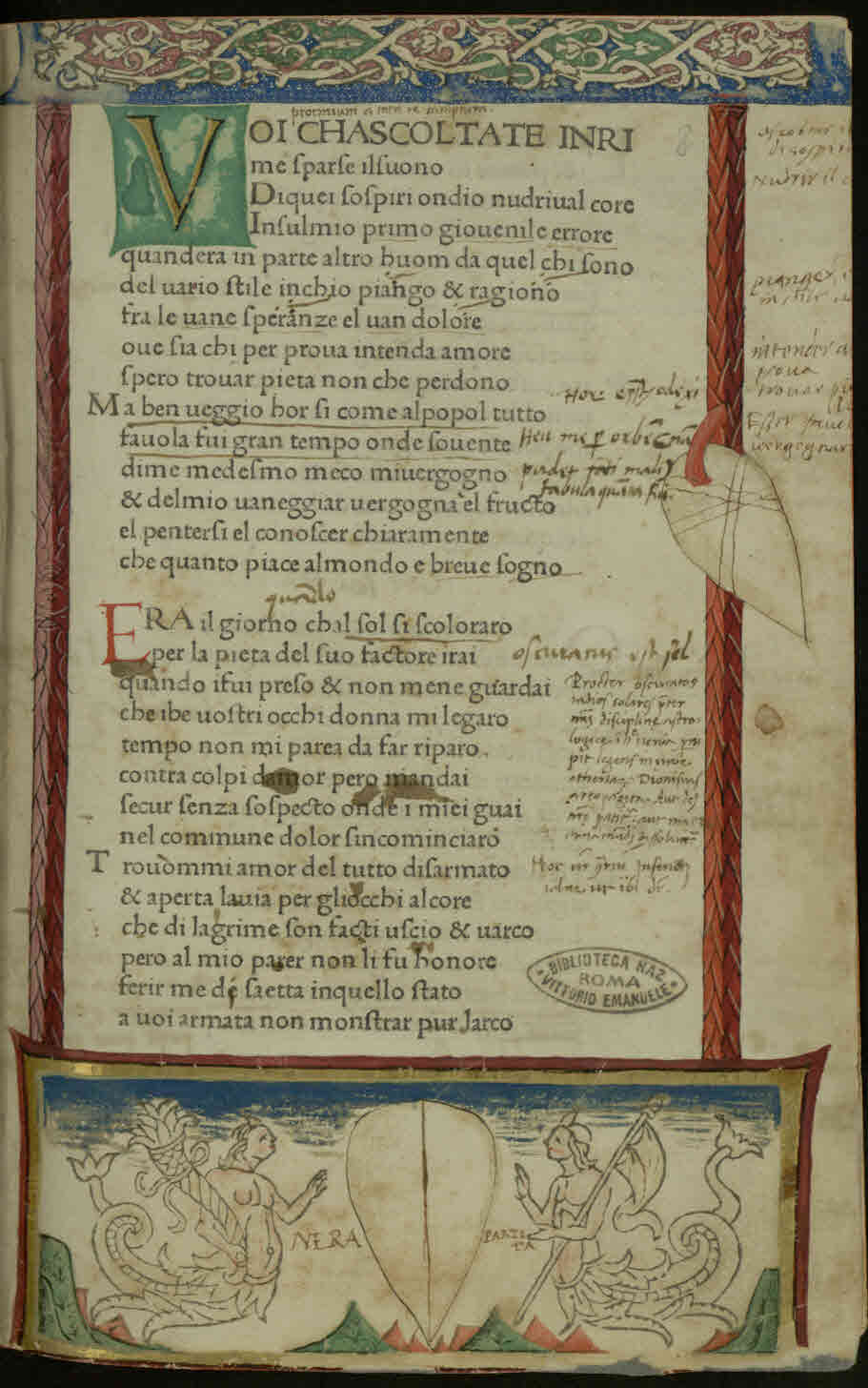
1470

The central theme in the Canzoniere is Petrarch's courtly love for Laura, with whom he reportedly fell in love at first sight on 6 April 1327 and who died on that date in 1348. The poems however are so sparing of facts that Petrarch had to write his friend Giacomo Colonna to assert her existence against a charge that she was a fictional creation.

The most evident purpose of the Canzoniere is to praise Laura, yet questions concerning the virtue of love in relation to the Christian religion and desire are always present. Antithesis are also key to the sequence and in one sense represent Petrarch's search for balance; these would later be exploited by Petrarchists in Europe but represent only one aspect of the Rimes. This leads on to the essential paradox of Petrarchan love, where love is desired yet painful: fluctuation between states is a means of expressing this instability. The changing mind of man and the passing of time are also central themes, as is the consideration of the art of poetic creation itself. Some other themes are desire, isolation, unrequited love, and vanity of youth.

In any case, it would be improper to see Canzoniere as uniquely inspired by love for Laura. Other themes are important: religion, poetry, politics, time, glory. The love theme itself should be considered as the nucleus around which Petrarch develops his deep psychological analysis: thanks to his poems inspired by Laura (laurus is the symbol for poetry) the poet aspires to reach glory, which in turn can fight the all-destroying power of time. Even glory, however, cannot guarantee real eternity, because in Christianity, only faith in Jesus Christ can guarantee it.

== Influences on the Canzoniere ==
Petrarch uses Ovid's Metamorphoses to convey themes of instability, and also sources Virgil's Aeneid. Petrarch inherited aspects of artifice and rhetorical skill from Sicilian courtly poetry, including that of the inventor of the sonnet form, Giacomo da Lentini. In addition, the troubadours who wrote love poems concerned with chivalry in Provençal (in the canso or canzone form) are likely to have had an influence, primarily because of the position of adoration in which they placed the female figure. Dante, and the school of the dolce stil nuovo, or new sweet style, developed this placement of the woman and proposed that the pursuit of love was a noble virtue.

== Influence of the Rime ==
=== In England ===
In 1380, Chaucer adopted part of the Canzoniere to form three stanzas of rhyme royal in Troilus and Criseyde, Book I. Over 150 years would pass until Sir Thomas Wyatt and Henry Howard, Earl of Surrey, would translate several Rime in the court environment of Henry VIII. Their translations are largely credited with making the ten-syllable line normative in English, and in George Puttenham's 1589 Art of English Poesie are credited with reforming the English language:

As novices newly crept out of the schooles of Dante, Arioste and Petrarch, they greatly polished our rude and homely manner of vulgar poesie, from that it had bene before, and for that cause may justly be sayd the first reformers of our English meetre and stile.

Thus, their translations of Rimes from the Canzoniere paved the way for the sonnet sequences of Sidney and Shakespeare.

=== In France ===
Early French sonneteers included Clément Marot and Mellin Saint Gelais. The latter spent nine years in Italy before returning to France to spread knowledge of Petrarch and Serafino. The first sonnet sequence to be published in France came in 1549 in the form of Joachim du Bellay's L'Olive. When first published it contained 50 sonnets but the next year Bellay added more poems and raised the total number to 115 - references to Petrarch are made in fourteen of these sonnets. Pierre de Ronsard also took up Petrarch's influence and his sonnets are credited for their originality.
