= Incisa in Val d'Arno =

- Frazione
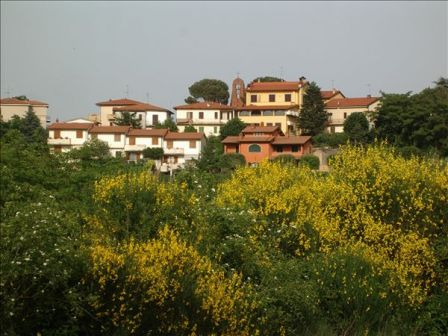
- Poggio alla Croce

- Location of Incisa in Val d'Arno in Italy
- Coordinates: 43°39′N 11°26′E
- Country: Italy
- Region: Tuscany
- Metropolitan city: Florence (FI)
- Comune: Figline e Incisa Valdarno
- Elevation: 122 m (400 ft)

Population (1 January 2007)
  - Total: 5,967
- Demonym: Incisani
- Time zone: UTC+1 (CET)
  - Summer (DST): UTC+2 (CEST)
- Postal code: 50064
- Dialing code: 055
- Website: Official website

Incisa in Val d'Arno is a frazione of the comune (municipality) of Figline e Incisa Valdarno, in the Metropolitan City of Florence, Tuscany, central Italy, located about 20 kilometres (12 mi) southeast of Florence. It was a separate comune until 1 January 2014.

The church of St. Alexander houses a fragmentary triptych by Andrea di Giusto. The Renaissance poet Petrarch grew up in Incisa, although he was born in Arezzo.
