= Laura de Noves =

14th-century noblewoman

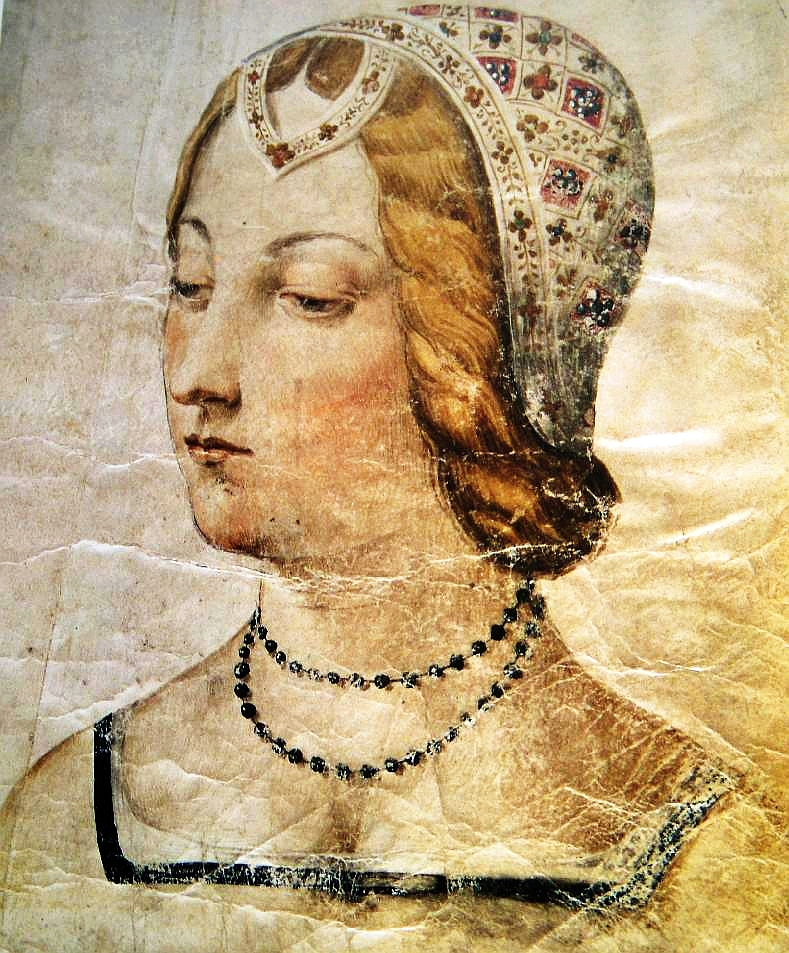
- Born: c. 1310
- Died: 1348

Laura de Noves (c. 1310–1348) was the wife of Count Hugues de Sade (ancestor of the Marquis de Sade). It has been speculated that she may be the Laura of Petrarch's poetry, but this remains unproven.
