= Africa (Petrarch) =

Epic poem by Petrarch

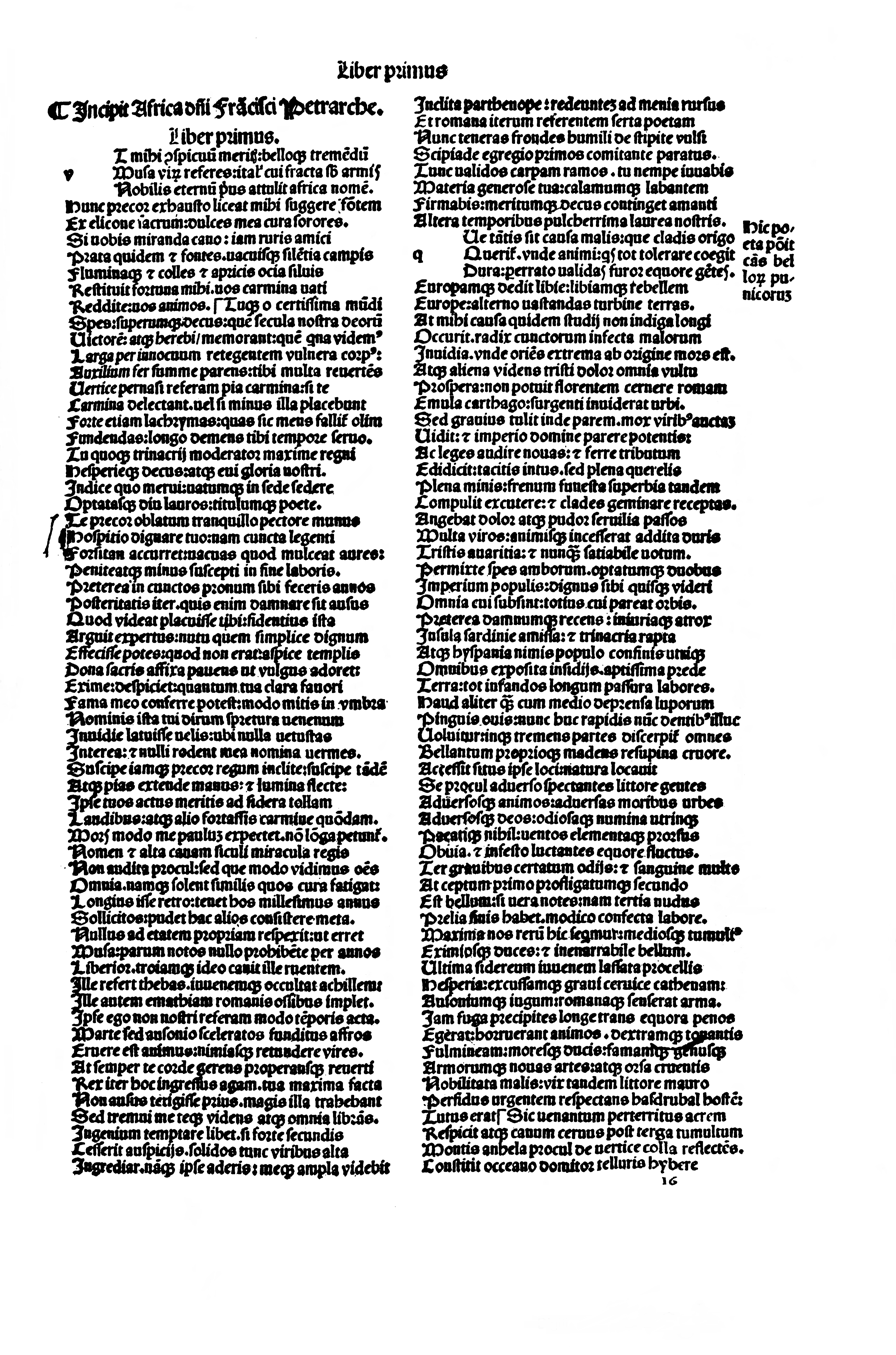
First page of the 1501 edition of Petrarch's Africa

Africa is an epic poem in Latin hexameters by the 14th-century Italian poet Petrarch (Francesco Petrarca). It tells the story of the Second Punic War, in which the Carthaginian general Hannibal invaded Italy, but Roman forces were eventually victorious after an invasion of north Africa led by Scipio Africanus, the poem's hero. Noteworthy passages include the death of Hannibal's brother Mago Barca, the description of Syphax's palace, and the tragic love story of Sophonisba.

The first sections of Africa were written in the valley of Vaucluse after Petrarch's first visit to Rome in 1337. A draft of the poem was completed by about 1343, but Petrarch continued to revise it, and the text was not made public until 1397, three decades after his death. It was dedicated to Robert of Naples, king of Sicily. It was first printed, as part of Petrarch's collected works, at Venice in 1501. Petrarch set great store by Africa and his other classicizing works, but the epic was not particularly well-received because of the literary transposition from Livy.

== See Also ==
- Punica (poem)
