= Cardinals created by Urban V =

Catholic appointments from 1366 to 1370

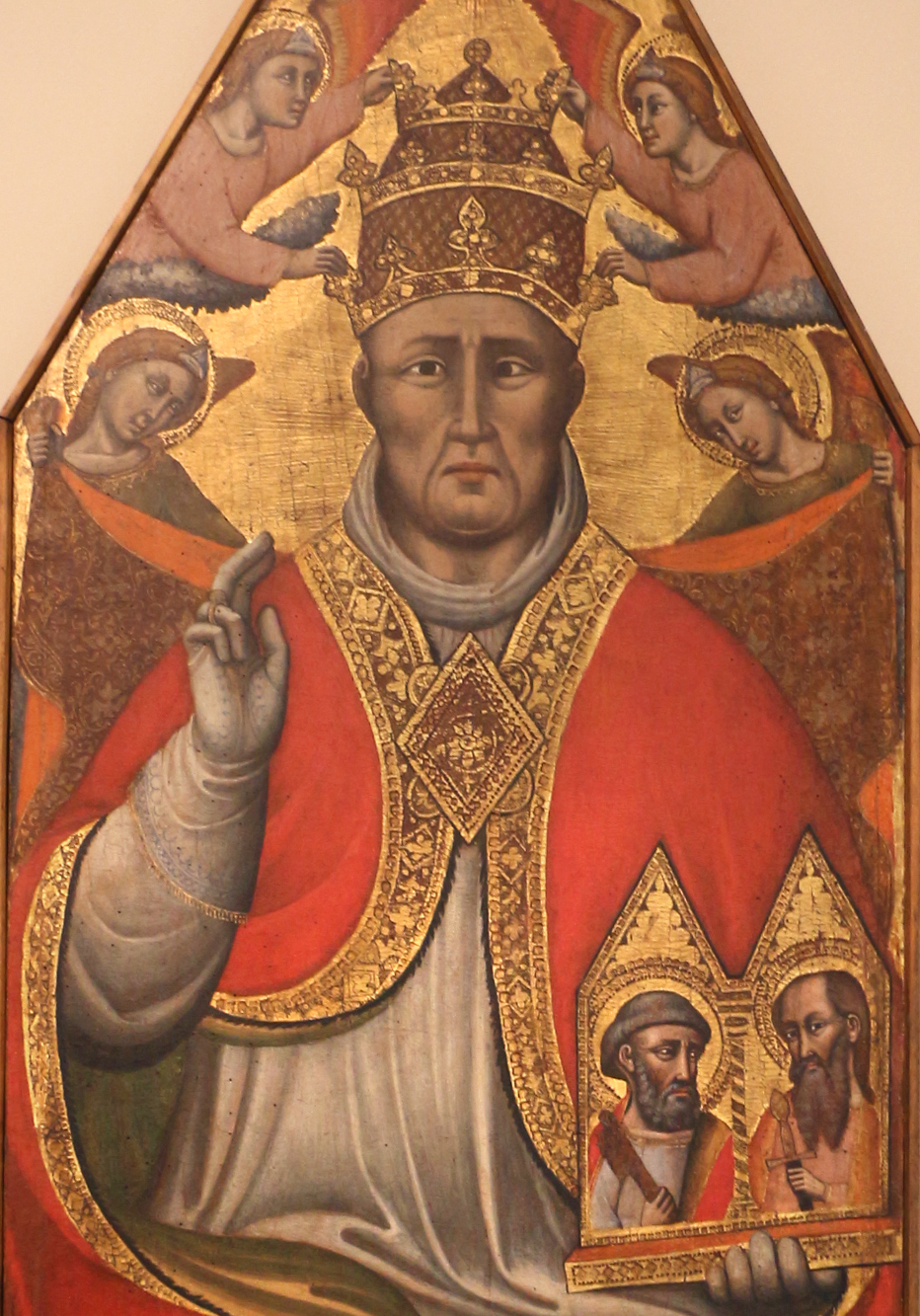
Pope Urban V (r. 1362–1370)

Pope Urban V (r. 1362–1370) created thirteen new cardinals in four consistories.

== 18 September 1366 ==
- Angelic de Grimoard, C.R.S.A., brother of the Pope, bishop of Avignon – cardinal-priest of San Pietro in Vincoli, then cardinal-bishop of Albano (17 September 1367), † 13 April 1388
- Guillaume de la Sudrie, O.P., bishop of Marseille – cardinal-priest of SS. Giovanni e Paolo (received the title on 27 września 1366), then cardinal-bishop of Ostia e Velletri (17 September 1367), † 18 April 1373.
- Marco da Viterbo, O.F.M., master general of the Order of Friars Minor – cardinal-priest of Santa Prassede (received the title on 14 December 1367), † 4 September 1369.

== 12 May 1367 ==
- Guillaume d'Aigrefeuille, O.S.B.Clun. – cardinal-priest of S. Stefano al Monte Celio, † 13 January 1401

== 22 September 1368 ==
- Philippe de Cabassole, patriarch of Jerusalem – cardinal-priest of SS. Marcellino e Pietro (received the title on 4 June 1369), then cardinal-bishop of Sabina (31 May 1370), † 27 August 1372.
- Simon Langham, O.S.B., archbishop of Canterbury – cardinal-priest of S. Sisto (received the title on 24 May 1369), then cardinal-bishop of Palestrina (August 1373), † 22 July 1376.
- Bernard du Bosquet, archbishop of Naples – cardinal-priest of SS. XII Apostoli (received the title on 31 October 1368), † 19 April 1371.
- Jean de Dormans, bishop of Beauvais – cardinal-priest of SS. IV Coronati (received the title in 1371), † 7 November 1373.
- Étienne de Poissy, bishop of Paris – cardinal-priest of S. Eusebio (received the title on 13 February 1369), † 17 October 1373.
- Pierre de Banac, bishop of Castres – cardinal-priest of S. Lorenzo in Damaso, † 7 October 1369.
- Francesco Tebaldeschi – cardinal-priest of S. Sabina (received the title on 20 October 1368), † 6 September 1378.

Urban V intended also to elevate to the cardinalate patriarch of Alexandria Arnaud Bernard du Pouget, but this nomination did not take effect due to the sudden death of the patriarch.

== 7 June 1370 ==
- Pierre d'Estaing, O.S.B., archbishop of Bourges – cardinal-priest of S. Maria in Trastevere (received the title on 28 June 1370), then cardinal-bishop of Ostia e Velletri (28 September 1373), † 25 November 1377.
- Pietro Corsini, bishop of Florence – cardinal-priest of S. Lorenzo in Damaso, then cardinal-bishop of Porto e S. Rufina (1374), † 16 August 1405

== Sources ==
- Konrad Eubel: Hierarchia Catholica, I, 1913
- G. Mollat, E. Blauze: Vitae paparum avenionensium, I-II, Paris, 1914-1928
- Miranda, Salvador. "Consistories for the creation of Cardinals, 14th Century (1303-1404): Urban V (1362-1370)". The Cardinals of the Holy Roman Church. Florida International University. OCLC 53276621.
