= Peace of Bologna (1370) =

The Peace of Bologna was a treaty concluded on 23 November 1370 between the commune of Perugia and Pope Urban V. It ended Perugia's attempt to establish itself as an independent state and confirmed its submission to papal authority.

== Background ==
In the mid-14th century Perugia sought to expand its territorial influence, supported by the political theories of the jurist Bartolus de Saxoferrato. This brought the city into conflict with the Papal States.

To stabilize central Italy, Pope Urban V in April 1370 promoted a league of Italian powers—including Florence, Bologna, Reggio, Pisa, Lucca, the Este of Ferrara, the Carrara of Padua, and the Gonzaga of Mantua. Negotiations with Perugia were entrusted to the pope's brother, Cardinal Anglic Grimoard, acting as papal legate.

== The Treaty ==
The treaty was signed at Bologna on 23 November 1370. Perugia formally recognized itself as subject to the Church “from always and forever.” The city appointed four envoys—Conte Sacchi, Baldo di Francesco, Pietro Vincioli, and Angelino Ceccoli—to present its submission.

A contemporary Perugian chronicle records that the envoys appeared before Cardinal Grimoard at Bologna, confessed the city's “rebellion,” and were absolved and reconciled to the Holy See.

The agreement also established the office of a papal legate within Perugia's communal government, symbolizing the curtailment of civic autonomy. In practice it marked the end of Perugia's free commune and its incorporation into the Papal States.
