= Pierre d'Ornellas =

French Catholic prelate

Monsignor Pierre d'Ornellas
- Archbishop of Rennes, Dol and Saint-Malo
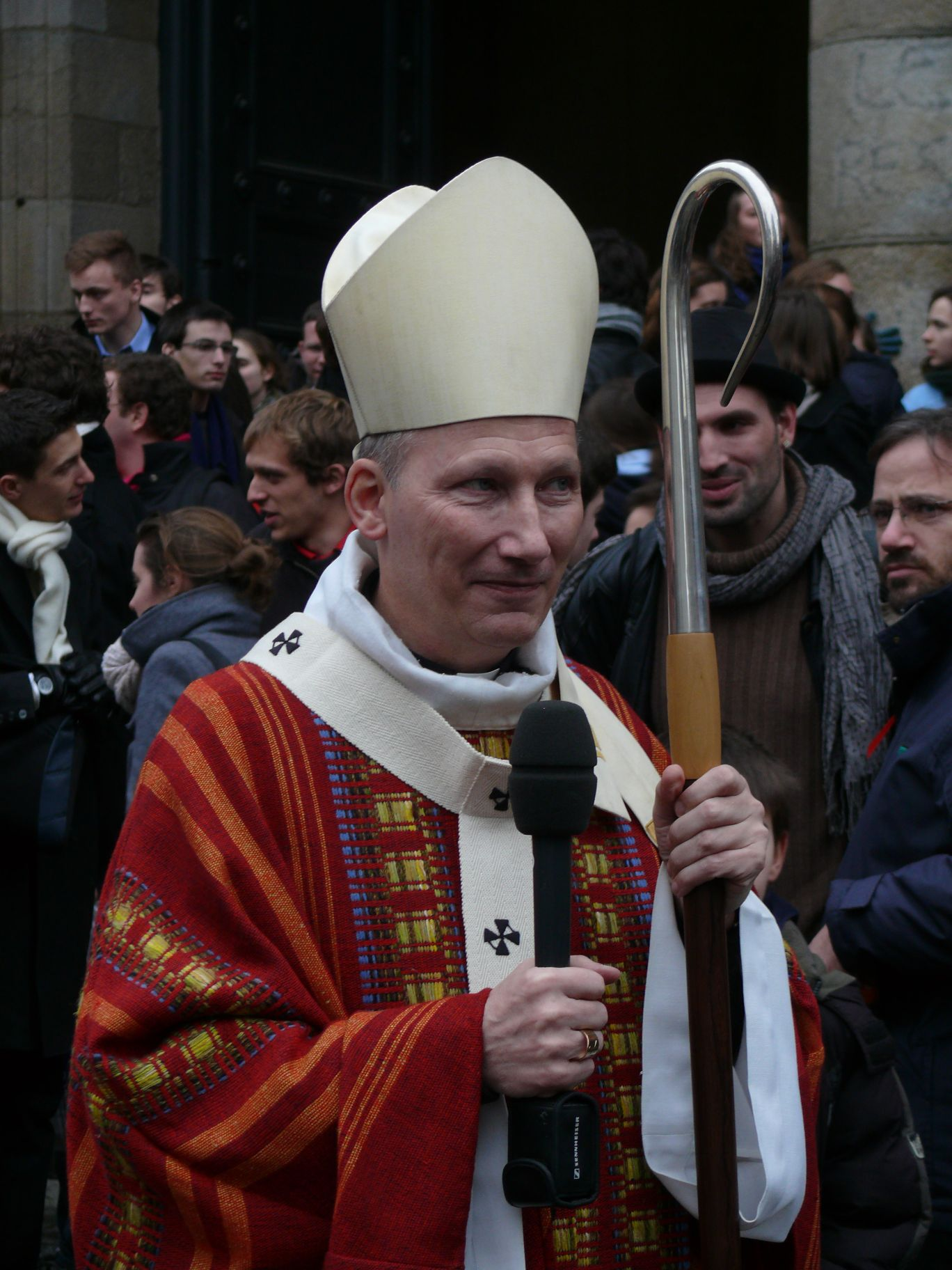
- Ornellas in 2012
- Church: Catholic Church
- Archdiocese: Rennes, Dol and Saint-Malo
- Installed: 26 March 2007
- Predecessor: François Saint-Macary
- Previous posts: Auxiliary Bishop of Paris (1997–2006); Titular Bishop of Naraggara (1997–2006); Coadjutor Archbishop of Rennes, Dol and Saint-Malo (2006–2007)

Orders
- Ordination: 15 August 1984
- Consecration: 10 October 1997 by Jean-Marie Lustiger

Personal details
- Born: 9 May 1953 (age 73) Paris, French Fourth Republic
- Coat of arms: Pierre d'Ornellas's coat of arms

Ordination history
History
Episcopal consecration
- Principal consecrator: Jean-Marie Lustiger
- Co-consecrators: Claude Frikart, Raymond Bouchex
Episcopal succession
Bishops consecrated by Pierre d'Ornellas as principal consecrator
- Thierry Scherrer: 6 July 2008
- Emmanuel Delmas: 28 September 2008
- Nicolas Souchu: 18 January 2009
- Denis Moutel: 10 October 2010
- Alexandre Joly: 10 February 2019
- Jean Bondu: 22 January 2023
- Matthieu Dupont: 9 March 2024

Pierre Paul Oscar d'Ornellas (born 9 May 1953) is a French Roman Catholic prelate. He has been the archbishop of the Archdiocese of Rennes, Dol and Saint-Malo since 2007.
