= Guillaume de Chanac (died 1348) =

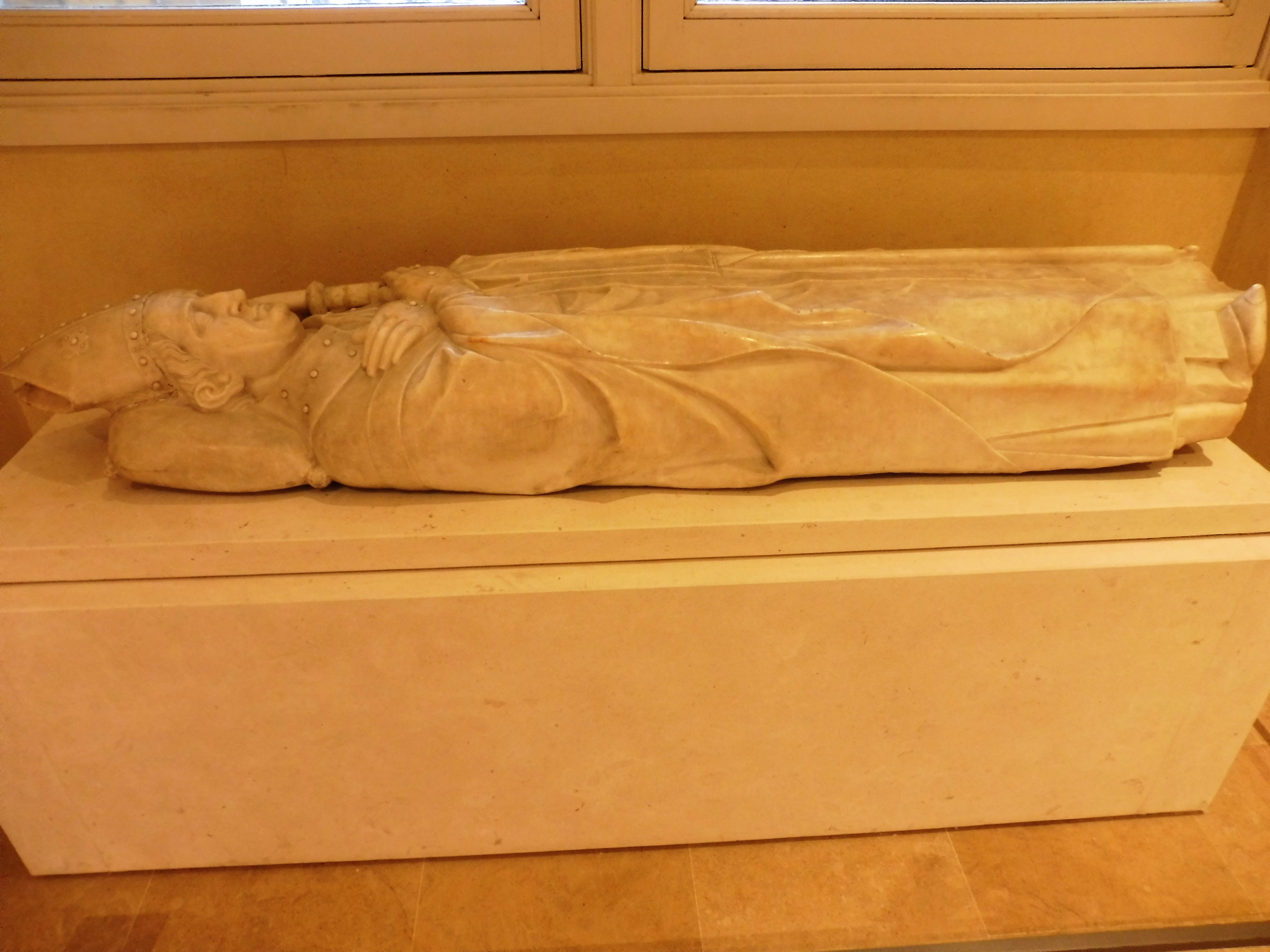
- Guillaume's effigy, now exposed at the Louvre

Personal details
- Died: 1348

Bishop of Paris
- In office 1332–1342
- Preceded by: Hugues Michel de Besançon
- Succeeded by: Foulques de Chanac

Latin patriarch of Alexandria
- In office 1342–1348
- Preceded by: John of Aragon
- Succeeded by: Humbert II of Viennois

Guillaume de Chanac (died 1348) was bishop of Paris from 1332 until 1342 and then latin patriarch of Alexandria until his death.

== Life ==
He was born in Allassac in the from an illustrious family of Limousin, being a relative of Guillaume de Chanac. He studied law before becoming a functionary of Guillaume de Baufet, bishop of Paris. He was then nominated archdeacon of Notre-Dame and bishop on the 18th of August 1332.

In 1335 he confirmed the foundation of the Collège de Bourgogne. In the same year, the canons of Paris were declared independent from the bishop's authority.

On the 20th of September 1342 he met Clement VI in Avignon and asked to be relieved of the episcopal see, to which he recommended his nephew, Foulques de Chanac. Clement satisfied his request and made him latin patriarch of Alexandria, a merely titular see.

Guillaume died the 5th of May 1348.

Catholic Church titles
Preceded by Hugues Michel de Besançon	Bishop of Paris; 1332 - 1342	Succeeded by Foulques de Chanac
Preceded by John of Aragon	Latin patriarch of Alexandria; 1342 - 1348	Succeeded by Humbert II of Viennois
