= Aymeric de Magnac =

Bishop of Paris from 1368 to 1383

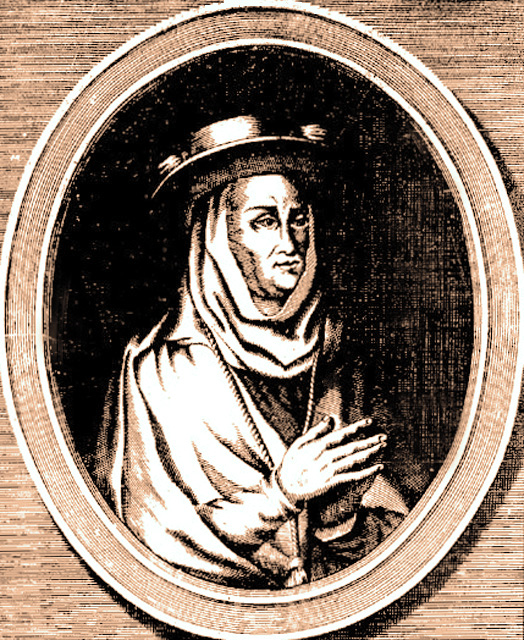

Orders
- Created cardinal: 23 December 1383 by Antipope Clement VII

Personal details
- Died: 21 March 1385

Bishop of Paris
- In office 1368–1383
- Preceded by: Etienne de Poissy
- Succeeded by: Pierre d'Orgemont

Aymeric de Magnac (died 1385) was Bishop of Paris from 1368 to 1383 when he was elected pseudocardinal by Antipope Clement VII.

== Life ==
Aymeric was born Saint-Junien from a noble family of Limousin. He was a professor of law and later canon and deacon of Paris before being appointed bishop in 1368. In 1374 was named executor of Charles V's testament, being one of his advisers.

In 1381, Aymeric arrested and trialed Hugues Aubriot who, however, managed to avoid the death penalty. Aubriot was later freed during the Harelle, which forced the bishop to flee the city.

In the concistory of the 23rd of December 1383, Aymeric was elected pseudocardinal and priest of Sant'Eusebio by Antipope Clement VII.

Aymeric died the 21st of March 1385.

Catholic Church titles
Preceded by Etienne de Poissy	Bishop of Paris; 1368 – 1383	Succeeded by Pierre d'Orgemont
