= William Grisaunt =

English physician

William Grisaunt, also called William English (fl. 1350), was an English physician.

Grisaunt as a young man taught philosophy at Oxford University, and in 1299 was either fellow or student of Merton College. He incurred the suspicion of having practised magic, and when of mature age left England and studied medicine at Montpelier. He afterwards settled at Marseilles, where he acquired great fame as a physician; he is said in his practice to have paid special attention to the nature and cause of the disease and to the constitution of the patient. Grisaunt is commonly stated to have been the father of Grimoald or Grimoard (1309-1370), abbot of St. Victor at Marseilles, who became pope as Urban V in 1362. In a contemporary chronicle (Chr. Angliæ ab anno 1328 usque ad annum 1388, p. 52, Rolls Ser.) Urban, who is there called Gillerinus, is said to have been the son of an Englishman. But his latest biographer (Magnan, Histoire d'Urbain V see also Bower, Lives of the Popes, vii. 3, and Fleury, Hist. Eccl. xx. 201) makes him son of William Grimoard, lord of Grisac in Gevaudin, who died in 1366, aged 99, and there are extant grants of John II and Charles V of France to this William Grimoard in which he is styled father of the pope (see Albanes, La Famille de Grimoard, p. 53).

Anglic Grimoard, Urban's brother, whom Godwin called Grimoaldus de Grisant, was made by him bishop of Avignon and cardinal bishop of Albano (Bower, vii. 3, and Chron. Angliæ, p. 53). According to Godwin, Anglic Grimoard is the cardinal John Anglicus, who was admitted dean of York 11 November 1366, and was deprived by the pope 1 May 1381 (Le Neve, Fasti, iii. 123).

Bale and Pits, following Boston of Bury, ascribe the following works to Grisaunt:

- ‘Speculum Astrologiæ.’
- ‘De Qualitatibus Astrorum.’
- ‘De Magnitudine Solis.’
- ‘De Quadratura Circuli.’
- ‘De Motu Capitis.’ Of all these they give the first words, but they are not now known to exist.

They also add:

- ‘De Significatione Astrorum.’
- ‘De Causa Ignorantiæ.’
- ‘De Judicio Patientis.’
- ‘De Urina non Visa,’ inc. ‘Ne ignorantiæ vel potius invidiæ;’ a treatise with this title is extant in manuscript at Hertford College, Oxford (Coxe, Cat. Cod. MSS. Coll. Oxon. Aul. B. Mariæ Magdalenæ, ii. 3, f. 39). The treatise in Cotton. MS. Vitellius C. iii. to which Tanner refers is in a hand of the early twelfth century, and therefore cannot be Grisaunt's.
