= Domingo Ram y Lanaja =

Aragonese politician and diplomat

Domenec Ram y Lanaja (1345 - 25 April 1445) was an Aragonese politician and diplomat who was Viceroy of Sicily in 1415–1419, succeeding Prince John of Aragon, later King John II of Aragon.

== Biography ==
He was born in Alcañiz, in what is now the province of Teruel.

He joined the Canons Regular of Saint Augustine, studying at the University of Lleida and receiving a doctorate in canon and civil law, then described as "utroque iure", in 1406. He was a Prior of the priests community serving the churches of Alcañiz in 1395, participating in the Courts of Aragon, in Zaragoza in 1395. In 1405, he was the collector of the Archdiocese of Zaragoza and as such, he set aside the funds for the papal court of Avignon.

On 1 August 1406 he was admitted by Antipope Benedict XIII as referendary of his chancery in Monaco. Prior of the church of San Salvador of Zaragoza in 1406, he would become a personal attendant of Antipope Benedict XIII at Perpignan, France, on 1 May 1407. The antipope sent him as "nuncio" to Spain, especially before King Martin I of Aragon, and he was one of the seven ambassadors sent by Benedict XIII at the beginning of 1409 to negotiate the abdication with the Council of Pisa and the papal court of Pope Gregory XII; the mission was a complete failure. In 1409, he attended the Council of Perpignan, being elected Bishop of Huesca on 5 May 1410.

The succession crisis on the Aragonese Royalty, circa 1412, prompted his choice to be one of the 3 representatives acting as Judges of the Aragonese Crown in June 1412 in what is described as the Caspe compromises to elect a new king. The outcome of it was the choice of the Castilian Prince, "Infante Fernando de Antequera", of ailing health, too, as was his brother king Henry III of Castile as new king Ferdinand I of Aragón, deceased however in 1416. He had been consecrated by Ram y Lanaja as a new king of Aragon on 15 January 1414. At the beginning of 1415, he was sent to Naples by the king of Aragón to arrange the final details of the marriage of Infante D. Juan of Aragón, later king John II of Aragon with Queen Joan II of Naples.

In 1415 he was invested a nuncio of Benedict XIII in Naples, Sicily, Sardinia, and Corsica; his mission was to convince Queen Joan II of Naples to join the obedience of Avignon Popes but at the last minute, the queen changed her mind and married French Prince Jacques de Bourbon and maintained her allegiance to Rome.

Domingo Ram was Viceroy of Aragonese Sicily from 1415 to 1419. He was transferred to the see of Lleida on 13 November 1415; one of his vicars general was Alfonso de Borja, future Pope Callixtus III. He participated in the Council of Lleida, inaugurated on 9 October 1418. He left the obedience of Avignon and joined the one of Rome. Created cardinal priest in secret in the secret consistory of 23 July 1423, with the title of Santi Giovanni e Paolo.

In 1424, he was the driving force of the Council of Tarragona, convoked to finish the last vestiges of the schism; in the name of the participants, he admonished King Alfonso V of Aragon for the support he was giving to schismatics of Peñíscola, those supporting Benedict and the measures he had taken against Pope Martin V, inspired on political reasons, such as the matter of Naples. Named president of the Generalitat of Catalonia on 14 July 1428. In September 1429, he had a very active part in the Council of Tortosa, along with Cardinal Pierre de Foix, papal legate, to end the remnants of the Western Schism; he responded to the inaugural address of the legate and intervened in the revision of the twenty-two constitutions of reform, among them a very important one concerning the catechism. Named administrator of the see of Lerida on 10 March 1430; occupied the post until 20 July 1435.

King Alfonso V named him the first of three ambassadors, who, together with the ambassadors of Navarra, negotiated a truce with the king of Castilla; the five-year truce was achieved near Soria on 16 July 1430 and publicly announced on the following 25 July. Did not participate in the conclave of 1431, which elected Pope Eugenius IV. Cardinal protoprete in March 1434. Administrator of the see of Tarragona from 25 August 1434. On 24 March 1435, together with Federico Ventimilia and Jaime Pelegrin, he requested for King Alfonso V of Aragón the investiture as king of Naples. He attended against the will of Pope Eugenius IV and entered the city on 10 July 1438.

He was added to the conciliar embassy sent to the Diet of Frankfurt on 23 February 1439. King Alfonso V accredited him as his ambassador at the Council of Basel in 1439; following the royal instructions, he strongly opposed the deposition of Pope Eugenius IV; for his participation in the council, the pope removed him as administrator of Tarragona but on 4 July 1440 the pontiff restored him in the post.

He was promoted to the metropolitan see of Tarragona on 4 July 1440, then he returned to Aragón as counsellor of King Alfonso V, who was at war with Castile. In 1444, he acted as arbiter to solve the differences between the kings of Castile and Navarre. In 1444 Pope Eugenius IV appointed him bishop of the suburbicarian see of Porto e Santa Rufina.

He died the following year in Rome, and was buried in the Basilica of St. John Lateran.
