= Archdiocese of Paris =

Latin Catholic archdiocese in France

Coordinates: 48.8533°N 2.34925°E

Archdiocese of Paris Archidioecesis Parisiensis Archidiocèse de Paris

Catholic
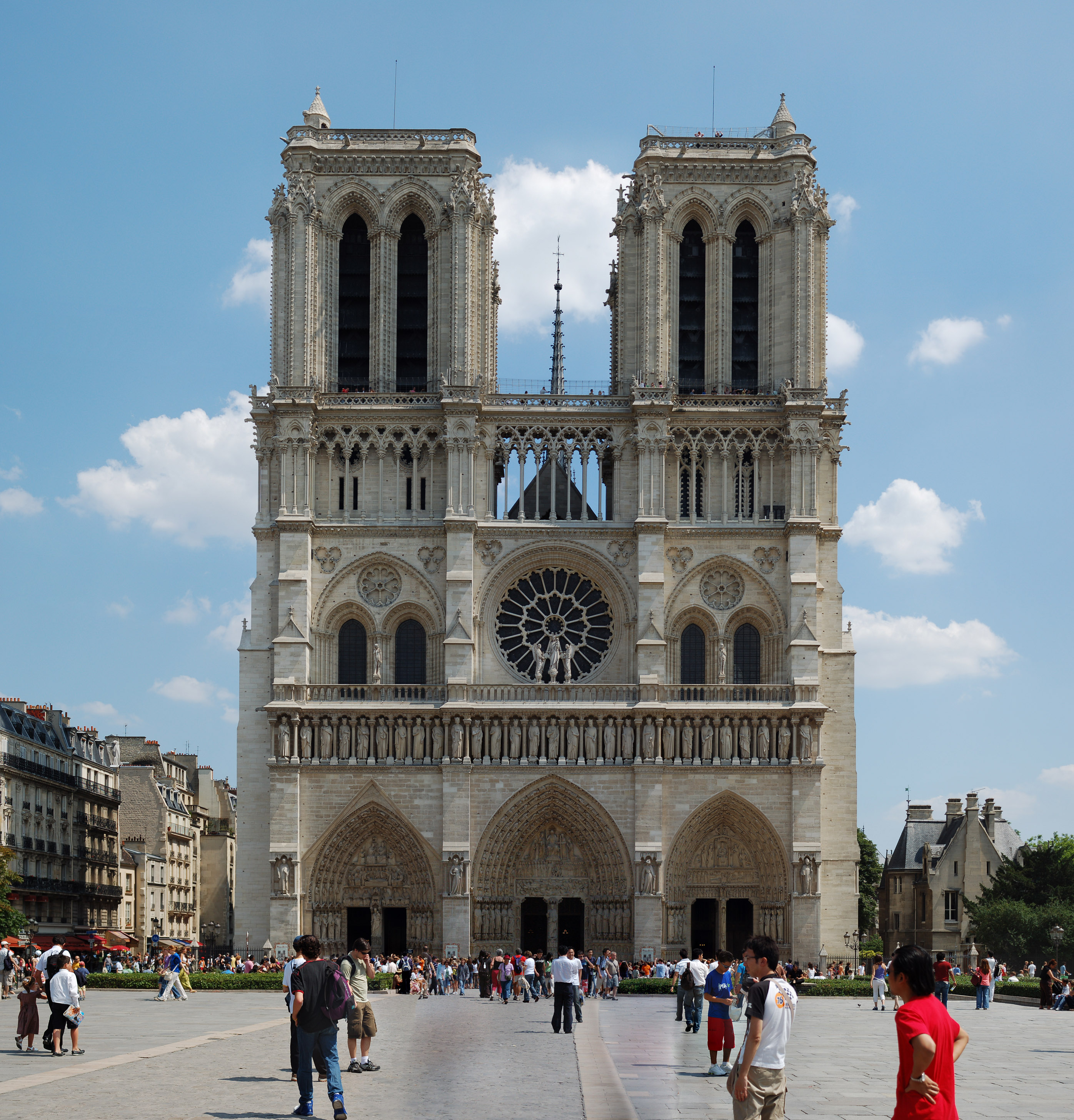
- Notre-Dame de Paris before the 2019 fire

- Coat of arms

Location
- Country: France

Statistics
- Area: 105.4 km^{2} (40.7 sq mi)
- Population: Total; Catholics: (as of 2021); 2,148,271; 1,304,700 (60.7%)
- Parishes: 106

Information
- Denomination: Catholic
- Sui iuris church: Latin Church
- Rite: Roman Rite
- Established: 3rd century (As Diocese of Paris); 1622 (As Archdiocese of Paris)
- Cathedral: Notre-Dame de Paris
- Patron saint: Saint Denis; Saint Genevieve
- Secular priests: 598 (Diocesan); 473 (Religious Orders); 133 Permanent Deacons

Current leadership
- Pope: Leo XIV
- Archbishop: Laurent Ulrich
- Suffragans: Créteil; Évry-Corbeil-Essonnes; Meaux; Nanterre; Pontoise; Saint-Denis; Versailles
- Auxiliary Bishops: Philippe Marsset; Emmanuel Tois
- Bishops emeritus: Michel Aupetit

Map

Website
- paris.catholique.fr

Ecclesiastical province of Paris

The Archdiocese of Paris (Latin: Archidioecesis Parisiensis; French: Archidiocèse de Paris) is a Latin Church ecclesiastical jurisdiction or archdiocese of the Catholic Church in France. It is one of twenty-three archdioceses in France. The original diocese is traditionally thought to have been created in the 3rd century by St. Denis and corresponded with the Civitas Parisiorum; it was elevated to an archdiocese on October 20, 1622. Before that date the bishops were suffragan to the archbishops of Sens.

== History ==
Paris was a Christian centre at an early date, its first apostles being St. Denis and his companions, Sts. Rusticus and Eleutherius. Until the Revolution the ancient tradition of the Parisian Church commemorated the seven stations of St. Denis, the stages of his apostolate and martyrdom:

- (1) the ancient monastery of Notre-Dame-des-Champs of which the crypt, it was said, had been dedicated to the Blessed Virgin by St. Denis on his arrival in Paris;
- (2) the Church of St-Etienne-des-Grès (now disappeared), which stood on the site of an oratory erected by St. Denis to St. Stephen;
- (3) the Church of St-Benoît (disappeared), where St. Denis had erected an oratory to the Trinity (Deus Benedictus);
- (4) the chapel of St-Denis-du-Pas near Notre-Dame (disappeared), on the site of the tribunal of the prefect Sicinnius, who tried St. Denis;
- (5) the Church of St-Denis-de-la-Châtre, the crypt of which was regarded as the saint's cell (now vanished);
- (6) Montmartre, where, according to the chronicle written in 836 by Abbot Hilduin, St. Denis was executed;
- (7) the Basilica of Saint-Denis.

Clovis founded, in honour of the Apostles Peter and Paul, a monastery to which the tomb of St. Genevieve drew numbers of the faithful, and in which St. Clotilde, who died at Tours, was buried.

To form a conception of Paris in the tenth and eleventh centuries, one must picture a network of churches and monasteries surrounded by cultivated farm-lands on the present site of Paris. From the beginning of the twelfth century, the monastic schools of Paris were already famous. The episcopate of Maurice de Sully (1160-96), the son of a simple serf, was marked by the consecration of the Cathedral of Notre-Dame.

The title of Duc de Saint-Cloud was created in 1674 for the archbishops.

Prior to 1790 the diocese was divided into three archdeaconries: France, Hurepoix, Brie.

Until the creation of new dioceses in 1966 there were two archdeaconries: Madeleine and St. Séverin. The reform reduced the diocese's size, losing the dioceses of Chartres, Orléans and Blois.

== Present day ==
Its suffragan dioceses, created in 1966 and encompassing the Île-de-France region, are Créteil, Evry-Corbeil-Essonnes, Meaux, Nanterre, Pontoise, Saint-Denis, and Versailles. Its liturgical centre is at Notre-Dame Cathedral in Paris. The archbishop resides on rue Barbet de Jouy in the 6th arrondissement, but there are diocesan offices in rue de la Ville-Eveque, rue St. Bernard and in other areas of the city. The archbishop is ordinary for Eastern Catholics (except Armenians and Ukrainians) in France.

The churches of the current diocese can be divided into several categories:

- i) Latin Church parishes. These are grouped into deaneries and subject to vicars-general who often coincide with auxiliary bishops.
- ii) Churches belonging to religious communities.
- iii) Chapels for various foreign communities using various languages.
- iv) Eastern-Church parishes and communities throughout France dependent on the Archbishop as Ordinary of the Ordinariate of France, Faithful of Eastern Rites.

== Bishops of Paris ==
=== To 1000 ===
- ?–c. 250: Denis (died c. 250), believed to be the first bishop of Paris
- Mallon
- Masse
- Marcus
- Adventus
- c. 346: Victorinus
- c. 360: Paulus
- ?–417?: Prudentius
- 360–436: Marcellus of Paris
- ???–??: Vivianus (Vivien)
- ???–??: Felix
- ???–??: Flavianus
- ???–??: Ursicianus
- ???–??: Apedinus
- ???–??: Heraclius (511 – c. 525?)
- ???–??: Probatius
- 533–545: Amelius
- 545–552: Saffarace
- um 550: Eusebius I
- 550–576: Germanus
- 576–591: Ragnemod
- um 592: Eusebius II
- ???–??: Faramonde
- um 601: Simplicius
- 606–614: Ceraunus/Ceran
- Gendulf
- 625–626: Leudébert (Léodebert)
- ?-650: Audobertus
- 650–661: Landericus (Landry)
- 661–663: Chrodobertus
- ???–??: Sigebrand († 664)
- ???–666: Importunus
- 666–680: Agilbert
- 690–692: Sigefroi
- 693–698: Turnoald
- ???–??: Adulphe
- ???–??: Bernechaire († 722)
- 722–730: Hugh of Champagne
- ???–??: Agilbert
- ???–??: Merseidus
- ???–??: Fédole
- ???–??: Ragnecapt
- ???–??: Radbert
- ???–??: Madalbert (Maubert)
- 757-775: Déodefroi
- 775–795: Eschenradus
- ???–??: Ermanfroi (809?)
- 811–831: Inchad
- 831/2–857: Erchanrad II.
- 858–870: Aeneas
- 871–883: Ingelvin
- 884–886: Goslin
- 886–911: Anscharic (Chancellor 892, 894–896 and 900–910)
- 911–922: Theodulphe
- 922–926: Fulrad
- 927–c. 935: Adelhelme
- 937–941: Walter I., son of Raoul Tourte
- c. 954: Constantius
- 950–977: Albert of Flanders
- ???–??: Garin
- 979–980: Rainald I. (Renaud)
- 984–989: Lisiard († 19. April 989)
- 991–992: Gislebert (Engelbert) († 992)
- 991–1017: Renaud of Vendôme

=== 1000 to 1300 ===
- 1061–1095: Geoffroy de Boulogne
- 1096–1101: Guillaume de Montfort
- 1104–1116: Galo/Walo
- 1116–1123: Guibert
- c. 1123–1141: Stephen of Senlis
- c. 1143–1159: Theobald
- 1159–1160: Peter Lombard
- 1160–1196: Maurice de Sully
- 1196–1208: Odo de Sully
- 1208–1219: Pierre de La Chapelle (Peter of Nemours)
- 1220–1223: William of Seignelay, Guillaume de Seignelay (previously bishop of Auxerre)
- 1224–1227: Barthélmy
- 1228–1249: William of Auvergne
- 1249–1249: Walter de Château-Thierry (June to 23 September) (Gautier de Château-Thierry)
- 1250–1268: Renaud Mignon de Corbeil
- 1268–1279: Étienne Tempier
- 1280–1280: Jean de Allodio (23 March 1280)
- 1280–1288: Renaud de Hombliéres
- c. 1289: Adenolfus de Anagnia
- 1290–1304: Simon Matifas de Bucy (Matifardi)

=== 1300 to 1500 ===
- 1304–1319: Guillaume de Baufet
- 1319–1325: Étienne de Bouret
- 1325–1332: Hugues Michel de Besançon
- 1332–1342: Guillaume de Chanac (d. 1348)
- 1342–1349: Foulques de Chanac
- 1349–1350: Audoin-Aubert
- 1350–1352: Pierre de Lafôret
- 1353–1363: Jean de Meulan (also Bishop of Noyon)
- 1362–1368: Etienne de Poissy
- 1368–1383: Aymeric de Magnac
- 1383–1409: Pierre d'Orgemont, translated from bishop of Thérouanne
- 1409–1420: Gérard de Montaigu, translated from Poitiers (1409)
- 1420–1421: Jean Courtecuisse
- 1421–1422: Jean de La Rochetaillée, translated to Rouen (1422)
- 1423–1426: Jean IV de Nant, translated from Vienne (1423)
- 1427–1438: Jacques du Chastelier(Châtelier)
- 1439–1447: Denis du Moulin
- 1447–1472: Guillaume Chartier
- 1473–1492: Louis de Beaumont de la Forêt
- 1492?–1492/1493?: Gérard Gobaille
- 1492–1502: Jean-Simon de Champigny

=== From 1500 ===
- 1503–1519: Étienne de Poncher
- 1519–1532: François Poncher
- 1532–1541: Jean du Bellay
- 1551–1563: Eustache du Bellay
- 1564–1568: Guillaume Viole
- 1573–1598: Pierre de Gondi
- 1598–1622: Henri de Gondi

== Auxiliary bishops ==
- 1919–1926: Benjamin-Octave Roland-Gosselin
- 1922–1943: Emmanuel Chaptal
- 1954–1962: Jean Rupp
- 1968–1981: Daniel Pézeril
- 1977–1982: Émile Marcus, P.S.S.
- 1979–1980: Paul Poupard
- 1986–1997: Claude Frikart
- 1988–1999: André Vingt-Trois
- 1996–2000: Éric Aumonier
- 1997–2006: Pierre d'Ornellas
- 2006–: Jean-Yves Nahmias
- 2006– 2018: Jérôme Daniel Beau
- 2008–: Renauld de Dinechin
- 2008–2018: Éric de Moulins-Beaufort
- 2013–2014: Michel Aupetit
- 2016–2023: Thibault Verny
- 2016–2021: Denis Jachiet
- 2019–: Philippe Marsset

== See also ==
- Catholic Church in France
- List of Catholic dioceses in France
- List of religious buildings in Paris
- List of Roman Catholic archdioceses

== Bibliography ==
=== Reference works ===
- Gams, Pius Bonifatius (1873). Series episcoporum Ecclesiae catholicae: quotquot innotuerunt a beato Petro apostolo. Ratisbon: Typis et Sumptibus Georgii Josephi Manz. (Use with caution; obsolete)
- Eubel, Conradus, ed. (1913). Hierarchia catholica (in Latin). Vol. 1 (second ed.). Münster: Libreria Regensbergiana.
- Eubel, Conradus, ed. (1914). Hierarchia catholica (in Latin). Vol. 2 (second ed.). Münster: Libreria Regensbergiana.
- Eubel, Conradus; Gulik, Guilelmus, eds. (1923). Hierarchia catholica (in Latin). Vol. 3 (second ed.). Münster: Libreria Regensbergiana.
- Gauchat, Patritius (Patrice) (1935). Hierarchia catholica. Vol. IV (1592-1667). Münster: Libraria Regensbergiana.
- Ritzler, Remigius; Sefrin, Pirminus (1952). Hierarchia catholica medii et recentis aevi. Vol. V (1667-1730). Patavii: Messagero di S. Antonio.
- Ritzler, Remigius; Sefrin, Pirminus (1958). Hierarchia catholica medii et recentis aevi. Vol. VI (1730-1799). Patavii: Messagero di S. Antonio.
- Ritzler, Remigius; Sefrin, Pirminus (1968). Hierarchia Catholica medii et recentioris aevi (in Latin). Vol. VII (1800–1846). Monasterii: Libr. Regensburgiana.
- Remigius Ritzler; Pirminus Sefrin (1978). Hierarchia catholica Medii et recentioris aevi (in Latin). Vol. VIII (1846–1903). Il Messaggero di S. Antonio.
- Pięta, Zenon (2002). Hierarchia catholica medii et recentioris aevi... A pontificatu Pii PP. X (1903) usque ad pontificatum Benedictii PP. XV (1922) (in Latin). Vol. IX. Padua: Messagero di San Antonio. ISBN 978-88-250-1000-8.

=== Studies ===
- Andrieu, Jeanne-Marie Tuffery. Le concile national en 1797 et en 1801 à Paris: l'Abbé Grégoire et l'utopie d'une Eglise républicaine. (in French). Bern: Peter Lang, 2007.
- Duchesne, Louis (1910). Fastes épiscopaux de l'ancienne Gaule: II. L'Aquitaine et les Lyonnaises. Paris: Fontemoing.
- Du Tems, Hugues (1774). Le clergé de France, ou tableau historique et chronologique des archevêques, évêques, abbés, abbesses et chefs des chapitres principaux du royaume, depuis la fondation des églises jusqu'à nos jours (in French). Vol. Tome premier. Paris: Delalain.
- Fisquet, Honoré Jean P. (1864). La France pontificale ... histoire chronologique et biographique des archevêques et évêques de tous les diocèses de France. Paris (in French). Paris: E. Repos.
- Fisquet, Honoré Jean P. (1864). La France pontificale .... Paris. Doyens, Aumoniers, etc (in French). Vol. Tome second.
- Jean, Armand (1891). Les évêques et les archevêques de France depuis 1682 jusqu'à 1801 (in French). Paris: A. Picard. p. 78.
- Société bibliographique (France) (1907). L'épiscopat français depuis le Concordat jusqu'à la Séparation (1802-1905). Paris: Librairie des Saints-Pères.
