= Jordi d'Ornós =

Catalan prelate, diplomat and jurist

Jordi d'Ornós (Spanish: Jorge, Latin: Georgius, George; c. 1380 – 1452) was a Catalan prelate, diplomat and jurist. He served as bishop of Vic from 1424 until he stepped aside in 1445. He then served as bishop of Carpentras from 1449 until his death.

Born at Perpignan, Jordi began to study the liberal arts at the University of Perpignan around 1394 and ended his studies as a doctor of laws. He became the prior of the monastery of Sant Pere de Casserres and then archdeacon in the cathedrals of Elne and Barcelona.

On 5 March 1418 he was received by Pope Martin V at the Council of Constance, where he gave a speech congratulating the assembled churchmen on the restoration of unity. In 1423 Martin appointed him his representative to resolve the Great Schism in Catalonia. In 1429 he was present at the Council of Tortosa where the schism was resolved.

Jordi attended the Council of Basel in 1437, where the Antipope Felix V appointed him (anti-)cardinal-priest of the Basilica di Sant'Anastasia al Palatino, and afterwards of Santa Maria in Trastevere. The legitimate pope, Eugene IV, deposed Jordi from his see and his cardinalate, although he continued to exercise episcopal authority at Vic down to 1445.

In 1449 Jordi was reconciled with Pope Nicholas V, who appointed him bishop of Carpentras. He died there in 1452, bequeathing his library to the local cathedral.
