= Hélias de Saint-Yrieix =

French bishop

Hélias de Saint-Yrieix (died 1367) was a French Benedictine abbot, papal judiciary official, bishop and Cardinal.

== Life ==
Hélias was born at Saint-Yrieix-la-Perche, south of Limoges (Poitou). He had a nephew, John of S. Aredio (Yrieix). He was also a consanguineus of Bernard de Castris, papal marshal of the Romandiola.

Cardella states that he was a Doctor of Canon Law. He was abbot of Saint Maixent from c. 1329 to 1335. He was appointed abbot of the Abbey of Saint-Florent de Saumur, Saumur by Pope Benedict XII, on 13 June 1335. He held the position of Auditor literarum contradictarum in the papal chancery in Avignon.

=== Bishop ===
On 5 September 1344, he was appointed bishop of Uzès by Pope Innocent VI. In November 1351, he took part in a provincial council held by Pierre de la Jugié, Archbishop of Narbonne, in Beziers. On 1 September 1351, he and the bishop of Carpentras were appointed to investigate the claims of potential sainthood of Elzearius de Sabrano.

=== Cardinal ===
He was created cardinal priest of Stefano al Monte Celio by Pope Innocent VI in the consistory of 23 December 1356. Around 3 April 1363, Cardinal Hélias of S. Stefano was granted the Provostship of the cathedral of Mainz.

Shortly after 10 May 1363, he was promoted suburbicarian bishop of Ostia by Pope Urban V. In 1357, he was one of several cardinal-judges in the case of Richardus Armachanus, (Richard Fitz Ralph, Archbishop of Armagh). The pope also appointed him a judge in the lawsuit between the cathedral Chapter of Paris and the Chapter of the Collegiate Church of S. Benoît.

On, or shortly before, 4 March 1365, Bishop Hélias of Ostia resigned the benefice of Prior of the Benedictine church of Ispaniaco (diocese of Mende). On 28 February 1366, Pope Urban V (1362–1370) granted him the Provostship of Wydoy, near Limburg in the diocese of Liège.

Upon his death, 10 May 1367, he was buried in the cathedral of S. Marie de Domps in Avignon.

== Sources ==
- Baluze, Etienne, Vitae paparum avenionensium: hoc est Historia pontificum Romanorum qui in Gallia sederunt ab anno Christi MCCCV usque ad annum MCCCXCIV., (in Latin and French) Volume 2. new edition, ed. G. Mollat; Paris: Letouzey et Ané, 1928. pp. 447-448.
- Cardella, Lorenzo (1793). Memorie storiche de cardinali della Santa romana chiesa. (in Italian). Roma: Pagliarini, 1793. pp. 191-192.
- Eubel, Conradus, ed. (1913). Hierarchia catholica (in Latin). Vol. 1 (second ed.). Münster: Libreria Regensbergiana.
- Lecacheux, Paul (1902). Lettres secrètes et curiales du pape Urbain V (1362-1370) se rapportant à la France. (in Latin and French). Volume 1. Paris: A. Fontemoing 1902.

Catholic Church titles
Preceded by Andouin Aubert	Cardinal-bishop of Ostia; 1363–1367	Succeeded by Guillaume de la Sudrie
Preceded by Guillaume de Mandagout	bishop of Uzès; 1344–1346	Succeeded by Pierre d'Aigrefeuille
