= Guillaume Viole =

French Catholic Bishop of Paris (d. 1568)

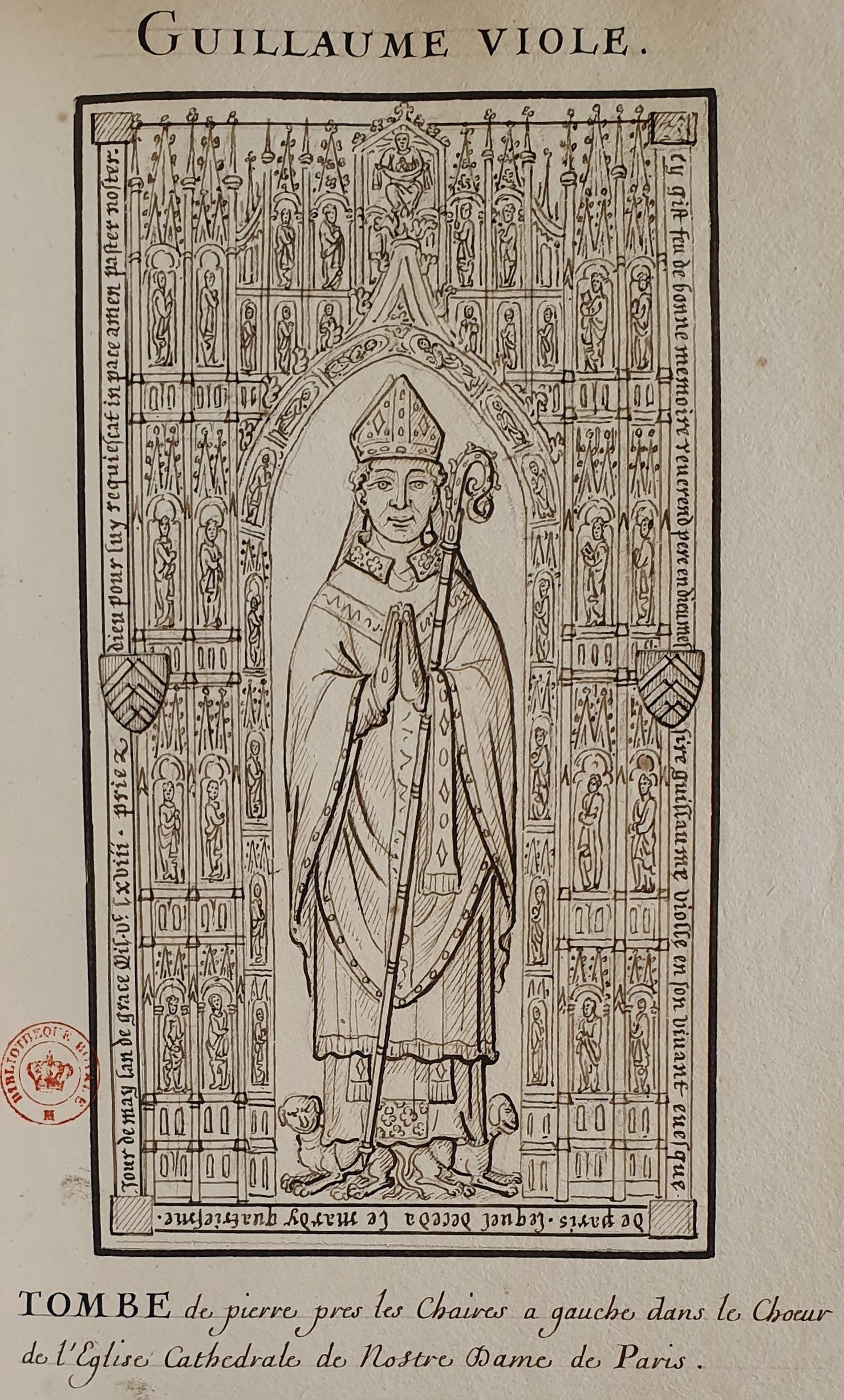
Tomb of Guillaume Viole drawn by Louis Boudan

Guillaume Viole (died 1568) was a French Catholic bishop. He was the Bishop of Paris from 1564 to 1568.

In 1564, Charles IX of France named Guillaume Viole Bishop of Paris to replace Eustache du Bellay who resigned in 1563. He was consecrated as a bishop on March 18, 1565. He died on May 4, 1568, and was buried in the choir of Notre-Dame de Paris.

Catholic Church titles
Preceded by Eustache du Bellay	Bishop of Paris; 1564–1568	Succeeded by Pierre de Gondi
