= Guillaume de la Sudrie =

French cardinal

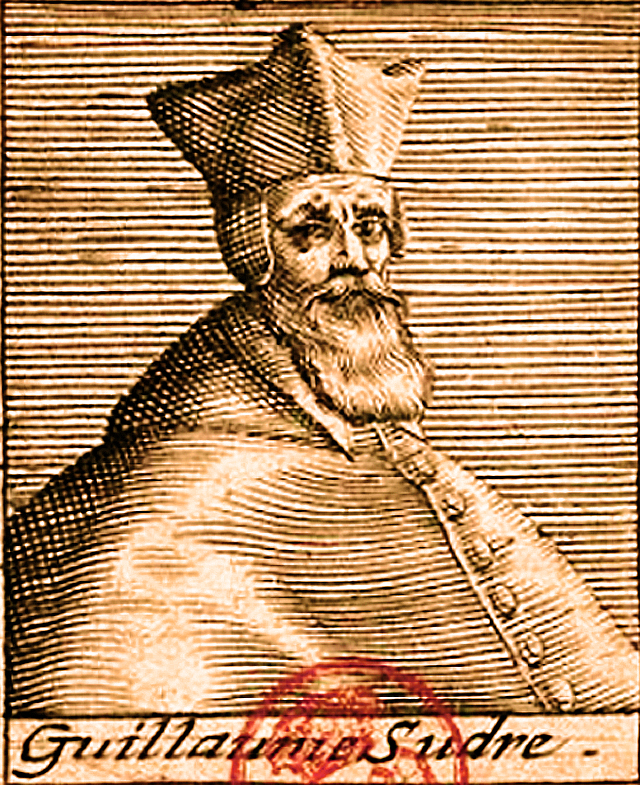
Guillaume Sudre

Guillaume de la Sudrie (la Sudré) (died 18 April 1373) was a French Dominican and Cardinal, born in Laguenne, Corrèze. He started to serve as bishop of Marseille in the beginning of 1361.

He was made cardinal on 18 September 1366 by Pope Urban V and was Bishop of Ostia from 1367 to 1373.

He died in Avignon and was buried in the monastery of Saint-Ruf, Valence.

Catholic Church titles
Preceded by Hélias de Saint-Yrieix	Cardinal-bishop of Ostia; 1367–1373	Succeeded by Pierre d'Estaing
Preceded by Pierre Fabri	Bishop of Marseille; 1361–1366	Succeeded by Philippe de Cabassoles
