= Diet of Frankfurt =

Diet of Frankfurt may refer any of the sessions of the Imperial Diet, Imperial States, or the prince-electors of the Holy Roman Empire which took place in the Imperial City of Frankfurt.

An incomplete lists of Diets of Frankfurt includes :

- Diet of Frankfurt (1147)
- Diet of Frankfurt (1196)
- Diet of Frankfurt (1310)
- Diet of Frankfurt (1338)
- Diet of Frankfurt (1379)
- Diet of Frnakfurt (1427)
- Diet of Frankfurt (1439), attended by the Spanish diplomat Domingo Ram y Lanaja
- Diet of Frankfurt (1446)
- Diet of Frankfurt (1556), attended by François Hotman
- Diet of Frankfurt (1790), attended by the Italian Cardinal Bartolomeo Pacca
