= Étienne de Bouret =

French Roman Catholic bishop

- Bishop of Paris
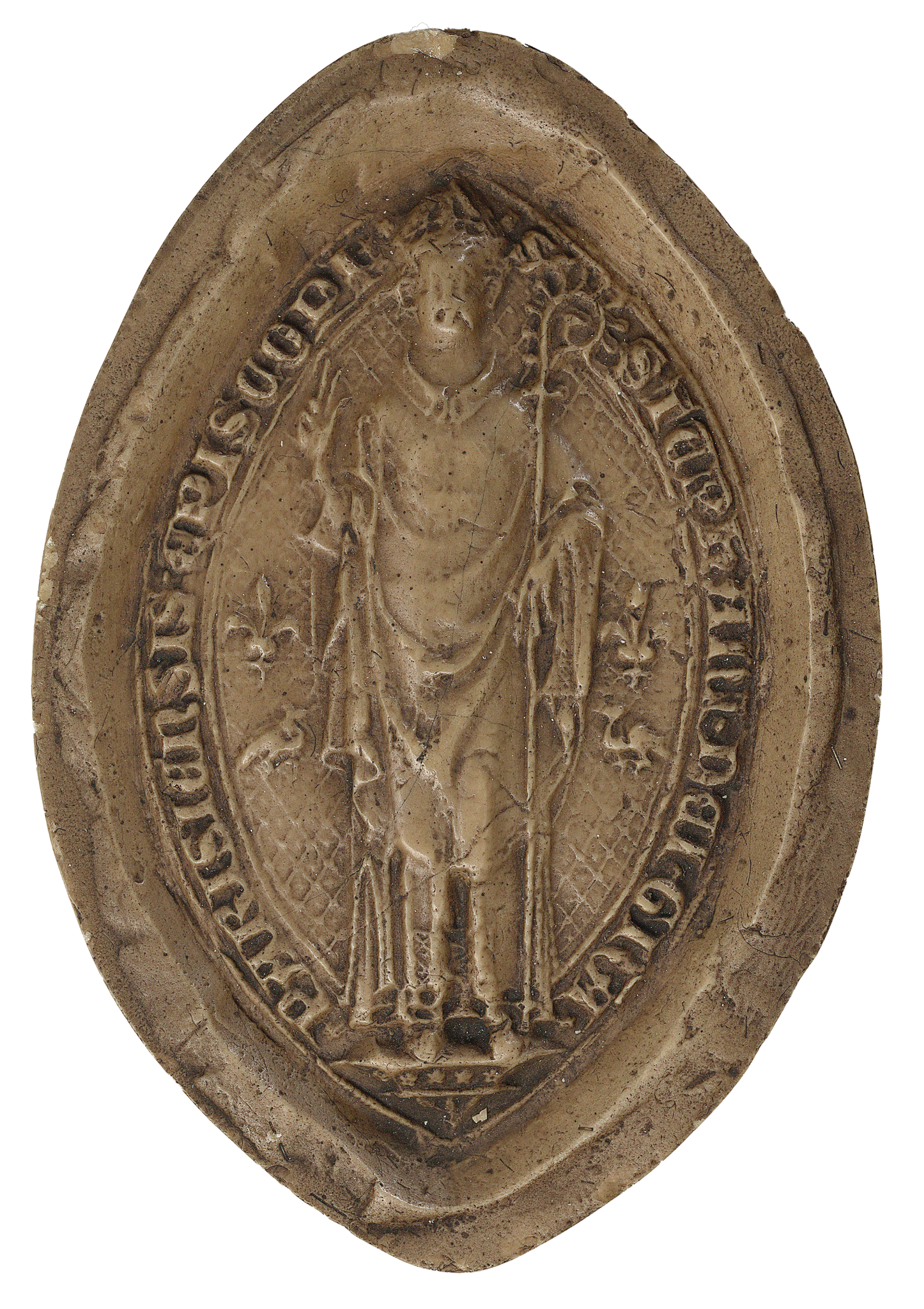
- Étienne's effigy
- In office: 1320 - 1325
- Predecessor: Guillaume de Baufet
- Successor: Hugues Michel de Besançon
- Other post: Dean of Chartres

Personal details
- Died: 1325

Étienne de Bouret (died 1325) was Bishop of Paris from 1320 until his death.

== Life ==
He was dean of Chartres, before being elected bishop of Paris in 1320.

In 1322 he arbitrated the divorce between Charles IV of France and Blanche of Burgundy following the Tour de Nesle affair. After collecting various testimonies he delegated the case to Rome, where John XXII annulled the marriage.

In 1325, Étienne assembeled various theologians and after deliberation repealed the condemnation of some of Thomas Aquinas' thesis that was performed by the previous bishops of Paris, namely Étienne Tempier.

He died in 1325 and was buried in the Abbey of Saint-Victor.

Catholic Church titles
Preceded by Guillaume de Baufet	Bishop of Paris; 1320 - 1325	Succeeded by Hugues Michel de Besançon
