= Simon Matifas de Bucy =

- Bishop of Paris
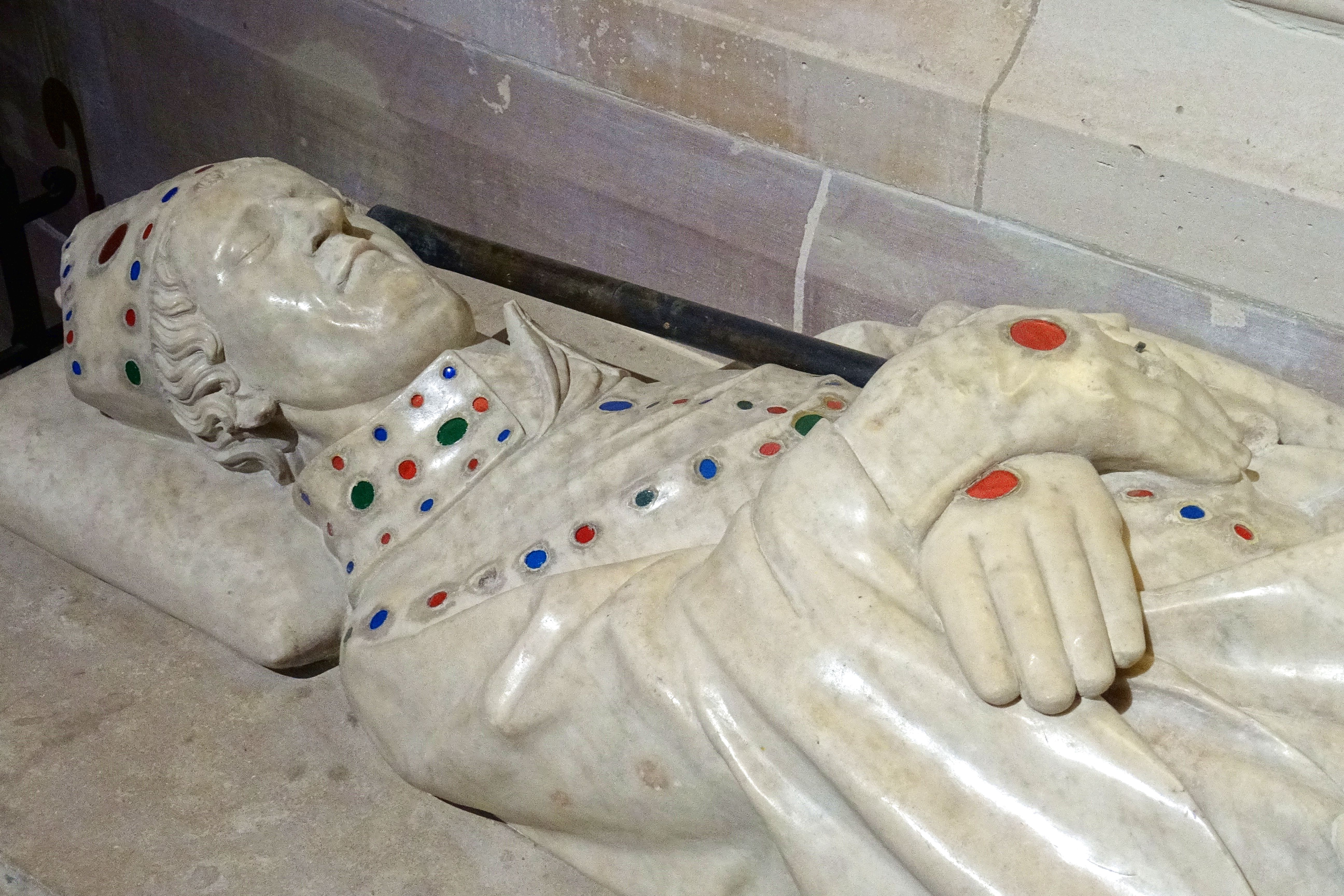
- Simon's effigy in the chapel of Notre-Dame-des-Sept-Douleurs.
- In office: 1290 - 1304
- Predecessor: Renaud de Hombliéres
- Successor: Guillaume de Baufet
- Other posts: Judge in the Exchequer of Normandy archdeacon of Reims canon in Paris, Laon and Soissons.

Personal details
- Died: 1304

Simon Matifas de Bucy (died 1304) was Bishop of Paris from 1290 until his death.

== Life ==
He was born in Bucy, in Soissons. Before being bishop, he was a judge in the Exchequer of Normandy and later archdeacon of Reims and canon in Paris, Laon and Soissons. However, after the death of Renaud de Hombliéres, the bishop of Paris, and the following demise of his elected successor, Adenulphe d'Agnani, before consecration, Simon Matifas was elected as bishop in 1290.

In 1290, Simon is said to have burned a Jew at the stake due to presumed host desecration. The host was reportedly burned but survived. The Church of Les Billettes was built on the site of the supposed miracle.

With his donations, Matifas financed the construction of three chapels in Notre-Dame de Paris. His tomb is located in that same cathedral.

Matifas died in 1304.

Catholic Church titles
Preceded by Renaud de Hombliéres	Bishop of Paris; 1290 - 1304	Succeeded by Guillaume de Baufet
