= Ragnemod =

Ragnemod (also known as Ragnemodus) was a 6th-century bishop of the archdiocese of Paris.

He is recorded briefly in Gregory of Tours' writings.

== Life ==
In Gregory's "Miracles of Martin", prior to becoming bishop of Paris, Ragnemod was afflicted with dysentery, and he was cured with dust from the tomb of Martin of Tours.

== Episcopate ==
He succeeded Germain of Paris as bishop upon the latter's death in 576.

According to Gregory, Merovech, the son of King Chilperic I was forced to become a monk by his father after he had tried to marry his aunt. However, Merovech escaped and fled to Tours where he took refuge in the church of Saint Martin. Ragnemod was present at the time with Gregory, who was bishop of Tours, and Merovech asked them to give him communion, but they refused. Merovech threatened to kill some of their people if he was not given communion, and Gregory then decided to give him communion to avoid bloodshed.

Ragnemod was one of the bishops present at the church synod that judged and condemned Prætextatus, bishop of Rouen, in 577.

According to Gregory, some killings occurred within the church of Saint Denis in Paris as a result of a dispute about a woman who was alleged to be adulteress. As a result of this, the church was placed under interdict. Those who shed blood in the church went to Bishop Ragnemod and made atonement for their conduct, and he received them back into communion.

Ragnemod baptized Chilperic's son Theuderic during the Easter celebration of 583 or 584.

Gregory recounted a story of an imposter who claimed to possess Vincent of Saragossa and one of the martyr saints named Felix. This imposter first went to Tours before he went to Paris. During the days leading up to the feast of the ascension, this imposter joined Bishop Ragnemod's procession through the city. The bishop discovered the imposter and had him locked up for questioning. He found a number of items in his possession that he believed to be used in sorcery and had them cast into the river. Ragnemod then ordered the man to be driven out of Paris.

Ragnemod was nicknamed 'Rucco' by Venantius Fortunatus.

He died in Paris in the year 591.
