= Hugues Michel de Besançon =

- Bishop of Paris
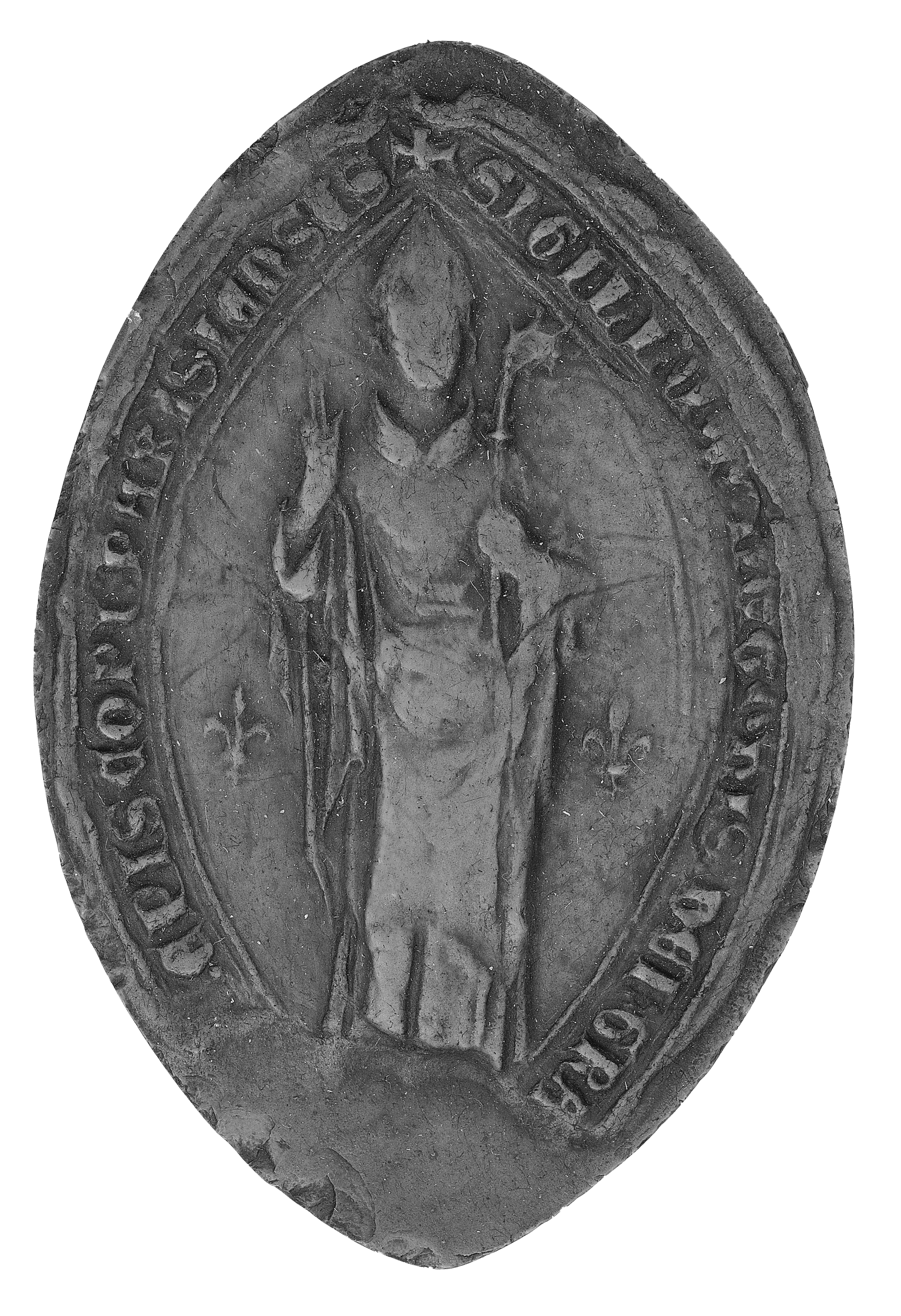
- Hugues' sigil
- In office: 1326 - 1332
- Predecessor: Étienne de Bouret
- Successor: Guillaume de Chanac
- Other posts: Doctor of law Canon and cantor of Paris

Personal details
- Died: 1332

Hugues Michel de Besançon (died 1332) was Bishop of Paris from 1326 until his death.

== Life ==
He was born in Besançon. He was a doctor of law and canon and cantor of Paris before being elected bishop in 1326.

In 1326 Hugues and Guillaume de Laudun, Archbishop of Vienne, issued a pardon for the Flemish

In 1329 he supported John XXII in his opposition to Michael of Cesena and his views.

In 1330 he came into conflict with the University of Paris. This is because Hugues fined a student for rape and the university objected that the bishop didn't have the right to meddle with university affairs, as he had sworn not to do so, thus making him a perjurer. John XXII favoured the bishop in the dispute and annulled the oath, while decreeing that the fined money be distributed to poor students.

He died the 29th of July 1332.

Catholic Church titles
Preceded by Étienne de Bouret	Bishop of Paris; 1326 - 1332	Succeeded by Guillaume de Chanac
