= Pseudocardinal =

Uncanonical Cardinals appointed by antipopes

A pseudocardinal (also quasi-cardinal or anticardinal) is a cardinal created by an antipope, that is, one whose appointed is not recognized as canonical by the Catholic Church.

== Status ==
Their state, like the state of the antipopes and the anti-bishops these appointed/created, is disputed. Many pseudocardinals were created during the controversy between the Holy See and the Holy Roman Empire during the Western Schism, and some of the cardinals switched their obedience. The legitimacy of the popes of the different obediences during the Western Schism was not a clear matter for their contemporaries. The terms antipope, pseudocardinal and anticardinal were not used at that time, but they are now used by some modern Roman Catholic historians.

== Creations by antipopes ==
The following antipopes created pseudo-cardinals (with status and age at time of creation in parentheses when available) :

=== Anacletus II ===
Antipope Anacletus II (1130–1138) - 3 consistories, 8 pseudocardinals

1. Consistory of 1130.03.29
  1. Germano, Cardinal-Deacon
  2. Gregorio Otone, Cardinal-Deacon
  3. Pietro, O.S.B. Cas., Cardinal-Deacon
2. Consistory of 1131
  1. Donato, Cardinal-Priest
  2. Anselmo, Cardinal-Priest
  3. Rainaldo, Cardinal-Deacon
  4. Matteo, Cardinal-Deacon
3. Consistory of 1135.03.31 : only Benedetto, O.S.B. Cas., Cardinal-Priest

=== Nicholas V ===
Antipope Nicholas V (1328–1330) - 4 consistories, 9 pseudocardinals

1. Consistory of 1328.05.15
  1. Giacomo Alberti, Bishop emeritus of Castello, Cardinal-Bishop
  2. Franz Hermann, Cardinal-Bishop
  3. Bonifazio Donoratico, O.P., Bishop of Chersonissos, Cardinal-Bishop
  4. Nicola Fabriani, O.E.S.A., Cardinal-Priest
  5. Pietro Oringa, Cardinal-Priest
  6. Giovanni Arlotti, Cardinal-Deacon
2. Consistory of 1328.09
  1. Paolo da Viterbo, O.F.M., Cardinal-Deacon
3. Consistory of 1329.01.19
  1. Giovanni Visconti (38), Cardinal-Deacon
4. Consistory of 1329
  1. Pandolfo Capocci, Cardinal-Deacon

=== Western Schism ===
==== Clement VII ====
Antipope Clement VII (1378–1394) - 12 consistories, 33 pseudocardinals

1. Consistory of 1378.12.18 (6)
  1. Giacomo da Itri, Patriarch of Constantinople and Metropolitan Archbishop of Otranto (Italy), Cardinal-Priest
  2. Niccolò Brancaccio (38), Metropolitan Archbishop of Cosenza (Italy), Cardinal-Priest
  3. Pierre Amiel de Sarcenas, O.S.B. Clun. (69), Metropolitan Archbishop of Embrun (France), Cardinal-Priest
  4. Pierre-Raymond de Barrière, C.R.S.A., Bishop of Autun (France), Cardinal-Priest
  5. Nicolas de Saint Saturnin, O.P., Master of the Sacred Palace of Prefecture of the Holy Apostolic Palaces, Cardinal-Priest
  6. Leonardo Rossi da Giffoni, O.F.M., Minister General emeritus of Order of Friars Minor (Franciscans), Cardinal-Priest
2. Consistory of 1381.03.19 : only Gautier Gómez de Luna, Bishop of Palencia (Spain)
3. Consistory of 1382.05.30 : only Tommaso Clausse, O.P., Cardinal-Priest
4. Consistory of 1383.12.23 :
  1. Pierre de Cros, O.S.B. Clun., Metropolitan Archbishop of Arles (France) and Chamberlain of the Holy Roman Church of Reverend Apostolic Camera, Cardinal-Priest
  2. Faydit d’Aigrefeuille, O.S.B. Clun., Bishop of Avignon (France), Cardinal-Priest
  3. Aymeric de Magnac, Bishop of Paris (France), Cardinal-Priest
  4. Jacques de Menthonay, Cardinal-Priest
  5. Amedeo di Saluzzo (22), Bishop of Valence (France), Cardinal-Deacon
  6. Pierre Aycelin de Montaigut, O.S.B. Clun. (63), Bishop of Laon (France), Cardinal-Priest
  7. Walter Wardlaw (66), Bishop of Glasgow (Scotland), Cardinal-Priest
  8. Jean de Neufchatel (43), Bishop of Toul (France), Cardinal-Priest
  9. Pierre de Fetigny, Cardinal-Deacon
5. Consistory of 1384.04.15 : only Pierre de Luxembourg (14), Bishop of Metz (France), Cardinal-Deacon
6. Consistory of 1385.07.12 :
  1. Bertrand de Chanac, Patriarch of Jerusalem and Apostolic Administrator of Le Puy-en-Velay (France), Cardinal-Priest
  2. Tommaso Ammannati, Metropolitan Archbishop of Napoli (Italy), Cardinal-Priest
  3. Giovanni Piacentini, Metropolitan Archbishop emeritus of Patrasso and Apostolic Administrator emeritus of Castello, Cardinal-Priest
  4. Amaury de Lautrec, Bishop of Saint-Bertrand-de-Comminges (France), Cardinal-Priest
  5. Jean de Murol (45), Bishop of Genève (Switzerland), Cardinal-Priest
  6. Jean Rolland, Bishop of Amiens (France), Cardinal-Priest
  7. Jean Allarmet de Brogny (43), Bishop of Viviers (France), Cardinal-Priest
  8. Pierre de Thury, Bishop of Maillezais, Cardinal-Priest
7. Consistory of 1387.01 : only Jerónimo de Aragón (45), Bishop of Valencia (Spain), Cardinal-Priest
8. Consistory of 1389.11.03 : only Jean de Talaru, Metropolitan Archbishop of Lyon (France), Cardinal-Priest
9. Consistory of 1390.07.21 : only Martín de Zalba (53), Bishop of Pamplona (Spain), Cardinal-Priest
10. Consistory of 1390.10.17 (2)
  1. Jean Flandrin (89), Metropolitan Archbishop of Auch (France), Cardinal-Priest
  2. Pierre Girard, Bishop of Le Puy-en-Velay (France), Cardinal-Priest
11. Consistory of 1391.04.17 : only Guillaume de Vergy (41), Metropolitan Archbishop of Besançon (France), Cardinal-Priest
12. Consistory of 1394.01.23 : only Pedro Fernández de Frías, Bishop of Osma (Spain), Cardinal-Priest

==== Benedict XIII ====
Antipope Benedict XIII (1394–1423) - 7 consistories, 19 pseudocardinals

1. Consistory of 1395.12.24 : only Pierre Blain, Cardinal-Deacon
2. Consistory of 1397.09.22
  1. Fernando Pérez Calvillo, Bishop of Tarazona (Spain), Cardinal-Priest
  2. Jofré de Boil, Cardinal-Deacon
  3. Pedro Serra, Bishop of Catania (Italy), Cardinal-Priest
3. Consistory of 1397.12.21
  1. Berenguer de Anglesola, Bishop of Gerona (Spain), Cardinal-Priest
  2. Bonifacio Ammannati, Cardinal-Deacon
  3. Louis de Bar (27), Bishop-elect of Langres (France), Cardinal-Deacon
4. Consistory of 1404.05.09
  1. Miguel de Zalba (30), Cardinal-Deacon
  2. Antoine de Challant (54), Cardinal-Deacon
5. Consistory of 1408.09.22
  1. Pierre Ravat, Canons Regular of Saint Augustine (C.R.S.A.), Bishop of Saint-Pons-de-Thomières (France), Cardinal-Priest
  2. Jean d’Armagnac (58), Metropolitan Archbishop emeritus of Auch (France), Cardinal-Priest
  3. Friar Juan Martínez de Murillo, Cistercian Order (O. Cist.), Cardinal-Priest
  4. Carlos Jordán de Urriés y Pérez Salanova, Cardinal-Deacon
  5. Alfonso Carrillo de Albornoz, Cardinal-Deacon
6. Consistory of 1412.12.14 : only Pedro Fonseca, Cardinal-Deacon
7. Consistory of 1423.05.22
  1. Julián Lobera y Valtierra, Cardinal-Priest
  2. Ximeno Dahe, Cardinal-Priest
  3. Domingo de Bonnefoi, Carthusians (O. Cart.), Cardinal-Priest
  4. Bishop Jean Carrier, Cardinal-Priest

==== John XXIII ====
Antipope John XXIII (1410–1415) - 4 consistories, 18 pseudocardinals

1. Consistory of 1411.06.06
  1. Francesco Lando, Latin Patriarch of Constantinople and Latin Patriarch emeritus of Grado (Italy), Cardinal-Priest
  2. Antonio Panciera (61), Latin Patriarch of Aquileia (Italy), Cardinal-Priest
  3. Alemanno Adimari (49), Metropolitan Archbishop of Pisa (Italy), Cardinal-Priest
  4. João Afonso Esteves da Azambuja (71), Metropolitan Archbishop of Lisboa (Portugal), Cardinal-Priest
  5. Pierre d'Ailly (61), Bishop of Cambrai (France), Cardinal-Priest
  6. Georg von Liechtenstein-Nicolsburg (51), Bishop of Trento (Italy), declined his uncanonical promotion
  7. Tommaso Brancaccio, Bishop of Tricarico (Italy), Cardinal-Priest
  8. Branda Castiglione (61), Bishop emeritus of Piacenza (Italy), Cardinal-Priest
  9. Archbishop Thomas Langley (48), Bishop of Durham (England), Cardinal-Priest
  10. Archbishop Robert Hallam, Bishop of Salisbury (England), Cardinal-Priest
  11. Gilles Deschamps (61), Bishop of Coutances (France), Cardinal-Priest
  12. Guglielmo Carbone, Bishop of Chieti (Italy), Cardinal-Priest
  13. Father Guillaume Fillastre (63), Cardinal-Priest
  14. Msgr. Lucido Conti, Cardinal-Deacon
  15. Francesco Zabarella (50), Bishop of Firenze (Italy), Cardinal-Deacon
2. Consistory of 1413.04.13 : only Simon of Cramaud (68), Latin Patriarch of Alexandria, Metropolitan Archbishop of Reims (France) and Apostolic Administrator of Avignon (France), Cardinal-Priest
3. Consistory of 1413.11.18 : only Giacomo Isolani (53), Cardinal-Deacon
4. Consistory of 1414.09 : only Pierre de Foix, O.F.M. (28), Bishop of Lescar (France), Cardinal-Priest

==== Clement VIII ====
Antipope Clement VIII (1423–1429) - 1 consistories, 2 pseudocardinals

1. Consistory of 26 July 1429
  1. Francesc Rovira i Escuder
  2. Gil Sánchez Muñoz

==== Felix V ====
Antipope Felix V (1439–1449) - 5 consistories, 25 pseudocardinals

1. Consistory of 1440.04.12
  1. Louis de La Palud, O.S.B., bishop of Lausanne
  2. Bartolomeo Visconti, bishop of Novara.
  3. Walram von Moers, bishop elect of Utrecht, Netherlands
  4. Alfonso Carrillo de Acuña, administrator of the see of Sigüenza
2. Consistory of 1440.10.02
  1. Aleksander Mazowiecki, prince-bishop of Trent
  2. Ot de Montcada i de Luna, bishop of Tortosa
  3. Jordi d'Ornós, bishop of Vich, Spain
  4. François de Meez, O.S.B., bishop of Geneva
  5. Bernard de La Planche, O.S.B., bishop of Dax
  6. John of Ragusa, O.P., bishop of Ardjisch, Walachia
  7. Johann Grünwalder, vicar general of Freising
  8. John of Segovia, archdeacon of Villaviciosa, Oviedo
3. Consistory of 1440.11.12
  1. Amédée de Talaru, archbishop of Lyon
  2. Denis du Moulin, bishop of Paris
  3. Philippe de Coetquis, archbishop of Tours
  4. Niccolò Tedeschi, O.S.B., archbishop of Palermo
  5. Gérard Machet, bishop of Castres
  6. Jean de Malestroit, bishop of Nantes, France.
4. Consistory of 1444.04.06
  1. Jean d'Arces, archbishop of Tarentaise
  2. Luís Gonçalves do Amaral, bishop of Viseu
  3. Wincenty Kot z Dębna, archbishop of Gniezno and primate of Poland
  4. Guillaume-Hugues d'Estaing, O.S.B., archdeacon of Metz
  5. Bartolomeo Vitelleschi, bishop of Corneto e Montefiascone
  6. Thomas de Courcelles, canon of the cathedral chapter of Amiens
5. Consistory of 1447.08.01
  1. Lancelot de Lusignan, patriarch of Jerusalem.

== Sources and external links ==
- GCatholic - Creations of (pseudo)cardinals by (Anti-)Pope
  - under Anacletus II (Rome)
  - under Benedict XIII (Avignon)
  - under Clement VII (Avignon)
  - under John XXIII (Pisa)
  - under Nicholas V (Rome)
- Catalog of Pseudocardinals (1058-1447)
