= Ceraunus =

7th-century Bishop of Paris and Catholic saint

Ceraunus (Céran) was the Bishop of Paris from 606 to about 614.

== Life ==
Ceraunus was bishop of Paris. He established a school at the monastery of Saint-Vincent - on the site of the later monastery of Saint-Germain-des-Prés.

In 614 he took part in the Council of Paris, which was held in the Apostolic Church of Saintes-Pierre-et-Paul - on the site of the later monastery of Sainte-Geneviève and today's Lycée Henri-IV -and was attended by 78 Frankish bishops. From these bishops he collected and compiled the Acts of the Martyrs. A copy of the acts of Speusippus, Eleusippus and Melapsippus was sent from Langres by one Varnahair, to Ceraunus.

Ceraunus was buried in the crypt of the then Church of the Apostles next to Genoveva of Paris. In 1253 his relics were placed there on an altar in the upper church.

He is a Catholic and Orthodox saint, his feast day is 27 September.

There is a statue of Saint Céran by Louis Desprez in Eglise Saint-Germain l'Auxerrois in Paris.
