= Château de Grizac =

- France/Languedoc-Roussillon/Lozère
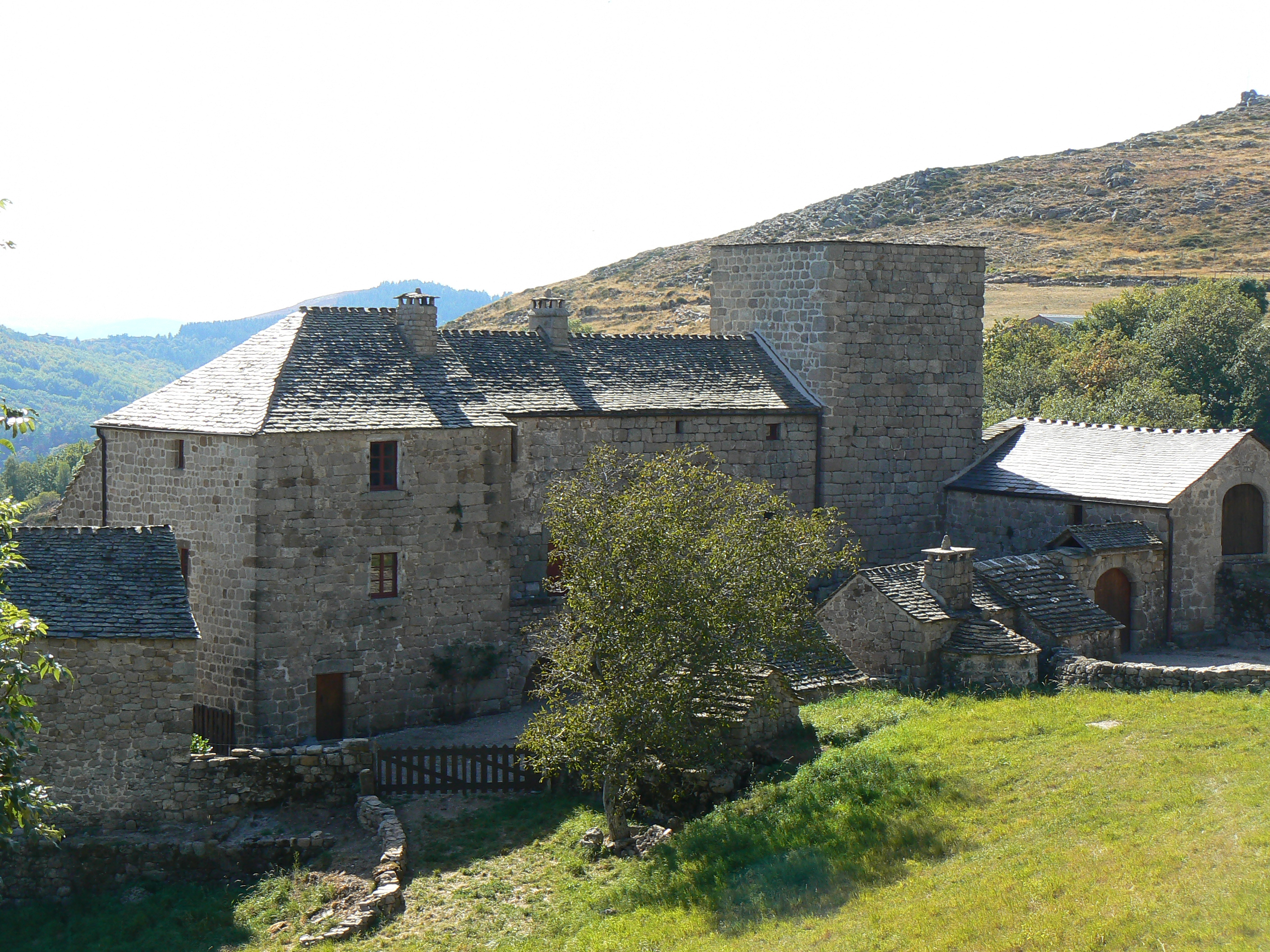
- Overview

Site information
- Owner: Renaud de Laubespin

Location
- Coordinates: 44.3422°N 3.6975°E

Site history
- Built by: a Seigneur de Grizac

Grizac Castle (Château de Grizac) is located below the village of the same name, in Le Pont-de-Montvert commune of Lozère department, in the region of Occitanie, France. It was built in the middle of the 13th century and enlarged in the 14th century. Pope Urban V was born in the château in 1310 with the name Guillaume de Grimoard. Now private property, paid entry provides access to the grounds and buildings which includes an exhibition on Pope Urban V.
