= Foulques de Chanac =

- Bishop of Paris
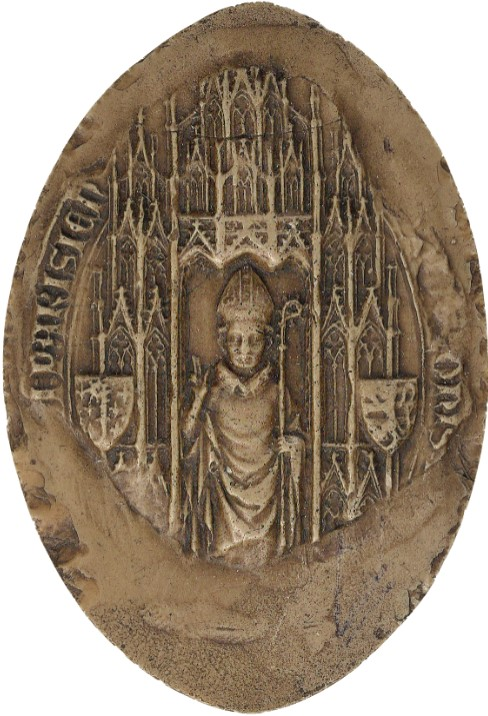
- Foulques' sigil
- In office: 1342 - 1349
- Predecessor: Guillaume de Chanac
- Successor: Andouin Aubert

Personal details
- Died: 1349

Foulques de Chanac (died 25 July 1349) was Bishop of Paris from 28 November 1342 until his death.

The previous bishop was Guillaume de Chanac, uncle of Foulques de Chanac. When Guillaume left the bishopric to become Latin Patriarch of Alexandria he arranged for his nephew Foulques to take over as bishop. Likewise, Foulques then offered patronage to his nephew, also called Guillaume de Chanac, later a Cardinal. Another nephew was Foulques de Chanac II, Bishop of Orléans.

Bishop Foulques de Chanac died of the Black Death on 25 July 1349.

Catholic Church titles
Preceded by Guillaume de Chanac	Bishop of Paris; 1342–1349	Succeeded by Andouin Aubert
