= Stephen of Senlis =

Bishop of Paris

Stephen of Senlis (died 6 May 1142) was archdeacon of Notre-Dame de Paris. He was elected bishop of Paris in 1123 and held the bishopric until his death. He was father of Guy, lord of Chantilly, descendant of the counts of Senlis, holders of the office of Grand Butler of France.

== Sources ==
- Histoire littéraire de la France, Par Antoine Rivet de la Grange, François Clément, Charles Clémencet, Pierre Claude François Daunou, Joseph Victor Le Clerc, Barthélemy Hauréau...
- Google Livres : Barthélemy Hauréau, Paul Meyer - Histoire littéraire de la France, Volume 12 - Firmin Didot - 1830
