= Eustache du Bellay =

French Catholic bishop

Eustache du Bellay (died 4 September 1565) was Bishop of Paris from 1551 to 1563.

== Biography ==
Eustache du Bellay was the nephew of Jean du Bellay, who was Bishop of Paris from 1532 to 1541. In 1551, Henry II of France selected Eustache du Bellay as the new Bishop of Paris. He was consecrated as a bishop on 15 November 1551. He attended the Council of Trent and opposed the introduction of the Society of Jesus into his diocese. He resigned his bishopric in 1563. He died at Bellay in Anjou on 4 September 1565.

== Bibliography ==
- This page is based on this page on French Wikipedia.

Catholic Church titles
Preceded by Jean du Bellay	Bishop of Paris; 1551–1563	Succeeded by Guillaume Viole
