= Andouin Aubert =

French jurist, bishop and Cardinal

Cardinal Audouin Aubert
- Cardinal-Bishop
- Church: SS. Giovanni e Paolo (1353-1361)
- Diocese: Paris (1349-1350); Auxerre (1350-1353); Maguelonne (1353); Ostia (1361-1363)

Orders
- Consecration: 12 September 1349
- Created cardinal: 15 February 1353 by Pope Innocent VI

Personal details
- Born: Diocese of Limoges
- Died: 10 May 1363 Avignon, France
- Buried: Chartreuse of Villeneuve
- Parents: Guy Aubert; Marguerite de Livron
- Education: Doctor in Canon and Civil Law

Audouin Aubert (Aldouin Alberti, or Andouin) (died 1363) was a French jurist, bishop and Cardinal.

He was the son of Guy Aubert, a brother of Pope Innocent VI (Étienne Aubert, a Limousin) (1352-1362). His mother was Marguerite de Livron. His father had been ennobled by King Philip VI in March 1338. He had a brother named Gauthier, who predeceased him, and a sister Agnes, who was married to Ademar de Rebyeira. He had a niece named Gualiana, and another named Raymunda de Rossinhac. He had a nephew, Guy Aubert. He was baptized in the church in the village of Beyssac, near Brives in the diocese of Limoges.

He was Doctor in utroque iure (Civil Law and Canon Law). It is not known where he studied, but, given his interest in Toulouse in his Testament, that University must be considered a likely candidate. Pope Benedict XII (1334-1342) granted him a Canonicate in the Collegiate Church of Sainte-Radegonde in Poitiers.

On 21 May 1342, Audouin was named Provost of Saint-Pierre d'Aire, and in 1344 he became Canon and Prebendary of Cambrai. He was also Prebendary at Limoges, and also Prebendary and then Dean of the Collegiate Church of Saint-Irieix in Limoges. He was rector of the parish church of Pluma (Plume) in the diocese of Condom; of Tilly (Thil) and Sainte-Foi (Sainte-Foy-de-Peyrolières), in the diocese of Toulouse. Andouin became an Apostolic Subdeacon, Apostolic Notary, and was appointed Archdeacon of Brabant at the end of 1348, with the privilege of visiting his Archdeaconry by proxy; and Canon and Prebend in the Church of Liége (1348-1349). He was also Archdeacon of Lincoln in England. He was made bishop of Paris by Pope Clement VI on 11 September 1349. On 31 March 1351, the Bishop's former Vicar-General, Jean de Lyons, created three scholarships in the Collège de Saint-Nicholas du Louvre on the Bishop's behalf.

In the next year, on 20 December 1350, Audouin was appointed bishop of Auxerre, to fill the seat vacated by the new Cardinal Pierre de Cros.

On 30 January 1353 Andouin Aubert was named bishop of Maguelonne by Pope Innocent VI. Three and a half months later he resigned as bishop, and took up residence in Avignon; his successor was appointed on 15 May.

He was the first and only cardinal created by his Uncle, Innocent VI, in the Consistory of 15 February 1353. He was named cardinal priest of Ss. Giovanni e Paolo on Monte Celio in Rome. He succeeded his uncle, who had become pope.

Aubert was promoted to the suburbicarian See of Ostia by his uncle, Pope Innocent, in 1361, following the death of Cardinal Petrus Bertrandi on 13 July 1361. From 1361 to 1363 he held a Prebend and was Archdeacon of Dunois in the Church of Chartres.

In 1362 Cardinal Aubert, as Bishop of Ostia, had the right and privilege of consecrating Guillaume Grimoard, the new Pope Urban V, a bishop.

The Cardinal drew up his Last Will and Testament in Avignon on 3 and 5 May 1363. Later in the day he added a codicil, granting money to the cardinals who would be Executors of his Will, and to the Notaries. He had obtained the privilege of making a Will, from his Uncle, the Pope, on 15 May 1353.

He died in Avignon on 10 May 1363. He was buried, along with his uncle, in the Chartreuse at Villeneuve-les-Avignon, which Pope Innocent had founded.

In his Testament, Cardinal Andouin Aubert founded the residential Collège de Maguelone in the city of Toulouse, for the benefit of ten poor scholars and a priest to care for them. He made the college his universal heir (residual legatee). Cardinal Jean de Blauzac, his executor, obtained letters from King Charles VI of France to finance the college, and Pope Gregory XI granted him the necessary powers to draw up the Statutes for the college. The College was to be for students in grammar, logic, and the other liberal arts. He left a silver chalice and a gilded paten to each of his benefices. He wrote his own epitaph:

Lapide sub hoc modico iacent omnia viscera Ostiensis
Audoini dum vivebam in vita mea.

== Bibliography ==
- Baluze [Baluzius], Etienne [Stephanus] (1693). Vitae paparum Avenionensium, hoc est, Historia pontificum romanorum qui in Gallia sederunt ab anno Christi MCCCV. usque ad annum MCCCXCIV (in Latin). Vol. Tomus primus. Paris: apud Franciscum Muguet.
- Baluze, Etienne (1693). Vitae Paparum Avenionensium, Hoc est Historia Pontificum Romanorum qui in Gallia sederunt ab anno Christi MCCCV usque ad annum MCCCXCIV (in Latin). Vol. Tomus secundus. Paris: Muguet.
- Bliss, William Henry; Johnson, C. (1897). Calendar of Entries in the Papal Registers Relating to Great Britain and Ireland: 1342-1362. Vol. III. London: H.M. Stationery Office.
- Du Chesne, François (1660). Histoire De Tous Les Cardinaux François De Naissance: (in French). Vol. Tome I. Paris: Aux despens de l' Autheur. pp. 465–470.
- Du Chesne, François (1660). Preuves de l' Histoire de tous les cardinaux François de naissance (in French and Latin). Paris: Aux despens de l'Autheur & se vendent chez luy. pp. 311–322.
- Eubel, Konrad (1898). Hierarchia catholica medii aevi: sive Summorum pontificum, S.R.E. cardinalium, ecclesiarum antistitum series ab anno 1198 usque ad annum [1605] perducta e documentis tabularii praesertim Vaticani collecta, digesta (in Latin). Vol. I. Münster: sumptibus et typis librariae Regensbergianae. (second edition 1913).
- Fisquet, H. (1864). La France pontificale (Gallia Christiana): Paris, et histoire du Notre-Dame (in French). Vol. Tome premier. Paris: Etienne Repos.
- Pélissier, Antoine (1961). Innocent VI: le Réformateur; deuxième pape limousin (1352-1362) (in French). F. Layotte.
- Renouard, Yves (1970). The Avignon papacy, 1305-1403. Hamden CT USA: Archon Books. ISBN 978-0-208-01156-5.
- Rollo-Koster, Joëlle (2015). Avignon and Its Papacy, 1309–1417: Popes, Institutions, and Society. New York-London: Rowman & Littlefield Publishers. ISBN 978-1-4422-1534-4.

Catholic Church titles
Preceded by Pierre Bertrand du Colombier	Cardinal-bishop of Ostia; 1361–1363	Succeeded by Elie de Saint Yrieux
Preceded by Pierre de Cros	Bishop of Auxerre; 1351–1352	Succeeded by Jean d’Auxois
Preceded by Arnaud de Verdale	Bishop of Maguelonne; 1352–1353	Succeeded by Durand de Chapelles
Preceded by Foulques de Chanac	Bishop of Paris; 1349–1350	Succeeded by Pierre de Lafôret
