= Guillaume de Chanac =

French Benedictine and Cardinal

- Church: Roman Catholic
- Diocese: Chartres; Mende
- Elected: September 22, 1368

Orders
- Created cardinal: May 30, 1371

Personal details
- Died: December 30, 1383
- Parents: Guy de Chanac and Isabelle de Montroux

Guillaume de Chanac (died December 30, 1383) was a French Benedictine who became a Cardinal.

He was abbot at Bèze Abbey, and then was abbot at Saint-Florent from 1354 to 1368. He was Bishop of Chartres and then Bishop of Mende, for brief periods up to 1371.

He supported the Collège de Chanac Pompadour in Paris, named after his great-uncle of the same name.

== Biography ==
He was born in Paris on an unknown date, but most certainly in the early 1320s. The son of Guy de Chanac, a knight from Limousin originally from Allassac, and Isabeau, known as Belotte de Montbron, he was the grandnephew of Guillaume V de Chanac, Bishop of Paris (1333–1342) and Latin Patriarch of Alexandria (1342–1348), and the nephew of Foulques de Chanac, Bishop of Paris (1342–1349). One of his nephews, Bertrand de Chanac, would become a cardinal from 1385 to 1401.
