= Claude Frikart =

French prelate

Claude Henri Edouard Frikart, C.I.M
- Titular Bishop of Summula
- Church: Roman Catholic Church
- See: Titular See of Summula
- In office: 1986 - 2014
- Predecessor: none
- Successor: current
- Previous post(s): Prelate

Orders
- Ordination: 2 July 1948

Personal details
- Born: 5 March 1922; Ermont, France
- Died: 18 December 2014 (aged 92)

Claude Henri Édouard Frikart (5 March 1922 – 18 December 2014) was a French Prelate of Roman Catholic Church, and member of the Congregation of Jesus and Mary (Eudists, C.I.M.). He was also author of L'Eglise: 15 questions sur son histoire (2003) answering difficult questions.

Frikart was born in Ermont, France and ordained a priest on 2 July 1948 from the religious order of Congregation of Jesus and Mary. Frikart was appointed auxiliary archbishop to the Paris Archdiocese on 21 June 1986 as well as the titular bishop of Summula and ordained bishop on 2 September 1961. Frikart retired on 2 September 1997 as auxiliary archbishop.
