= Etienne de Poissy =

French cardinal, archbishop and Chancellor

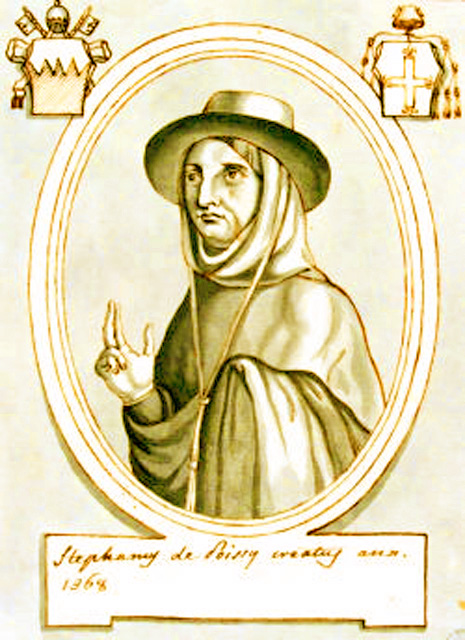
Etienne de Poissy

Etienne de Poissy (died 17 October 1373) was a cardinal of the Catholic Church. He was archbishop of Paris, France, and French Chancellor.

He was made cardinal on 22 September 1368 by Pope Urban V.

He attended the baptism of future King Charles VI of France.
