= Council of Tortosa =

The Council of Tortosa (officially Concilium Dertusanum) was an unrecognised Ecumenical Council held in Catalonia in 1429, convoked by Cardinal Pierre de Foix. The council convened between 19 September and 5 November, passing various decrees concerning the divine service, the ornaments of the church, instruction of youth, the qualifications of the holders of benefices, etc.

Attendees included all the prelates and many of the ecclesiastics of the Kingdom of Aragon, the Kingdom of Valencia, and of the Principality of Catalonia. The king's letters confirming the liberties and immunities of the church were read, and at the end of the fourth session twenty canons were approved and published.

== Purposes of the Council ==
Antipope Clement VIII, who was only recognised by the Aragonese, renounced the insignia of the papacy on 26 July 1429. His cession was confirmed by the Council, effectively bringing an end to the Great Schism.

The Inquisition had hardly touched the Crown of Aragon and the Crown of Castile in 1429, and the council entreated that "for divine mercy's sake, the king of Aragon, the barons, knights, prelates, and universities, should protect the Jews from violence, from which they would otherwise have suffered" (under the Inquisition). The council succeeded in as much that about thirty years elapsed without an insurrection against the Jews. It was not until 1498 that the Spanish Inquisition effectively swept away the protection that Spain's Jews enjoyed following the Council.

== Canons ==
In all, 20 canon were published by the Council, including:

- 4. Orders that all beneficed clerks and ecclesiastics in holy orders shall keep breviaries in order that they may say the office privately when hindered from attending the choir.
- 5. Forbids the elevation of unworthy persons to holy orders.
- 6. Orders curates every Sunday to teach by catechising some part of the things necessary to be known by Christians in order to receive salvation, which it declared to be:

i. What they ought to believe, contained in the articles of faith.
ii. What they ought to pray for, contained in the Lord's Prayer.
iii. What they ought to keep, contained in the ten commandments.
iv. What they ought to avoid, that is the seven mortal sins.
v. What they ought to desire, that is the joys of paradise.
vi. What they ought to fear, that is the pains of hell.

- 9. Orders neophytes to bring their children to church within eight days after their birth in order that they may receive baptism.
- 15. Forbids the delegate of the Holy See to go beyond their commission.

=== Published agreements with Canon of previous councils ===
In addition, the Council:

- Restricted the use of furs to dignitaries and cathedral canons.
- Ordered that physicians should not pay more than two visits to any person who had not confessed. under penalty of their own excommunication.
- Banned payments by the bishops to all priests for keeping women.
