= Angel de Grimoard =

French Roman Catholic Cardinal (c. 1315/1320 - 1388)

His Eminence Angel de Grimoard C.R.S.A
- Cardinal-Bishop of Albano
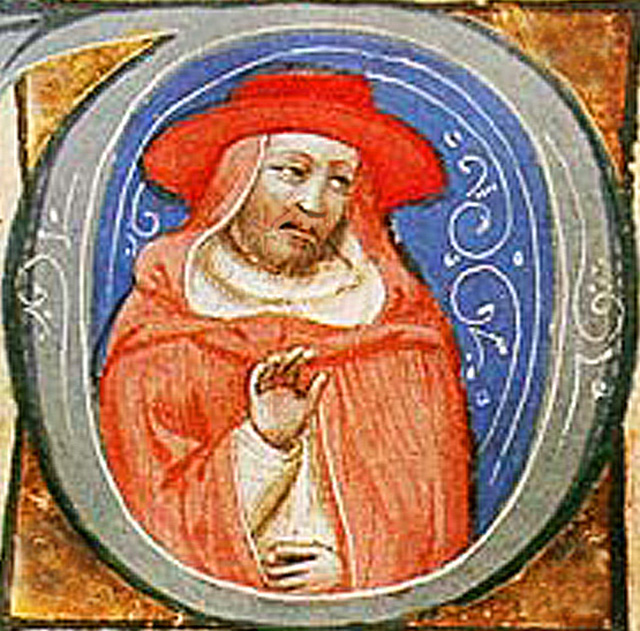
- Miniature of Cardinal Grimoard, 14th century
- Church: Catholic Church
- Appointed: 17 September 1367
- Term ended: 13 April 1388
- Predecessor: Pierre Itier
- Successor: Niccolò Brancaccio
- Previous posts: Bishop of Avignon (1362–1366); Cardinal-Priest of San Pietro in Vincoli (1366–1367); Dean of the College of Cardinals (1373–1378)

Orders
- Created cardinal: 18 September 1366 by Pope Urban V
- Rank: Cardinal-Bishop

Personal details
- Born: Angelique de Grimoard de Grisac; 1315 Languedoc, France
- Died: 13 April 1388 (aged 72–73) Avignon, France
- Coat of arms

Angel de Grimoard (ca. 1315/1320 in Grizac, Languedoc – 13 April 1388 in Avignon), also recorded as Angelic or Anglic, was a French canon regular and a Cardinal. He was the younger brother of Pope Urban V.

== Biogrophy ==
He was born about 1315 in the Castle of Grizac, now located in the commune of Le Pont-de-Montvert, the son of William de Grimoard, Lord of Bellegarde, and of Amphélise de Montferrand. As a young man, he joined the Canons Regular of Saint Augustine at the Abbey of Saint Rufus near Valence. In 1358 he became prior of the Priory of St.-Pierre-de-Dieu. In September 1362 his older brother, the Benedictine Abbot Guillaume, was elected pope. His brother named him Bishop of Avignon that following December.

Four years later, in a consistory held at Avignon on 18 September 1366, Grimoard was created Cardinal Priest, with the title of San Pietro in Vincoli, long held by canons regular. In September 1367 he was promoted to the rank of Cardinal-Bishop of Albano. He was Papal Vicar for the administration of the Papal States from 1368 until 1371. In this office, he tried to conquer the city of Forlì, which was a Ghibelline town, but was never able to do so.

At the end of 1370, the dying Pope Urban, who had returned to Avignon after a brief stay in Rome, asked to be moved to Anglic's residence, that he might be closer to the people he loved. He died there on 19 December.

After the ensuing conclave held in Avignon to choose the new pope, Grimoard was named archpriest of the Lateran Basilica, succeeding Cardinal Pierre Roger de Beaufort, who had been elected Pope Gregory XI. He became Dean of the Sacred College in November 1373. He chose not to return to Rome with Gregory, who returned the residence of the papacy to Rome in 1376.

After the outbreak of the Great Western Schism in 1378 he gave his allegiance to the Antipope Clement VII, in consequence of which he lost his position as Dean of the collegiate chapter of York. Cardinal Grimoard was never able to participate in either of the conclaves held during his cardinalate as he was serving in Italy when his brother died, and was in Avignon for the following one, which was held in Rome.

He authored several liturgical music compositions during his lifetime, and was the founder of several monasteries in Apt, Avignon and Montpellier. After his death on 13 April 1388, he was buried in the Abbey of Saint Rufus, his original monastery, as he had directed.
