= Pope Urban V =

Head of the Catholic Church from 1362 to 1370

Pope Blessed Urban V
- Bishop of Rome
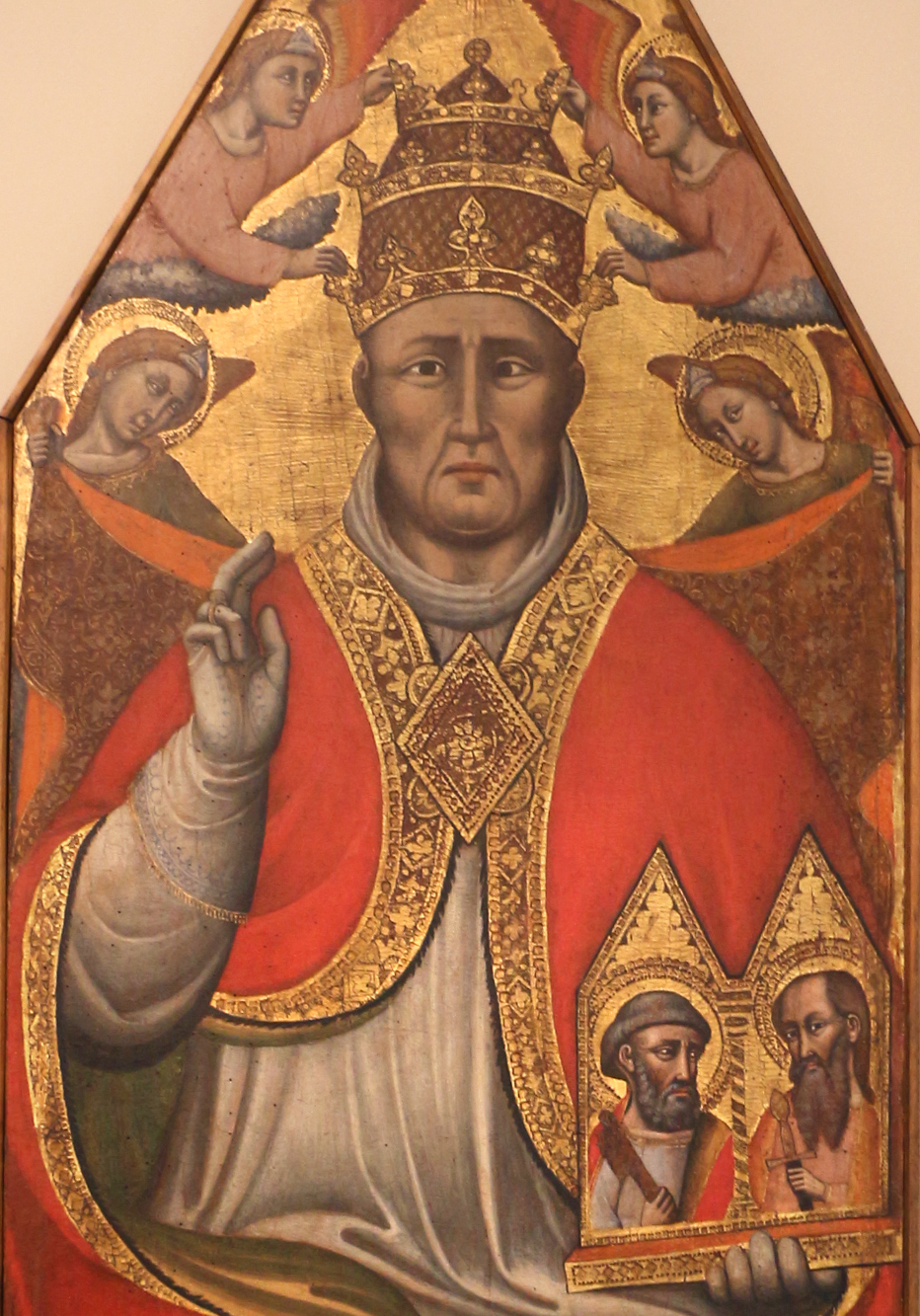
- Portrait by Simone dei Crocifissi, c. 1375
- Church: Catholic Church
- Papacy began: 28 September 1362
- Papacy ended: 19 December 1370
- Predecessor: Innocent VI
- Successor: Gregory XI
- Previous posts: Abbot of the Abbey of Saint Victor (1361–1362); Abbot Ordinary of Monte Cassino (1366–1369); Administrator of Avignon (1366–1367)

Orders
- Ordination: 1334
- Consecration: 6 November 1362 by Andouin Aubert

Personal details
- Born: Guillaume de Grimoard; 1310 Grizac Castle, France
- Died: 19 December 1370 (aged 59–60) Avignon, Papal States
- Coat of arms: Urban V's coat of arms

Sainthood
- Feast day: 19 December
- Venerated in: Catholic Church
- Beatified: 10 March 1870 by Pius IX
- Attributes: Papal vestments; Papal tiara
- Patronage: Architects; Educators; Benedictines; Missionaries

Papal styles of Pope Urban V
- Reference style: His Holiness
- Spoken style: Your Holiness
- Religious style: Holy Father
- Posthumous style: None

Pope Urban V (Latin: Urbanus V; born Guillaume de Grimoard, 1310 – 19 December 1370) was head of the Catholic Church from 28 September 1362 until his death on 19 December 1370. He was a member of the Order of Saint Benedict and the only Avignon pope to be beatified.

Even after his election as pontiff, he continued to follow the Benedictine Rule, living simply and modestly. This frequently brought him into conflict with his ecclesial peers, who were often accustomed to affluent lifestyles.

Urban V pressed for reform throughout his pontificate and also oversaw the restoration and construction of churches and monasteries. One of the goals he set himself upon his election to the Papacy was the reunion of the Eastern and Western Churches. He came as close as some of his predecessors and successors, but did not succeed.

== Early life ==
Guillaume de Grimoard was born in 1310 at the castle of Grizac, near Mende, in what is now the department of Lozère. He was the oldest son of Guillaume de Grimoard, lord of Grizac, and Amphélise de Montferrand. He had six siblings, including his younger brother Angel de Grimoard, whom Guillaume, as Pope Urban V, created cardinal in 1366.

Grimoard was tonsured at the age of twelve and left home to study at the University of Montpellier, later continuing his education in civil law at the University of Toulouse. In 1327, he joined the small priory of Chirac to become a Benedictine monk. Grimoard was then sent to the Abbey of St. Victor in Marseille for his novitiate. After his profession of monastic vows, he was ordained a priest at Chirac in 1334. He studied literature and law at Montpellier, and then he moved to the University of Toulouse, where he studied law for four years. He earned a doctorate in Canon Law on 31 October 1342. He became a noted canonist, teaching at Montpellier, Paris and Avignon.

He was appointed Prior of Nôtre-Dame du Pré (de Priorato) in the diocese of Auxerre by Pope Clement VI, which he held until his promotion to Saint-Germain en Auxerre in 1352. He began both disciplinary and financial reforms. His new bishop, Jean d'Auxois (1353–1359), however, in concert with the Archbishop of Sens, Guillaume de Melun, made heavy demands on the hospitality of the monks of Saint-Germain in Auxerre, and when the bishops attempted to impose new exactions, which were resisted by Grimoard, the Archbishop physically abused the Prior. Grimoard nonetheless would not submit. Prior Grimoard became Procurator-General for the Order of St. Benedict at the Papal Curia.

The Bishop of Clermont, Pierre de Aigrefeuille (1349–1357), appointed Grimoard to be his vicar general, which meant in effect that he ruled the diocese on behalf of the bishop. When Bishop Pierre was transferred to Uzès (1357–1366), Guillaume Grimond became Vicar General of Uzès.

Guillaume was named abbot of the monastery of Saint-Germain en Auxerre on 13 February 1352 by Pope Clement VI. In 1359 the town and abbey were captured by the English and subjected to heavy imposts.

== Italian missions ==
=== First mission ===
In the summer of 1352 Pope Clement VI summoned Abbot Guillaume for an assignment. Northern Italy had been in a chaotic state for some time, due to the ambitions of the Visconti of Milan, led by Archbishop Giovanni Visconti. He had conquered much of Lombardy, seized the Papal city of Bologna, and was invading the borders of Florentine territory. In order to keep a hold on the territory for the Catholic Church, the Pope had hit on the scheme of making Archbishop Visconti his vicar of Bologna for the present. He drew up an agreement on 27 April 1352, which absolved the Visconti of all their transgressions and signed away much of northern Italy. The Pope even made the first payment on the subsidy which he was going to provide them. The Visconti, on their part, had no intention of observing the terms of the pact, one of which was the return of the Legation of Bologna to the Papacy, despite the fine words and promises they made in Avignon. On 26 July, Abbot Grimoard and Msgr. Azzo Manzi da Reggio, the Dean of the Cathedral of Aquileia, were presented with written instructions by Pope Clement to go to northern Italy as apostolic nuncios to deal with the situation. Guillaume was to receive the city of Bologna from the Visconti, who were illegal occupiers, and hand it over to Giovanni Visconti as the papal vicar, and to threaten with ecclesiastical censures any parties who did not adhere to the treaty. This he did on 2 October 1352. Guillaume was allotted 8 gold florins a day for his expenses, his associate Anzo only 4 florins. While he was in Milan he was also able to get the Archbishop to renew the treaty that was expiring with the King and Queen of Sicily.

=== Second mission ===
In 1354 Abbot Grimoard was sent to Italy again, this time to Rome, where there was business that needed to be transacted for the Apostolic Camera. There were also serious disorders in the Basilica of St. Peter which needed to be sorted out.

In August 1361, he was elected the abbot of the Abbey of Saint-Victor in Marseille. Despite the appointment, he continued to teach as a professor, at least for the next academic year.

=== Third mission ===
Cardinal Gil Álvarez Carrillo de Albornoz had been sent to Italy in 1353, to bring under control the notorious Giovanni di Vico of Viterbo, as well as the Malatesta of Rimini and the Ordelaffi family of Forlì. In 1360 Abbot Guillaume was sent to assist him by dealing with Archbishop Visconti's nephew and successor, Bernabò Visconti. Their confrontation was so hostile and threatening that the Abbot left immediately and reported back to Pope Innocent the treachery of his vassal. The Pope sent him back to Italy immediately, but happily the utter defeat of Visconti's army which was besieging Bologna by Cardinal Albornoz eased the situation considerably. Nonetheless, immediately after he was elected pope, Grimoard excommunicated Bernabò Visconti. He returned to France, and retired to his castle of Auriol, where he was found on 10 June 1362.

The reason for his retirement to Auriol is not far to seek. The plague was raging in southern France again in 1361 and 1362. Cardinal Pierre des Près died on 16 May 1361; Cardinal Petrus de Foresta, died on 7 June 1361; Cardinal Guillaume Farinier, died on 17 June 1361; Cardinal Guillaume Court, O.Cist., died on 12 June 1361; Cardinal Petrus Bertrandi, died on 13 July 1361; Cardinal Jean de Caraman, died on 1 August 1361; Cardinal Bernard de la Tour, died on 7 August 1361; Cardinal Francesco degli Atti, died on 25 August 1361; and Cardinal Pierre de Cros died in September 1361. In addition it was estimated that some 6000 persons and more than 100 bishops died in 1361. Cardinal Nicolas Roselli (1357–1362) of Tarragona died at Majorca on 28 March 1362, though not of the plague.

=== Naples ===
King Louis I of Naples died on 25 May 1362. This set off a power struggle, with Queen Joanna I attempting to get back the power she had lost to her husband, as well as a contest to see who her next husband would be. Abbot Guillaume was summoned to Avignon, where he was on 27 June, and sent to Naples to provide the advice and guidance as to the desires of the feudal overlord of Naples, Pope Innocent VI.

During his trip to the south, he visited the great Benedictine abbey of Monte Cassino, where he was saddened to see the state into which it had fallen, both physically and organizationally, both from earthquakes and episcopal neglect. As soon as he became Pope he undertook to repair the situation, and on 31 March 1367 he abolished the diocese of Cassino and restored the monastery to the complete control of its Abbot.

== Papacy ==
In September 1362, Grimoard was apostolic nuncio in Italy when Pope Innocent VI died. Exactly where he was when the news reached him summoning him to Avignon is unknown. Naples is just a guess; other possibilities are Florence and Lombardy.

Pope Innocent VI died on 12 September 1362. The Conclave to elect his successor opened on 22 September, the Feast of Saint Maurice, in the Apostolic Palace in Avignon. Twenty of the twenty-one cardinals were in attendance. Only Cardinal Albornoz remained at his post in Italy. Of the twenty cardinals eighteen were French in origin, six of them Limousin. Ten of the twenty-one cardinals were papal relatives. The influence of the Limousin cardinals was somewhat diminished since their homeland had recently become subject to English occupation, which frightened the thirteen cardinals who were subjects of the King of France. Both Cardinals Hélie de Talleyrand and Guy de Boulogne considered themselves to be electable.

Matteo Villani, the Florentine chronicler, says that fifteen cardinals were prepared to elect, or actually elected, Hugues Roger, OSB, a Limousin and the brother of Pope Clement VI, who was Chamberlain of the College of Cardinals. Cardinal Hugues declined the offer. Villani is the only source that reports this version of events. This story, moreover, contradicts the report of Jean de Froissart, who claims that a stalemate developed between Talleyrand and Guy de Boulogne, such that members of neither party could get the required two-thirds of the votes. It was apparently one of the Limousin Cardinals, Guillaume d'Aigrefeuille, who directed the attention of the cardinals to Abbot Guillaume Grimoard. On 28 September, they elected Grimoard as the new Pope. He was not initially informed of the result; instead, he was requested to return immediately to Avignon to "consult" with the Conclave. The cardinals feared the reaction of the Romans to the election of another French pope, and so kept the results of the election secret until Grimoard's arrival a month later, at the end of October. The Romans had been clamoring for some time for a Roman, or at least Italian, pope, and it was feared they would interfere with Guillaume's travel had they known of his election. Upon his arrival, Grimoard accepted his election and took the pontifical name of Urban V. When asked the reason for the selection of his new name, Grimoard was alleged to have said: "All the popes who have borne this name were saints".

Grimoard was not even a bishop at the time of his election, and had to be consecrated before he could be crowned. This was done on 6 November by Cardinal Andouin Aubert, the Bishop of Ostia, a nephew of Grimoard's predecessor, Innocent VI. The Bishop of Ostia had the traditional right to consecrate a pope as a bishop. At the conclusion of the consecration Mass, Urban V was crowned. There is no record of who it was who placed the crown on his head. The right to do so belonged to the cardinal protodeacon, who was Cardinal Guillaume de la Jugié, a nephew of Pope Clement VI. Urban V was the sixth pope in the Avignon Papacy.

Urban V kept on another papal nephew, Arnaud Aubert, the nephew of Pope Innocent VI. He had been given the very important position of papal chamberlain, the head of the church's financial department, by his uncle in 1361. He continued in that office throughout the reign of Urban V and also that of Gregory XI, until 1371. In addition to the management of the papal household, the office made Aubert the temporal vicar for the Pope in the diocese of Avignon and the administrator of the Comtat-Venaissin.

In 1363–1364 the winter was so cold, especially in January, February and March, that the Rhone froze over to the extent that people and vehicles could travel across the ice. The Pope, however, announced that he would excommunicate anyone who attempted to do so, fearing that people might accidentally fall in and be drowned. Near Carcassonne, a man froze to death while travelling on his horse, though the horse was able to make it back to its accustomed stable with the dead man on its back. Many of the poor, women, and children died of the cold.

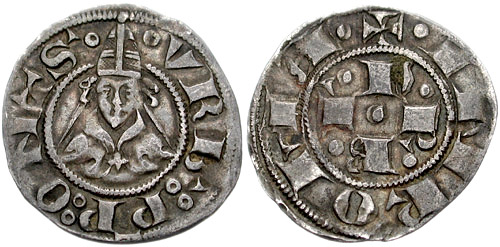
A bolognino of Urban V

=== Reformer and patron of education ===
As pope, Urban V continued to follow the discipline of the Benedictine Rule and to wear his monastic habit. Urban V worked against absenteeism, pluralism and simony, while seeking to improve clerical training and examination. It must be kept in mind, however, that, with the training of a monk, reform was a matter of return to ideal values and principles through discipline, not a matter of striking out with new solutions. With the training of a lawyer, reform was a matter of codifying and enforcing established decisions and precedents.

Pope Urban V introduced considerable reforms in the administration of justice and liberally patronized learning. He founded a university in Hungary. He granted the University of Pavia the status of Studium Generale (14 April 1363). In Toulouse, he granted the Theology Faculty the same rights as possessed by the University of Paris. In Montpellier, he restored the school of medicine and founded the College of Saint Benedict, whose church, decorated with numerous works of art, later became the cathedral of the city. He founded a collegiate church in Quézac, and a church and library in Ispagnac. On a hilltop near Bédouès, the parish in which the Château de Grisac is situated, he built a church where the bodies of his parents were buried, and, we are informed by a papal bull of December 1363, he instituted a college of six canon-priests, along with a deacon and a subdeacon.

Urban V issued a preliminary consent for the establishment of the university of Kraków, which by September 1364 had gained full papal consent. He provided books and the best professors to more than 1,000 students of all classes. Around Rome, he also planted vineyards.

He imposed the penalty of excommunication on anyone who molested the Jews or attempted forcible conversion and baptism.

=== Military campaigns ===
The great feature of Urban V's reign was the effort to return the papacy to Rome and to suppress its powerful rivals for the temporal sovereignty there. He began by sending his brother, Cardinal Angelicus Grimoard, as legate in northern Italy. In 1362 Urban ordered a crusade to be preached throughout Italy against Bernabò Visconti, Giangaleazzo Visconti and their kindred, accused as robbers of the church's estate. In March 1363 Bernabò was declared a heretic. However, Pope Urban found it necessary to purchase peace in March of the following year, sending the newly created Cardinal Androin de la Roche, former Abbot of Cluny, as apostolic legate to Italy to arrange the business. Then, through the mediation of Emperor Charles IV, Urban lifted his excommunication against Bernabò, obtaining Bologna only after he signed a hasty peace that was highly favorable to Bernabò.

In May 1365 the Emperor Charles visited Avignon, where he appeared with the Pope in full imperial regalia. He then proceeded to Arles, which was one of his domains, where he was crowned King by the Archbishop, Pierre de Cros, OSB.

Urban V's greatest desire was that of a crusade against the Turks. In 1363, King John II of France and Peter I, the King of Cyprus, came to Avignon, and it was decided that there should be a war against the Turks. It was Urban and Peter who were most eager for the crusade; the French were exhausted by recent losses in the Hundred Years' War, and some of their leaders were still being held prisoner in England. The Pope held a special ceremony on Holy Saturday, 1363, and bestowed the crusader's cross on the two kings, and on Cardinal Hélie de Talleyrand as well. John II was appointed Rector and Captain General of the expedition. Cardinal de Talleyrand was appointed apostolic legate for the expedition, but he died on 17 January 1364, before the expedition could set out. Assembling the army proved an impossible task, and King John returned to prison in England. He died in London on 8 April 1364.

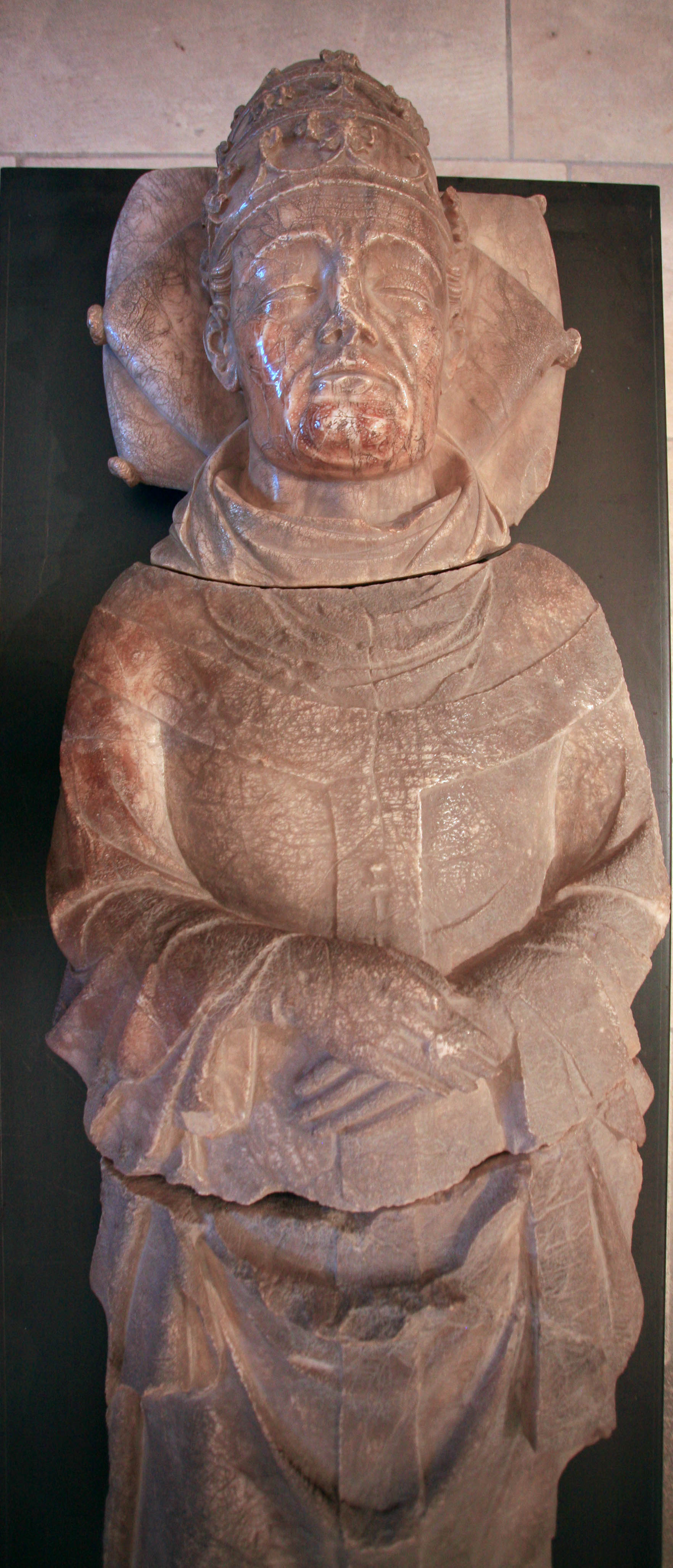
Urban V, Abbey of St. Victor, Marseille

King Peter of Cyprus, disappointed by King John's return to captivity in England and the death of Cardinal de Talleyrand, collected whatever soldiers he could, and in 1365 launched a successful attack on Alexandria (11 October 1365). Additional support was not forthcoming, however, and seeing that the enemy vastly outnumbered the crusaders, he ordered the sacking and burning of the city, and then withdrew. He continued to harass the coasts of Syria and Egypt until he was assassinated in 1369. Urban, however, played no part in the crusade or its aftermath.

Amadeus of Savoy and Louis of Hungary also put together a crusade in Urban's reign in 1366. Initially they were successful, and Amadeus even captured Gallipoli. But despite initial successes, each was forced to withdraw.

=== To Rome and back ===
Continued troubles in Italy, as well as pleas from figures such as Petrarch and Bridget of Sweden, caused Urban V to set out for Rome, only to find that his Vicar, Cardinal Albornoz, had just died. He conducted the remains of the Cardinal to Assisi, where they were buried in the Basilica of Saint Francis. The Pope reached the City of Rome on 16 October 1367, the first pope in sixty years to set foot in his own diocese. He was greeted by the clergy and people with joy, and despite the satisfaction of being attended by the Emperor Charles IV in St. Peter's, and of placing the crown upon the head of the Empress Elizabeth (1 November 1368), it soon became clear that by changing the seat of his government he had not increased its power. In Rome he was nonetheless able to receive the homage of King Peter I of Cyprus, Queen Joan I of Naples, and the confession of faith by the Byzantine Emperor John V Palaeologus. Bridget of Sweden, who was living in Rome and attempting to get approval for a new religious order, the Bridgettines, had actually appeared before the Pope at Montefiascone in 1370 as he was preparing to return to France, and, in the presence of Cardinal Pierre Roger de Beaufort, the future pope, predicted the death of the Pope if he should leave Rome.

Unable any longer to resist the urgency of the French cardinals, and despite several cities of the Papal States still being in revolt, Urban V boarded a ship at Corneto heading for France on 5 September 1370, arriving back at Avignon on the 27th of the same month. A few days later he fell severely ill. Feeling his death approaching, he asked that he might be moved from the Papal Palace to the nearby residence of his brother, Angel de Grimoard, whom he had made a cardinal, that he might be close to those he loved. He died there on 19 December 1370. He had been pope for eight years, one month, and nineteen days. His body was initially placed in the Chapel of John XXII in the Cathedral of S. Marie de Domps in Avignon. On 31 May 1371 his remains were transferred to the monastery of Saint-Victor in Marseille, where he had built a splendid tomb for himself.

== Beatification ==
Blessed Urban V O.S.B.
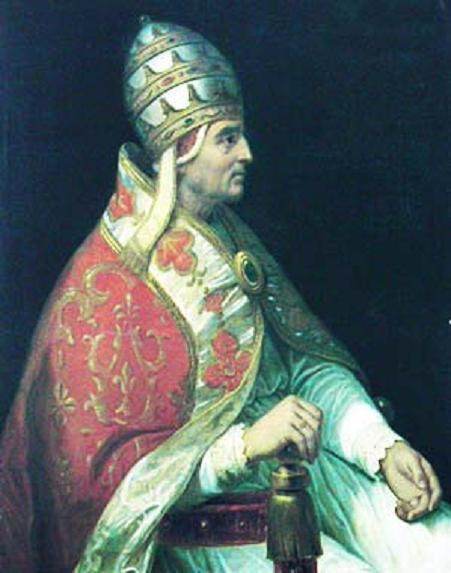
- Portrait - Henri Auguste Calixte César Serrur.

Pope; Confessor
- Born: Guillaume de Grimoard; 1310; Château de Grizac, Le Pont-de-Montvert, Languedoc, Kingdom of France
- Died: 19 December 1370 (aged 60); Avignon, Papal States
- Venerated in: Catholic Church
- Beatified: 10 March 1870, Saint Peter's Basilica, Papal States by Pope Pius IX
- Feast: 19 December
- Attributes: Papal vestments Papal tiara
- Patronage: Architects; Educators; Benedictines; Missionaries

Pope Gregory XI opened the cause of beatification of his predecessor. Urban V's claimed miracles and his virtues were documented. But the cause stopped in 1379 in Rome. It stopped in Avignon in 1390, under the orders of the antipope Clement VII. The Western Schism caused the process to stop, but it was revived centuries later, and led to the beatification of Urban V on 10 March 1870 by Pope Pius IX. His feast day is celebrated on 19 December, the day of his death. This was decided upon by a General Chapter of the Benedictine Order held in 1414.

== See also ==
- Cardinals created by Urban V
- List of popes
- Grimoard
- William Grisaunt, an English physician, thought at one time to be his father

== Books and articles ==
- Albanès, Joseph Mathias Hyacinthe (1897). Actes anciens et documents concernant le Bienheureux Urbain V Pape: sa famille, sa personne, son pontificat, ses miracles et son culte (in French and Latin). Paris: Picard.
- Baluze [Baluzius], Etienne [Stephanus] (1693). Vitae paparum Avenionensium, hoc est, Historia pontificum romanorum qui in Gallia sederunt ab anno Christi MCCCV. usque ad annum MCCCXCIV (in Latin). Vol. Tomus primus. Paris: apud Franciscum Muguet.
- Baluze, Etienne (1693). Vitae Paparum Avenionensium, Hoc est Historia Pontificum Romanorum qui in Gallia sederunt ab anno Christi MCCCV usque ad annum MCCCXCIV (in Latin). Vol. Tomus secundus. Paris: Muguet.
- Baronio, Cesare (1872). Augustin Theiner (ed.). Annales ecclesiastici: A. D. 1–1571 denuo excusi et ad nostra usque tempora perducti ab Augustino Theiner. Vol. Tomus vigesimus sextus (26). [1356–1396]
- Chaillan, Marius (1929). La vieille Église de Saint-Victor de Marseille et le Pape Urbain V: Documents des Archives Vaticanes avec 25 planches hors texte (in French and Latin). Marseille: Tacussel.
- Gibbs, Robert (2011), "Bologna and the Popes: Simone dei Crocefissi's Portraits of Urban V," in: Frojmovic, Eva, ed. (2011). A Wider Trecento: Studies in 13th- and 14th-Century European Art Presented to Julian Gardner. Leiden-New York: Brill. pp. 166–189, at 168–177. ISBN 978-90-04-22651-7.
- Gregorovius, Ferdinand (1906). History of the City of Rome in the Middle Ages. Vol. VI, part 1. Translated by Hamilton, Annie. London: Bell.
- Gregorovius, Ferdinand (1906). History of the City of Rome in the Middle Ages. Vol. VI, part 2. Translated by Hamilton, Annie. Bell.
- Lecacheux, Paul (1897). "La première légation de Guillaume Grimoard en Italie (Juillet- Novembre 1352)". Mélanges d'Archéologie et d'Histoire. 17: 409–440. doi:10.3406/mefr.1897.8146.
- Muratori, Lodovico Antonio (1838). Annali d'Italia ed altre opere varie di Lodovico Antonio Muratori ... (in Italian). Vol. IV. 1358–1687. Milan: Tip. de fratelli Ubicini.
- Prou, Maurice (1887). Étude sur les relations politiques du pape Urbain v avec les rois de France Jean II et Charles V (1362–1370) (in French and Latin). Paris: F. Vieweg.
- Rendina, Claudio (1994). I papi. Storia e segreti. Rome: Newton Compton.
- Renouard, Yves (1970). The Avignon papacy, 1305–1403. Hamden CT USA: Archon Books. ISBN 978-0-208-01156-5.
- Rollo-Koster, Joëlle (2008). Raiding Saint Peter: Empty Sees, Violence, and the Initiation of the Great Western Schism (1378). Brill.
- Rollo-Koster, Joëlle (2015). Avignon and Its Papacy, 1309–1417: Popes, Institutions, and Society. New York-London: Rowman & Littlefield Publishers. ISBN 978-1-4422-1534-4.
- Thibault, Paul R. (1986). Pope Gregory XI: the failure of tradition. Lanham, MD USA: University Press of America. ISBN 978-0-8191-5463-7.
- Vones, Ludwig (1998). Urban V. (1362-1370): Kirchenreform zwischen Kardinalkollegium, Kurie und Klientel (in German). Stuttgart: Anton Hiersemann. ISBN 978-3-7772-9826-9.

Catholic Church titles
Preceded by Innocent VI	Pope; 28 September 1362 – 19 December 1370	Succeeded by Gregory XI
