= Ficara =

Ficara is a surname. Notable people with the surname include:

- Giorgio Ficara (born 1952), Italian essayist and literary critic
- Pierpaolo Ficara (born 1992), Italian cyclist
