= Liber sine nomine =

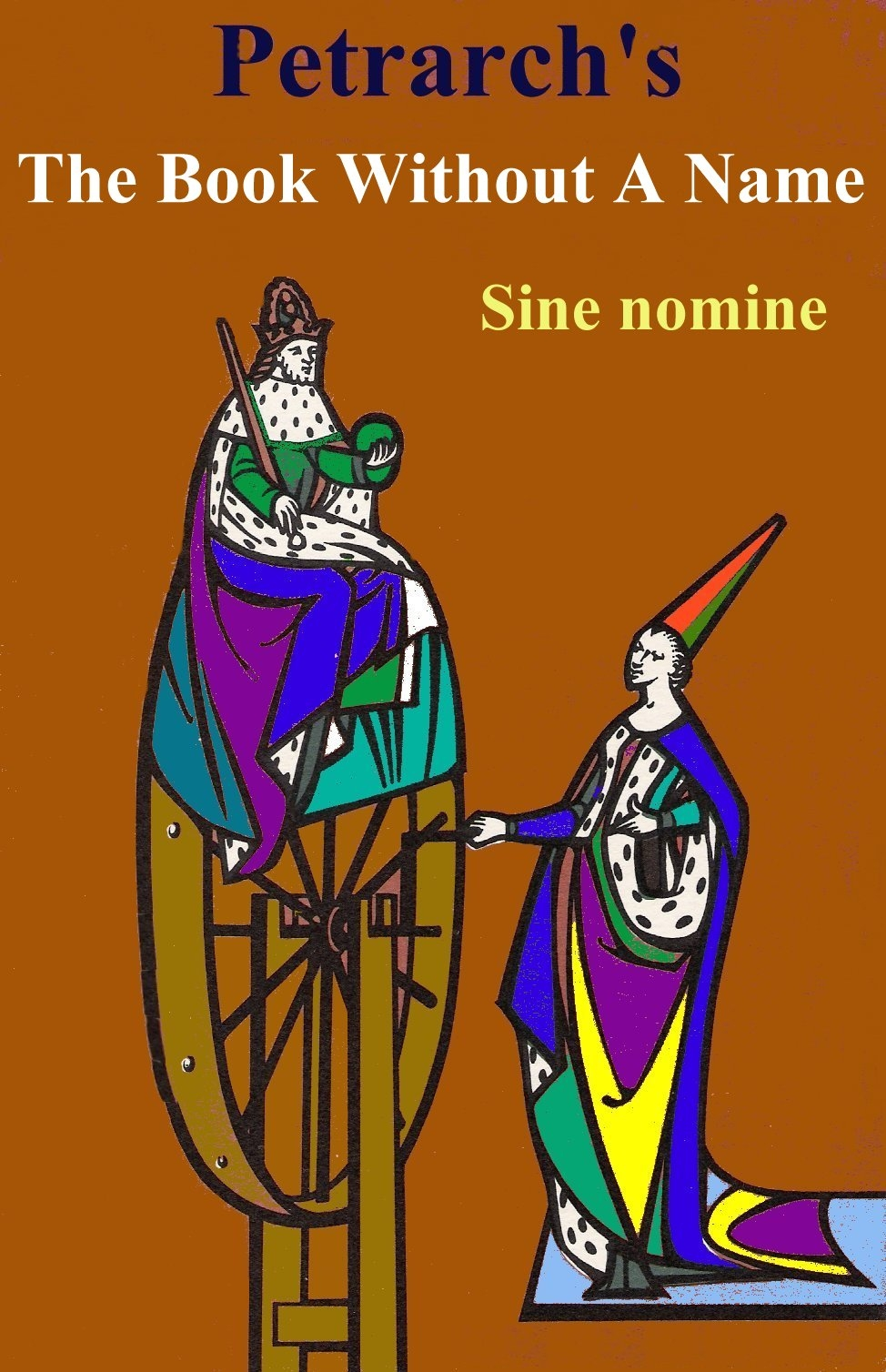
volume without a title which consists of 19 letters

The Liber sine nomine (The Book without a Name) is a collection of nineteen personal letters written in Latin by the fourteenth century Italian poet and Renaissance humanist Petrarch. The letters being harshly critical of the Avignon papacy, they were withheld from the larger collection of his Epistolae familiares (Letters to Friends) and assembled in a separate book. In this fashion, Petrarch reasoned, a reader could throw away this collection, and the other letters to friends could be preserved for posterity.

== Correspondents ==
These letters were sent to his closest friends, who many times were well known figures to the public. So that he would not divulge their identities, he withheld these particular 19 letters and published this book "without a name" on any letter. Among these public figures were Philippe de Cabassoles, bishop of Cavaillon; Cola di Rienzo, a political leader; Francesco Nelli, secretary to the bishop Angelo Acciaioli I; Niccola di Capoccia, a cardinal; Lapo da Castiglionchio of Florence; Rinaldo Cavalchini, the son of the notary Oliviero; Stefano Colonna the Elder, the son of Giovanni Colonna who was one of the most important political figures in Rome; and Ildebrandino Conti, a bishop of Padua. The final letter also included an appendix, addressed to Charles IV, Holy Roman Emperor.

== Cultural references ==
Several other works have used the title Book without a name including those by

- Lady Morgan and Thomas Charles Morgan (1841)
- Theodore Annemann (1931)
- Kit Williams (1984)

== Bibliography ==
- Norman P. Zacour's trans. Liber Sine Nomine titled: Petrarch's Book Without A Name, Pontifical Institute of Mediaeval Studies, Toronto, Canada (1973); ISBN 0-88844-260-2
- Kirkham, Victoria, Petrarch: a critical guide to the complete works, University of Chicago Press, 2009, ISBN 0-226-43741-8
- M.E. Cosenza, Francesco Petrarca and the Revolution of Coli di Rienzo, (Chicago University Press 1913)
- Paul Piur, Petrarca 'Buch ohne Namen' und die papstliche Kuri (Halle/Saale: Max Niemeyer, 1925).
- John E. Wrigley A Papal Secret known to Petrarch, Speculum, XXXIX (1964), pp. 613 – 634.
- E. H. Wilkins, Petrarch's Correspondence, (Padue: Editrice Antenore, 1960).
- E. H. Wilkins, Petrarch at Vaucluse, (University of Chicago Press 1958).
- J.H. Robinson, Petrarch, First Modern Scholar, (New York 1898).
- V. Rossi, Epistolae Familiares, volume 4, (Florence 1926)
- Francesco Petrarca: Cím nélküli könyv - Liber sine nomine, Hungarian translation by Péter Ertl, Lazi Könyvkiadó, 2018, Szeged.
