= Francesco Nelli =

Overview of Florence from Campanile di Giotto

Francesco Nelli (Florence – Naples, 1363) was the secretary of bishop Angelo Acciaioli I and a pastor at the Prior of the Church of the Holy Apostles in Florence. He corresponded with Petrarch, sending fifty surviving letters to him and receiving thirty-eight. Six of the nineteen letters of Petrarch's Liber sine nomine are addressed to Nelli.
