= Otium =

Leisure time in ancient Roman culture

Visitors to Los Angeles' Getty Villa, modeled after the Villa of the Papyri at Herculaneum, get a glimpse of otium as experienced at an ancient Roman villa.

Otium is a Latin abstract term which has a variety of meanings, including leisure time for "self-realization activities" such as eating, playing, relaxing, contemplation, and academic endeavors. It sometimes relates to a time in a person's retirement after previous service to the public or private sector, as opposed to "active public life" (the negative negotium meaning "busy-ness"). Otium can be a temporary or sporadic time of leisure. It can have intellectual, virtuous, or immoral implications.

The concept originally expressed the idea of withdrawing from one's daily business or affairs to engage in activities that were considered to be artistically valuable or enlightening (i.e., speaking, writing, philosophy), and had particular meaning to businessmen, diplomats, philosophers, and poets.

== Early usage ==
In ancient Roman culture otium was a military concept as its first Latin usage. This was in Ennius's Iphigenia.

Otio qui nescit uti
plus negotii habet quam cum est negotium in negotio;
nam cui quod agat institutum est non ullo negotio
id agit, id studet, ibi mentem atque animum delectat suum:
otioso in otio animus nescit quid velit
Hoc idem est; em neque domi nunc nos nec militiae sumus;
imus huc, hinc illuc; cum illuc ventum est, ire illinc lubet.
Incerte errat animus, praeterpropter vitam vivitur.

Translation:

He who does not know how to use leisure
has more of work than when there is work in work.
For to whom a task has been set, he does the work,
desires it, and delights his own mind and intellect:
in leisure, a mind does not know what it wants.
The same is true (of us); we are neither at home nor in the battlefield;
we go here and there, and wherever there is a movement, we are there too.
The mind wanders unsure, except in that life is lived.

— Iphigenia, 241–248

According to historian Carl Deroux in his work Studies in Latin literature and Roman history, the word otium made its earliest extant appearance in Latin literature around 190 BC in a surviving fragment of Ennius's lost tragedy, Iphigenia. (Note: Aulus Gellius, Noctes Atticae, 19, 10. For this fragment as the first instance of otium in the extant literature, see Eleanor Winsor Leach, "Otium as Luxuria: Economy of Status in the Younger Pliny's Letters," Arethusa 36 (2003), p. 148.) (Note: Ennius, frg. XCIX in the edition of Jocelyn, otio qui nescit uti | plus negoti habet quam cum est negotium in negotio, rendered by Jocelyn: "the man who has no job to do and does not know how to employ the resulting leisure has more difficulty than when there is difficulty in a job on hand". For this fragment as the first instance of otium in the extant literature, see Eleanor Winsor Leach, "Otium as Luxuria: Economy of Status in the Younger Pliny's Letters", Arethusa 36 (2003), p. 148.) Quoted later by Aulus Gellius during a discussion of the word praeterpropter ("more or less"), this chorus of soldiers repeatedly contrasts otium (leisure) with negotium (business). Ennius captured the psychological reality of Agamemnon's soldiers marooned at Aulis; stuck in the field during a reprieve from war but forbidden from returning home, they described their stagnant state of inactivity as "more or less" living.

Researchers emphasize that the etymological and semantic use of otium was never a direct translation of the Greek word "schole", but derived from these specifically Roman contexts. Rather than remaining idle doing nothing, the soldiers in the field preferred to return home to tend to their own private affairs (otium). Originally signifying the physical act of stopping a battle, laying down weapons, and entering a time for peace, this military limbo birthed two distinct definitions: otium otiosum, the restless, pointless boredom of unoccupied troops (such as during the winter months when weather did not permit war), and otium negotiosum, a productive "busy leisure" dedicated to personal affairs, a satisfying hobby, or managing one's own estate. This latter form was considered otium privatum (private leisure), which functioned as an equivalent to business.

As Roman culture evolved, otium transitioned from a practical military concept into an elite, prestigious period for self-cultivation. Because ancient Romans maintained a strict, culturally obligatory work ethic, they heavily stigmatized pure idle laziness as an outright waste of time. Consequently, historians note that the Romans re-imagined permissible otium as a time of "laborious leisure"—private time spent away from public or civic obligations (negotium), but heavily filled with personal and intellectual duties instead. Historically, elite otium was considered socially legitimate only when it was dedicated to intellectual activity. While the ruling class utilized this freedom for highly productive personal cultivation, they openly disdained the non-elite, whom they viewed as simply squandering their leisure time.

== Greek philosophers ==
Otium (Latin: leisure) refers to a state of contemplative freedom from practical or political obligations, allowing the pursuit of intellectual, philosophical, or creative activity. While the term itself is Latin, its conceptual roots reach back to Greek thought, particularly the idea of scholē (σχολή), from which the English word “school” derives. For Greek philosophers, scholē denoted not idleness, but the highest form of human activity—time devoted to reflection, dialogue, and the cultivation of the mind and soul. It was the condition necessary for philosophy itself to emerge.

In contrast to negotium (public or business affairs), otium represented the space in which a person could engage with truth, ethics, and the good life without distraction from worldly concerns. For Aristotle, such contemplative leisure was the fulfillment of human purpose, as it enabled theōria—the contemplative life devoted to understanding the eternal. The Stoics and Epicureans also valued otium, though they redefined it according to their doctrines: for the Stoics, as inner tranquility amid worldly duty, and for the Epicureans, as withdrawal from public turmoil to achieve peace of mind (ataraxia). Thus, otium became not mere rest, but a philosophical condition—the freedom to live in accordance with thought.

Cicero and other Roman writers used the word otium in a positive sense—meaning otium is something good, not a laziness—these early philosophers were drawing on the earlier Greek concept of σχολή (scholē), which meant leisure devoted to learning or contemplation.The favorable sense of otium in Ciceronian Latin reflects the Greek term σχολή (skholē, "leisure", a meaning retained in Modern Greek as σχόλη, schólē). "Leisure" having a complex history in Greek philosophy before being used in Latin (through Latin the word became the root of many education-related English terms, such as school, scholar and scholastic). In Athens, leisure was one of the marks of the Athenian gentleman: the time to do things right, unhurried time, time to discuss. From this Athenian sense of otium as discuss, otium became "discussion"; and from there both philosophical and educational schools were both conducted by discussion (see for example, the etymology of lecture). Four major Greek philosophical schools influenced the Roman gentlemen of Cicero's time. Plato (and his contemporaries, if the Greater Hippias be not authentic) brought schole into philosophy; as often, Plato can be quoted on both sides of the question whether leisure is better than the business of a citizen. In the Greater Hippias, it is one weakness of the title character that, although he has the education and manners of a gentleman, he has no leisure; but Socrates, in the Apology, has no leisure either; he is too busy as a gad-fly, keeping his fellow Athenians awake to virtue. However, by the time the Romans encountered Plato's school, the Academy, they (the Athenians) had largely ceased to discuss anything so practical as the good life; the New Academy of Carneades practiced verbal agility and boundless skepticism.

Theophrastus and Dicaearchus, students of Aristotle, debated much on the contemplative life and the active life.

Roman Epicureans used otium for the quiet bliss promised by Epicurus. An Epicurean proverb

It is better to lie on the naked ground and be at ease, than to have a golden coach and a rich table and be worried.

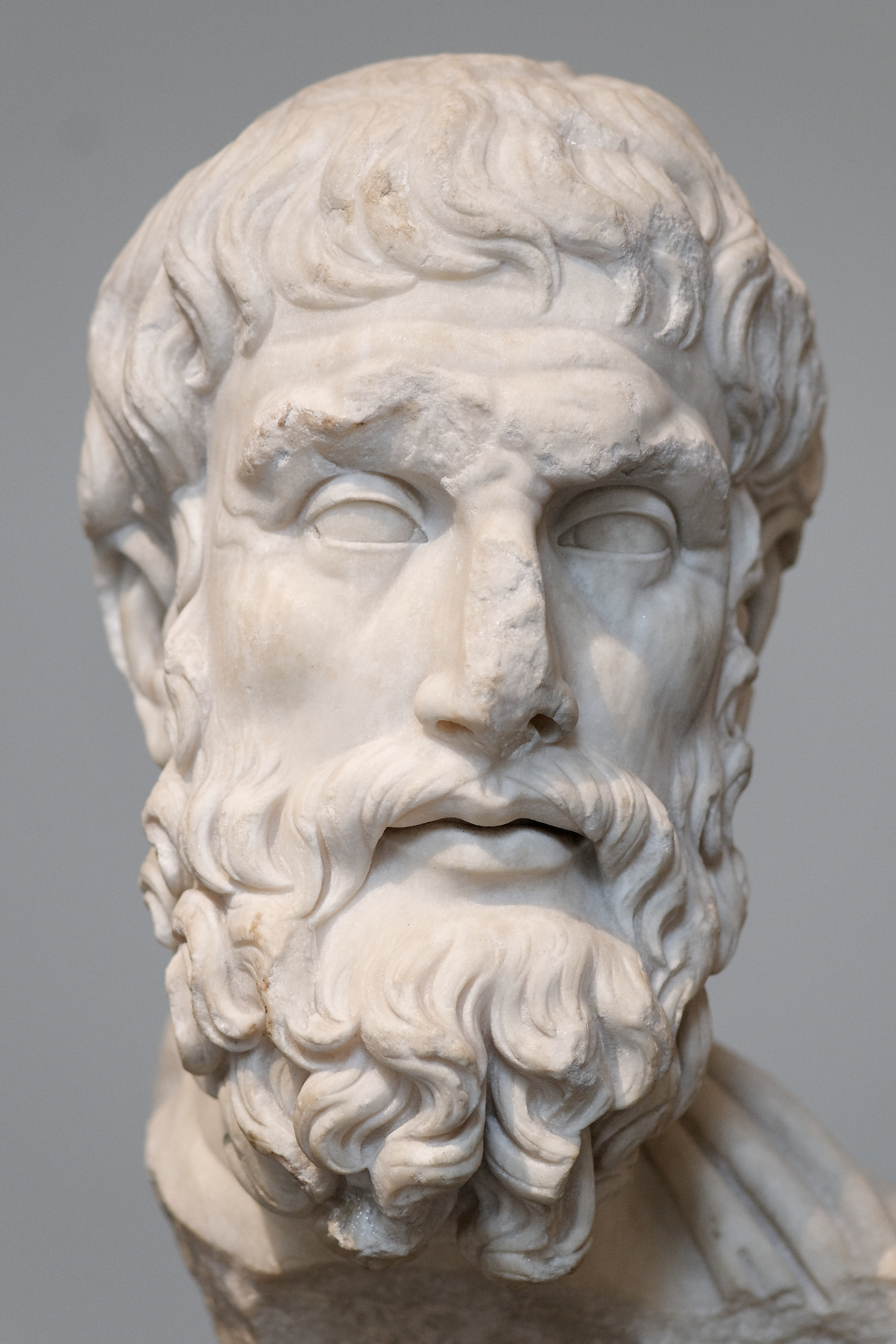
Epicurus

The phrase "to be at ease" can have the meaning "to be of good cheer" or "to be without fear" – these being interdependent. The Epicurean idea of otium favors contemplation, compassion, gratitude and friendship. The Epicurean view is that wisdom has as much to contribute to the benefit of the public as does that of contributions of politicians and laborers (i.e., sailors). The rustic otium concept incorporates country living into Epicureanism. The active city public life of negotium and an otium of reserved country life of reflection have been much written about by Cicero and Seneca the Younger.

Epicurus's philosophy was contrary to Hellenistic Stoicism. Epicurus promised enjoyment in retirement as a concept of otium. The concept of the Epicurean otium (private world of leisure) and the contemplative life were represented in Epicurus' school of philosophy and his garden. The portraits of the Garden of Epicurus near Athens represented political and cultural heroes of the time. Twenty-first–century historians Gregory Warden and David Romano have argued that the layout of the sculptures in "The Garden" were designed to give the viewer contrasting viewpoints of the Epicurean otium and the Hellenistic Stoic viewpoint of otium (i.e. private or public; contemplation or "employment"; otium or negotium).

== Roman Republic ==
In early and colloquial Latin, despite the etymological contrast, otium is often used pejoratively, in contrast rather to officium, "office, duty" than to negotium ('business"). There was a difference established in ancient Roman times (second century BCE and forward) developing the idea elite social status was when one fulfilled one's duties in business and then otium meant "leisure" while negotium meant "non-leisure" (work duties still needed to be done). This new time of otium was filled by Greek scholarly pursuits and Greek pleasures. The time environment within which a person existed had sides to it that were filled with Greek customs such as pastimes, hobbies, interchanges of thoughts and ideas, and private bathing. Otium and negotium was then a new social concept which has perpetuated to our own time.

Historian J. M. Andre concludes that the original sense of otium was related to military service and the idleness that happened in the winter, as opposed to the business (negotium) of the rest of the year. The most ancient Roman calendar divided the year into ten months devoted to war and farming, leaving the winter months of January and February vacant for individual otium. Andre shows that the beauty of the individual otium poses rest. Titus Maccius Plautus in his play Mercator says that while you are young is the time to save up for your retirement otium so you can enjoy it later, in his claim tum in otium te conloces, dum potes, ames (then you may set yourself at your ease, drink and be amorous).

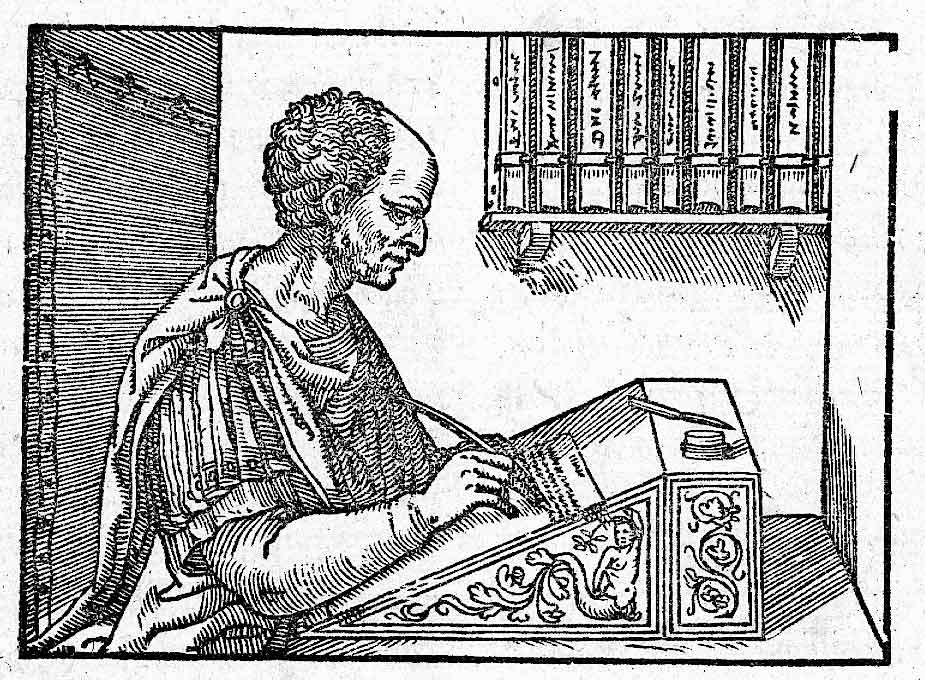
Cicero busy at work

Cicero speaks of himself, with the expression otium cum dignitate, that time spent in activities one prefers is suitable for a Roman citizen who has retired from public life. When he was ousted from each office, this forced an inactive period, which he used for "worthy leisure". During this time he composed Tusculanae Disputationes, a series of books on Stoic philosophy. Cicero saw free time as a time to devote to writing. Cicero defines otium as leisure, avoiding active participation in politics. He further defines it as a state of security and peace (pax) – a type of "public health". It is often associated with tranquillity. Cicero advises in his third book On Duties that when the city life becomes too much, one should retreat to the country for leisure. The term otium cum dignitate in Cicero's Pro Sestio was to mean peace (pax) for all and distinction for some. Cicero says in Pro Sestio, XLV., 98

Id quod est praestantissimum, maximeque optabile omnibus sanis et bonis et beatis, cum dignitate otium.

Translation:

That which stands first, and is most to be desired by all happy, honest and healthy-minded men, is ease with dignity.

Cicero explains that, while not necessarily his cup of tea, he recognized many different ways to spend leisure time and otium. In one passage of De Oratore he explains that Philistus spent his retirement writing history as his otium. He goes on to say in De Oratore Book iii that other men passed their otium of leisure due to bad weather that prevented them from doing their daily chores to playing ball, knucklebones, dice games or just games they made up. Others that were "retired" from public life for whatever reason devoted their otium cum seritio (leisure with service) to poetry, mathematics, music and teaching children.

German historian Klaus Bringmann shows in Cicero's works that one can not characterize him as a hypocrite while in otium because of his sense of duty to serve the state. Cicero's concept of otium does not mean selfish pursuit of pleasure. It means the well-earned leisure which is a culmination of a long career of action and achievement. It's a reward. Idleness (desidia) had derogatory implications and unqualified otium was a problem for Cicero's elite group of followers. Its break away from civic affairs contrasted with negotia publica, participation in civic affairs of the republican aristocracy. To distinguish between plain "idleness" and aristocratic otium honestum, otium liberale or otium cum dignitate, writers of the day said that literary and philosophical pursuits were worthwhile activities and that they had benefit to res publica (the general public). These pursuits were a type of 'employment' and therefore not mere laziness.

Cicero praises Cato the Elder for his respectful use of otium in his expression non-minus otii quam negotii ("no less for doing nothing than business"). Cicero was associating otium with writing and thinking when he admires Cato for pointing out that Scipio Africanus claimed he was "never less idle than when he was at leisure, and never less lonely than when he was alone." Cicero in his De Officiis (book III, 1–4) further says of Scipio Africanus "Leisure and solitude, which serve to make others idle, in Scipio's case acted as a goad." Cicero's idea of otium cum dignitate ("leisure with dignity") is considerably different from today's version of the concept. In his time, this kind of "free time" was only for the few privileged elite and was mostly made possible by the toil of slaves. It was associated with an egotistic and arrogant lifestyle, compared to those who had to earn their own living with no slaves. Today technology and educational systems enter into the equation on making leisure time (otium) available to almost everyone, not just the privileged elite, which enables the pursuit of hobbies. Cicero has a number of different concept versions for otium. In one concept he feels that a lifetime of loyalty attending one's duty (maximos labores) should be rewarded with some form of retirement. This then promotes great sacrifices which promotes civic peace with honor within the state. He points out that the tranquillity one enjoys is due to the efforts of the majority. This concept of retirement through a lifetime of work was enjoyed only by the ruling class and the elite. The common people could only hope to enjoy a leisurely retirement with dignity as an inheritance.

Catullus, a late Roman Republic poet, in his poems shows that the significance of otium of the middle Republican time of autonomy into the concept of how, why, and when a member of the patronal class might exchange political activity for literary leisure. He tended to mark otium with erotic influence.

Otium, Catulle, tibi molestum est;
Otio exsultas nimiumque gestis;
Otium et reges prius et beatas
perdidit urbes.

Translation:

Leisure, Catullus, is mischievous to you:
You revel in and desire leisure too much:
Leisure has previously destroyed kings and
bountiful cities.

— 51.13–16

=== Imperial Rome ===
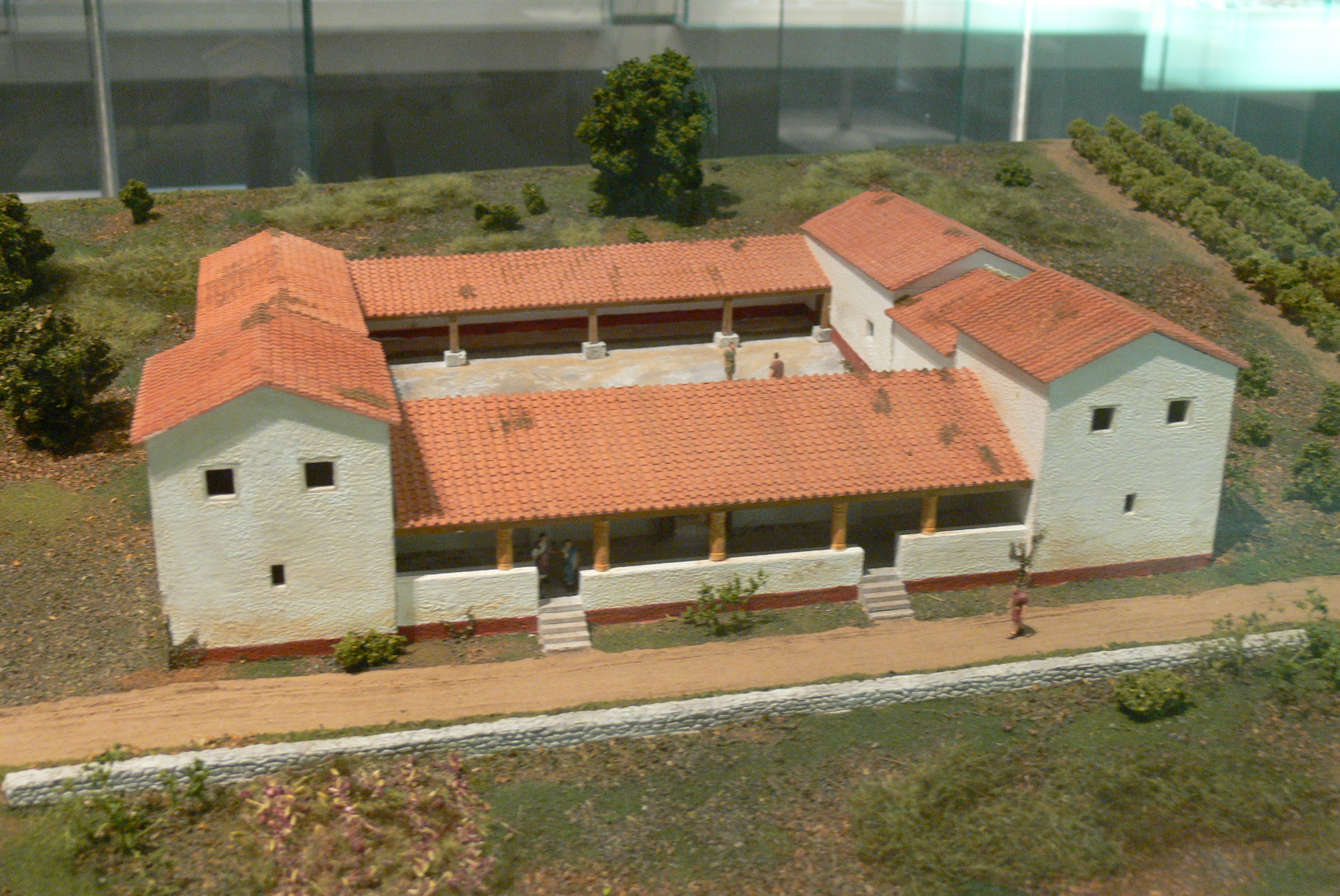
A modern reconstruction of a Roman villa

The imperial dictatorship by Augustus during the fall of the Roman Republic put the Roman ruling classes into a state of change as their traditional role as always being in town was no longer needed. They were given much leisure time (otium) because of their wealth. The wives of wealthy men were known to write poetry in special rooms devoted to education of the entire family (except the master of the house as it would have been below his dignity).

The home of choice then became the countryside villa as the rise of the Roman Empire made some Romans even wealthier. Some, especially among the large and middle class Roman landowners, could afford almost anything they could dream up in the way of a residence. Greek-style architecture became their new villa otium outside of town. In ancient Roman times the "otium villa" was a Dionysian idealistic rural home setting that evoked peace, leisure, simplicity and serenity. Often in ancient writings is found the mention of restorative powers due its natural setting (otium) in the rural country home, contrasted to the busy city life with all the businesses (negotium). The "villa with a garden" and "villa by the sea" was associated with otium. The life at the Roman villa was associated with Greek culture in rooms which had Greek themes indicating a "superior world" of living.

The Imperial Roman poet Statius writes of an "otium villa" that he planned to retire to in Naples in his work Silvae: "It has secure peace, an idle life of leisure, non-troubled rest and sleep. There is no madness in the market-place, no strict laws in dispute ...". Pliny the Younger exemplified the philosophy of the Roman elite in otium of the time by the life he lived from his "otium villas". He would dictate letters to his secretary, read Greek and Latin speeches, go on walks on the villa's grounds, dine and socialize with friends, meditate, exercise, bathe, take naps and occasionally hunt.

Tibullus was an Augustan elegiac poet who offered an alternative lifestyle to the Roman ideal of the military man or the man of action. He preferred the country lifestyle. In his existing first two books of poetry he compares the lifestyle of his chief friend and patron Marcus Valerius Messalla Corvinus as a commander and soldier to that of a farmer. Tibullus in his poem 1.3 rejects the work style of the rich man, adsiduus labor, and military service (militia). He shows in his poetry that originally otium was a military concept, the disuse of one's weapons. Tibullus prefers the rustic agricultural landscape and a simple life. He indicates that while he would do agricultural work, he would only be interested in doing it sometimes (interdum) and therefore inserts otium (peace and leisure time) into agricultural life. He expresses in his attitude of his poetry that the qualities of the Epicurean resolve to quietism (occultism – religious mysticism) and pacifism (abstention from violence) as the pursuits of ignobile otium (mean leisure) – peace of mind (peace with one's self) and detachment from worldly ambitions.

Seneca compares the difference in the Epicurean and Stoic choice of otium. He confesses that classic Stoicism urges active public life while Epicurus has a tendency not to advance public life unless forced to. Seneca views Stoicism and Epicureanism as legitimate to inaction in the proper situations. He defends the Stoic philosophy as leaning toward otium. The main responsibility for the Stoic is to benefit the public in some manner. This could be done by the cultivation of virtue or the research of nature in retirement. This would mean a life of meditation and contemplation rather than an active political life. Seneca shows that otium is not really "free time", but a study of other matters (i.e., reading, writing) other than political and career gains.

Retirees retreating to rural villas increased as writers of the day wrote that Stoic ways included pursuits of reading, writing and philosophy. This meant that the work of public duties was replaced by otium liberale (liberal leisure) and was sanctified if the retiree did pursuits of reading, writing and philosophy. The benefits of the simplicity of rustic country life was reinforced in the intellectual legitimacy of otium ruris (rural leisure) because it drew out the spiritual implications of Horatian and Vergilian images of this type of life. Seneca's doctrine of De Otio describes retirement from public life. The contemplative life that Seneca revised was a Roman debate on otium (a productive peaceful time) and at some point in the evolution of the term was later contrasted to negotium.

These are some of the elements in Seneca's doctrine of De Otio:

1. virtue, freedom and happiness by reasoning.
2. the military metaphor.
3. that the virtuous person chooses statio, a specific place for doing one's 'employment'.
4. otium (leisure) is still negotium (business) even if withdrawal from public activity.
5. that the virtuous person's otium, as a citizen of the universe, is the field for the performance of his duty.

=== Later writers ===
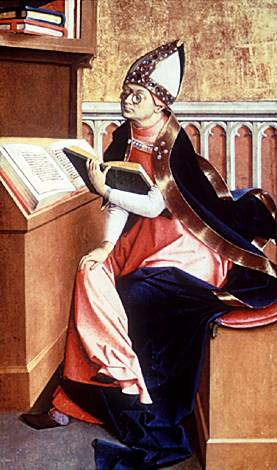
Augustine studying

While Seneca's doctrine appears to be close to the doctrine of Athenodorus's De Tranquillitate it is basically different. In De Otio 3.5 Seneca points out the benefits towards man in general, while in De Tranquillitate the theme is peace of mind.

Saint Augustine of Hippo reminded Romans of otium philosophandi, a positive element, that life was happiest when one had time to philosophize. Augustine points out that otium was the prerequisite for contemplation. It was because of otium that Alypius of Thagaste steered Augustine away from marriage. He said that they could not live a life together in the love of wisdom if he married. Augustine described Christianae vita otium as the Christian life of leisure. Many Christian writers of the time interpreted the Roman idea of otium as the deadly sin of acedia (sloth). Some Christian writers formulated otium as meaning to serve God through deep thought. Christian writers encouraged biblical studies to justify otium. These same Christian writers also showed otium ruris (secluded rural leisure) as a needed step to monastic propositum. Augustine describes the monastic life as otium sanctum (sanctified leisure or approved leisure). In Augustine's time the idea of philosophy had two poles of ambitions – one to be a worthy Christian (vacation – negotium) and the other to be a worthy friend of God (devotion – otium).

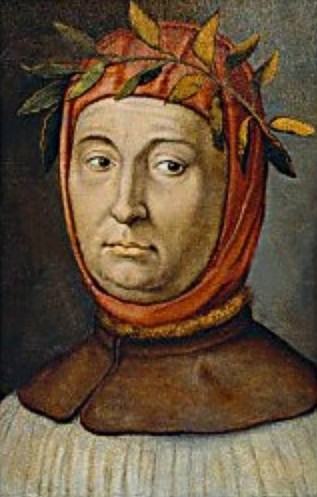
Petrarch

Petrarch, 14th-century poet and Renaissance humanist, discusses otium in his De vita solitaria as it relates to a human life of simple habits and self-restraint. Like his favorite Roman authors Cicero, Horace, Seneca, Ovid and Livy, he sees otium not as leisure time devoted to idleness, passion, entertainment or mischievous wrongdoing; but time ideally spent on nature appreciation, serious research, meditation, contemplation, writing and friendship.

Petrarch considered solitude (i.e., rural setting, "villa otium", his Vaucluse home) and its relationship to otium as a great possession for a chance at intellectual activity, the same philosophy as Cicero and Seneca. He would share such a precious commodity with his best friends in the spirit of Seneca when he said "no good thing is pleasant to possess without friends to share it".

Historian Julia Bondanella translates Petrarch's Latin words of his own personal definition of otium:

... ought it not to be my first aim to have my leisure as remote from idleness as my life is from active affairs?

Petrarch stressed the idea of an active mind even in otium (leisure). He refers back to Augustine's Vetus Itala in De otio religioso where in Christianity it was associated with contemplation and vacatio (vacate – be still). He points out that this is associated with videre (to see), which in Christianity is physical and mental activity aimed at moral perfection. He relates this concept of otium as vacate et videte (be still and see – a form of meditation, contemplation). Petrarch points out that one should not take leisure as so relaxed as to weaken the mind, but to be active in leisure to build up strength in the view of a unique character and religion.

Andrew Marvell's seventeenth-century poem The Garden is a lyric of nine stanzas in which he rejects all forms of activity in the world in favor of solitude of the retiree in a garden. It is a type of retirement poem expressing the love of retirement – an ancient Roman concept related to otium. The poem shows the high degree of pleasure of rural retirement. Some critics see that he shows otium to mean peace, quiet and leisure – a goal for retirement from politics and business. Others see a Christianized otium with Marvell showing a representation of the progress of a soul from the pursuit for the pagan promised land of the peaceful countryside and contemplation to the search for the lost heaven on earth.

Part of Marvell's poem "The Garden" below:

What wondrous life in this I lead!
Ripe apples drop about my head;
The luscious clusters of the vine
Upon my mouth do crush their wine;
The nectarine and curious peach
Into my hands themselves do reach;
Stumbling on melons as I pass,
Insnared with flowers, I fall on grass.

Meanwhile, mind, from pleasure less,
Withdraws into its happiness:
The mind, that ocean where each kind
Does straight its own resemblance find;
Yet it creates, transcending these,
Far other worlds, and other seas;
Annihilating all that's made
To a green thought in a green shade.

Here at the fountain's sliding foot,
Or at some fruit-tree's mossy root,
Casting the body's vest aside,
My soul into the boughs does glide:
There like a bird it sits and sings,
Then whets and combs its silver wings;
And, till prepared for longer flight,
Waves in its plumes the various light.

Such was that happy garden-state,
While man there walked without a mate:
After a place so pure and sweet,
What other help could yet be meet!
But 'twas beyond a mortal's share
To wander solitary there:
Two paradises 'twere in one
To live in Paradise alone.

Brian Vickers, a 20th-century British literary scholar, points out an expression made by Friedrich Nietzsche, a 19th-century German philosopher, on scholars' opinion of otium in his 1878 publication Menschliches, Allzumenschliches:

Scholars are ashamed of otium. But there is something noble about leisure and idleness.—If idleness really is the beginning of all vice, then it is at any rate in the closest proximity to all virtue; the idle man is always a better man than the active.—But when I speak of leisure and idleness, you do not think I am alluding to you, do you, you sluggards? (Note: Nietzsche, Menschliches, Allzumenschliches. 1.284, "Zu Gunsten der Müssigen", in Friedrich Nietzsche, Sämtliche Werke, ed. G. Colli and M. Montinari (15 vols., Berlin, 1967) II (1967). 132.) (Note: Friedrich Nietzsche (1914), Human, All Too Human: A Book For Free Spirits, Part I, translated by Helen Zimmern, "Fifth Division: The Signs of Higher and Lower Culture, In Favour of the Idle": "As a sign that the value of a contemplative life has decreased, scholars now vie with active people in a sort of hurried enjoyment, so that they appear to value this mode of enjoying more than that which really pertains to them, and which, as a matter of fact, is a far greater enjoyment. Scholars are ashamed of otium. But there is one noble thing about idleness and idlers. If idleness is really the beginning of all vice, it finds itself, therefore, at least in near neighbourhood of all the virtues; the idle man is still a better man than the active. You do not suppose that in speaking of idleness and idlers I am alluding to you, you sluggards?")

== Private life and public life meanings ==
Private life meaning of otium meant personal retirement – the opposite of business. It meant leisure only for one's own pleasure with no benefit to the state or public. Examples here is where one attends only his own farm or estate. Another is hunting. It was the opposite of "active public life". One would not be a historian in this case.

In public life otium meant public peace and relief after war. It meant freedom from the enemy with no hostilities. It was not only freedom from external assault (the enemy), it was also freedom from internal disorder (civil war). This then had the meaning of leisure, peace and safety at the homeland. This eventually became the status quo: acceptance of existing political and social conditions of the local laws, the custom of the ancestors, the powers of magistrates, authority of the senate, religions, the military, the treasury, and the praise of the empire.

== Other uses ==
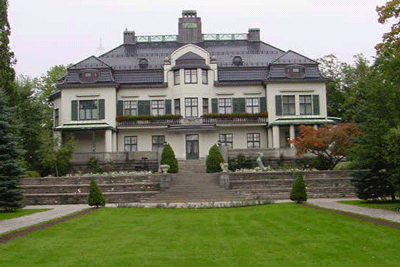
Villa Otium Norway US embassy residence

- The term cum dignitate otium ("leisure with dignity") is found in Cicero's writings and refers to an aim and purpose of the Optimates.
- "Leisure without literature is death and burial for a living man." – a quote from Seneca the Younger.
- "Leisure is a system of symbols which acts to establish a feeling of freedom and pleasure by formulating a sense of choice and desire."
- "Mr. Morgan was enjoying his otium in a dignified manner, surveying the evening fog, and smoking a cigar ..."
- The Art Nouveau or Jugendstyle residence of the United States Ambassador to Norway is called the Villa Otium. (Note: By Norwegian architect Henrik Bull. The building was inspired by Russian architecture, and was built for Hans Andreas Olsen, who had encountered it when he was the Consul General for Norway at St. Petersburg, Russia with his wife Ester, the niece of Alfred Nobel. "Ambassador's Residence in Oslo; 'Villa Otium'". U.S. Department of State. Archived from the original on 15 October 2011.)
- Otium is the name of several USCG documented yachts.

== Synonyms ==
Otium carried with it many different meanings (including but not limited to time, chance, opportunity), depending on the time period or the philosophers involved in determining the concept.

=== Positive sense ===
Synonyms of positive connotations are:

- quies: rest, repose, relief from toil.
- requies: rest, repose, rest from labor, a hobby.
- tranquilitas: tranquility, calm, quiet.
- peace: as a state or condition of freedom from external enemies.
- pax: to pacify or appease, as the outcome of diplomatic conference and agreement with an enemy.

=== Negative sense ===
Synonyms of negative connotations are:

- inhonestum otium: dishonorable leisure, idle self-indulgence leisure.
- desidia: slackness, idleness.
- inertia: sloth, idleness, indolence.
- ignavia: sloth, idleness, faint-heartedness.
- desidiosissimum otium: a sluggard's free time, he that fears labor; a man careless to attend to his duty first.

== See also ==
- Italian Renaissance garden
- Sabbatical
