= Rinaldo Cavalchini =

14th-century Italian author

Rinaldo Cavalchini (1291–1362) lived in Villafranca di Verona near Verona and was better known as Rinaldo from Villafranca.

== Life ==
He was the son of the notary Oliviero and worked at the Della Scala family court. He was a poet as well as a humanist. He was a close friend of Petrarch and was a tutor for his son Giovanni. Petrarch communicated with him and he is mentioned in Petrarch's sine nomine in letter eleven asking for Petrarch's help in getting employed in the papal curia at Avignon.

He is famous for the epitaphs he wrote for Cangrande I della Scala and Mastino II della Scala. The lineage of Cavalchini died at the end of 1400.

== See also ==
- House of Scaliger
- Book Without A Name
- A short biography of Rinaldo Cavalchini on the Comune di Villafranca website (in Italian)
