= Giorgio Ficara =

Italian essayist and literary critic

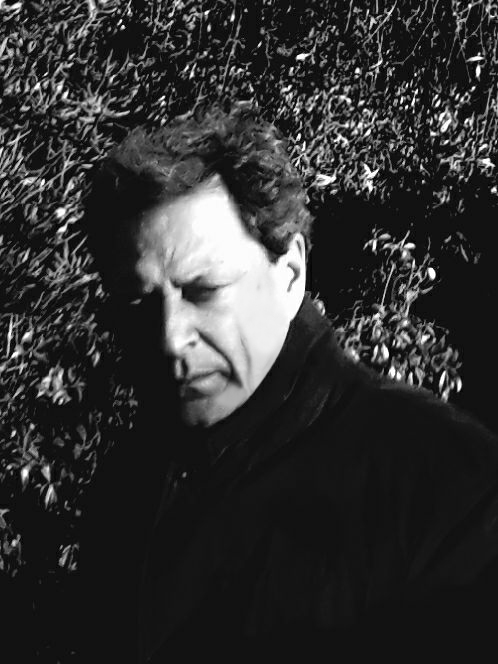
Giorgio Ficara

Giorgio Ficara (born 20 June 1952) is an Italian essayist and writer. He is Full Professor of Italian Literature at the University of Turin.

== Biography ==
Born in Turin in 1952, Ficara attended the city’s Jesuit classical high school. A student of Giovanni Getto, he received his baccalaureate from the University of Turin in 1974 with an undergraduate thesis on Gabriele D'Annunzio. From 1975 to 1981 he was Assistant to the Chair of Italian Literature, a post held by Getto. From 1982 to 1999 he was a research fellow and lecturer; from 1999 to the present he has held the position of Full Professor and Chair of Italian Literature at the University of Turin’s Atheneum.

Ficara was co-director of Nuovi Argomenti (1989-1999) and literary critic for Panorama (1988 – 1997) and La Stampa (1978 - 2012). He currently collaborates with the Sunday edition of Il Sole 24 Ore and is co-director of Lettere italiane, a journal founded by Vittore Branca and Giovanni Getto. He is a corresponding member of the Lorenzo Valla Foundation and the Bembo Foundation.

Ficara has been a visiting professor in the United States at UCLA, Stanford University, the University of Chicago and at Columbia University. He has also taught in Paris at the Sorbonne and at the Collège de France, as well as in various European universities. Literary critic, historian of literature and of literary-philosophical systems, and comparatist, his areas of study are Francesco Petrarca, Giacomo Leopardi, Giacomo Casanova and eighteenth-century European literature, Alessandro Manzoni, and twentieth-century Italian literature, with a particular interest in Montale and the question of the novel’s origins.

His literary criticism merges non-fiction and textual criticism in order to elucidate the hermeneutics of the literary work: “Why is criticism always less an explanation of and commentary on the text and more an alternative to a text that does not exist? Or rather: why is criticism itself no longer necessary for a work that explains everything on its own? [...] Contingent upon the writer’s ‘original' prose, the critic’s applied prose exists, in effect, because the other text exists even more.”

"Ficara is one of those scholars who believes that (and attempts to put into practice) the writer’s contribution should not be viewed as secondary with respect to the professional contribution of the critic. Writing is a different means of speaking about literature, a more free, or more vertiginous or concise means to say the same things as the critic. [...] Ficara, who has set out on this particular path, is quite adept at concocting these mixtures of narration and interpretation, these moments and flashes in which we don’t know whether the narrator or the critic will prevail" (Gian Luigi Beccaria, Stile Novecento: il romanzo delle idee, "Tuttolibri-La Stampa", 16 June 2007, p. 5).

"For Ficara what matters is the struggle, leading to an exchange of position, between narrative play and the awakening of the conscience: 'pure play in Laurence Sterne', 'play that yields to awareness in Alessandro Manzoni', 'dream-play of the conscience in Italo Calvino'. Fiction exists in the service of truth and truth does not exist without storytelling and without a 'crossroads of perspectives.’" (Alfonso Berardinelli, Il Novecento davanti a noi, Il Sole 24 Ore, 13 January 2008, p. 37).

== Prizes ==
- 1984 Borgia Prize for Essay Writing from the Accademia Nazionale dei Lincei
- 1993 Lerici Prize (for Solitudini)
- 1999 Ischia Prize (for Casanova e la malinconia)
- 2010 Casinò di San Remo Libro del Mare Prize (for Riviera)
- 2010 Tarquinia-Cardarelli Prize for Literary Criticism
- 2011 Prize for Essay Writing from the Accademia Nazionale dei Lincei

== Works ==
=== Monographs ===
- Solitudini. Studi sulla letteratura italiana dal Duecento al Novecento, Milan, Garzanti Editore, 1993
- Il punto di vista della natura. Saggio su Leopardi, Genoa, Il melangolo, 1996, ISBN 978-88-7018-303-0
- Casanova e la malinconia, Turin, Einaudi, 1999, ISBN 9788806146214
- Stile Novecento, Venice, Marsilio Editori, 2007, ISBN 978-88-317-9221-9
- Riviera. La via lungo l'acqua, Turin, Einaudi, 2010, ISBN 9788806157302
- Montale sentimentale, Venice, Marsilio, 2012, ISBN 978-88-317-1251-4
- Lettere non italiane, Milan, Bompiani, 2016, ISBN 8845282023
- Lettura del "Canto notturno", Turin, Einaudi ebook, i.c.s.
- Vite libertine. Le mille e una notte della ragione, Turin, Einaudi, i.c.s.

=== Editions e commentaries ===
- Giuseppe Parini, Il Giorno, Milan, Mondadori, 1984, ISBN 9788804284024
- Alessandro Manzoni, I promessi sposi, Turin, Petrini Editore, 1986
- Giacomo Leopardi, Canti, Milan, Mondadori, 1987, ISBN 9788804531364
- Giacomo Leopardi, Operette Morali, Milan, Mondadori, 1988, ISBN 9788804557289
- Giacomo Leopardi, Lettere, Milan, Mondadori, 1991
- Francesco Petrarca, De vita solitaria, Milan, Mondadori, 1992
- Giacomo Leopardi, Memorie e pensieri d'amore, Turin, Einaudi, 1993, ISBN 9788806134235
- Francesco De Sanctis, Storia della Letteratura Italiana, Turin, Einaudi-Gallimard, 1996, ISBN 9788844600471
- Mario Praz, Bellezza e bizzarria. Saggi critici, Milan, Mondadori, 2002, ISBN 9788804500698
- Con L. Marcozzi, Viaggio tra i capolavori della letteratura italiana, Milan, Skira, 2011, ISBN 9788857209944

=== Selected articles ===
- Prefazione a Francesco Biamonti, Le parole e la notte, Turin, Einaudi, 2014, pp. i-xiv, ISBN 9788806218584
- Prefazione a Mario Novaro, Murmuri ed Echi, critical edition by V. Pesce, Genoa, San Marco Giustiniani, 2011
- Lo spirito del luogo del Gattopardo, in Il Gattopardo at Fifty, ed. by D. Messina, Ravenna, Longo, 2010, pp. 69–72, ISBN 978-88-8063-648-9
- Petites maisons, in "Levia gravia", 12, 2010, pp. 211–215
- La filosofia della vita di Marziano Guglielminetti, in Atti del Convegno Marziano Guglielminetti. Un viaggio nella letteratura, ed. by C. Allasia and L. Nay, Turin, Edizioni dell'Orso, 2009, pp. 93–97
- Amici per l'eternità. Preface to Giorgio Caproni- Carlo Betocchi, Una poesia indimenticabile: lettere, 1936-1986, ed. by D. Santero, Lucca, Pacini Fazzi, 2007, pp. 5–8
- Cercatore d'infinito. Saggio su Luzi., in "Studi italiani", 16-17, 2005, pp. 9–14
- Francesco e la via difficile., in Francesco Biamonti: le parole, il silenzio. Atti del Convegno di Studi Francesco Biamonti: le parole, il silenzio, San Biagio della Cima, Centro culturale Le Rose; Bordighera, Chiesa anglicana, 16-18 ottobre 2003, ed. by A. Aveto and F. Merlani, Genoa, Il melangolo, 2005, pp. 17 sgg.
- Homo fictus, in Franco Moretti (ed.), Il romanzo, vol. IV: Temi, luoghi, eroi, Turin, Einaudi, 2003, pp. 641–658
- Getto, Manzoni e l'aria di casa, in "Lettere italiane", 3, 2003, pp. 392–398
- Introduction to Mario Praz, Bellezza e bizzarria. Saggi scelti, Milan, Mondadori, 2002, pp. i-lxxvi
- L'eternità infranta: illusionismi dannunziani., in "Lettere italiane", 3, 2002, pp. 149–170
- Introduction to Francesco De Sanctis, Storia della letteratura italiana, ed. by G. Ficara, Turin, Einaudi-Gallimard, 1996, pp. ix-xxxii
- Introduction to Giacomo Leopardi, Memorie e pensieri d'amore, Turin, Einaudi, 1993, pp. i-xlii
- Introduction to Francesco Petrarca, De vita solitaria, ed. by G. Ficara, Milan, Mondadori, 1992, pp. v-xxxiv
- Su mari analoghi. Introduction to Giacomo Leopardi, Operette morali, ed. by G. Ficara, Milan, Mondadori, 1988, pp. 5–27
- Il punto di vista della natura. Introduction to Giacomo Leopardi, Canti, ed. by G. Ficara, Milan, Mondadori, 1987, pp. 7–33
- Le parole e la peste in Manzoni, in "Lettere italiane", 31, 1, 1981, pp. 3–37
- Renzo, l'allievo delle Muse, in "Lettere italiane", 19, 1, 1977, pp. 34–58

== Bibliography ==
- Enzo Siciliano, Quanta solitudine nel Giovin Signore, "Corriere della Sera", 18 July 1993, p. 20
- Michel David, Malinconico Casanova, "Modern Language Review", 96, 2001, pp. 535–537 (Italian version)
- Gian Luigi Beccaria, Stile Novecento: il Romanzo delle idee, "Tuttolibri - La Stampa", 16 June 2007, p. 5
- Giorgio Ficara, in Dizionario della critica militante. Letteratura e mondo contemporaneo, a c. di Giuseppe Leonelli e Filippo La Porta, Milan, Bompiani, 2007
- Alfonso Berardinelli, Il Novecento davanti a noi, "Il Sole 24 Ore", 13 January 2008, p. 37
- Raffaele La Capria, La Liguria insegue l'orizzonte (non come la mia Napoli), "Corriere della Sera", 11 June 2010, p. 48
- Paolo Mauri, Ricordi e poesia della Riviera, "Repubblica", 11 June 2010
- Massimo Onofri, Il sentimento di Clizia, "Il Sole 24 ore", 22 April 2012, p. 25
- Raffaele Manica, Montale. Spirito e lettera sul ring dei "Mottetti", "Alias-Il manifesto", 10 June 2012, p. 5
