= De vita solitaria =

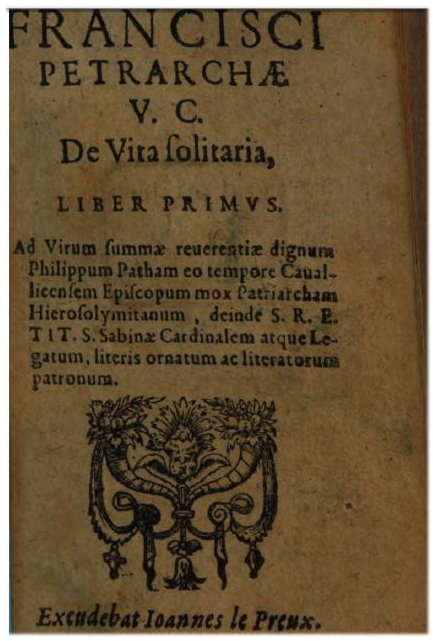
Cover for a 1600 edition of De Vita solitaria

De vita solitaria ("Of Solitary Life" or "On the Solitary Life"; translated as The Life of Solitude) is a philosophical treatise composed in Latin and written between 1346 and 1356 (mainly in Lent of 1346) by Italian Renaissance humanist Petrarch. It constitutes an apology of solitude dedicated to his friend Philippe de Cabassoles.

== Argument ==
Solitude is necessary for a life of contemplation, for both saints (such as Augustine or Pope Celestine V) and philosophers. Petrarch merged the medieval interest in spiritual meditation with Cicero's idea of philosophical otium. His idea of a happy life is that of meditative retirement in the peace of the countryside, where it is possible to pursue both literary studies and religious meditation away from the distractions of urban life also referred to as the "active life" .

== Contents ==
Petrarch divided this work into two books from the beginning. A later translator further broke it down into tractate sections and chapters. The elaborate chapter titles were not in the original.

=== Book 1 ===
==== First Tractate ====
In the first chapter, Petrarch talks in this book of needful to those that desire peace and quiet. He talks of "men of learning" desiring solitude for contemplation.

In the second chapter, he addresses the experiences of the life of solitude. He indicates that while others may have written on the life of solitude, he draws mostly from his own experiences rather than that of a stranger. He prefers to use his own experiences as a "guide" to what a life of solitude is.

In the third chapter, he states that there is a single idea underlying the observations of the life of busyness and the life of solitude being opposites. One life leads to grievous worry, while the other attains happy leisure. He says that he dislikes the adversities that happen in crowds and a populous environment, while solitude promotes happy leisure and more favorable results with peace and tranquility.

==== Second Tractate ====
In the first chapter, Petrarch discusses two types of people. One is the city dweller who awakens in the middle of the night thinking of his clients with falsehoods. He thinks how he may be able to drive a corrupt bargain with ill-gotten profit gains or betraying his friends or his seductions for his neighbor's wife to tempt her away from her loyalty. He looks for whatever mischief he can create. He begins before dawn on his quest to corruption. Contrast this to the retired man, a man of leisure that is fully rested and happy when he arises. He praises God for the gifts he has received, which can not be matched by the luxury items of the busy man. He immediately engages in an honest task or an agreeable lesson. He then waits for sunrise with calmness of mind. He has a happy heart and peace of mind with good intentions for his upcoming daily activities.

In the second chapter, he talks of the daily sunrise. Each man, businessman and retiree, has their own prayers. The businessman is greeted at the doorway by enemies and friends; complaints and lawsuits. They engage him and immediately take up his time in different directions, whatever the business is or whatever the argument. The retiree, on the other hand, has a free doorway. He can pass through or not and choose whatever activity he desires or no activity. The choice is strictly up to him. The retiree takes on a serene day of leisure and calm, while the businessman is dreaded with complaints and problems. The retiree goes for walks in the woods and smells the flowers caring not about gold or jewels. The businessman slaves under a cruel day to make even more money than before or keep others from getting what he already made. He plots to ruin another businessman or dishonestly swindle an innocent. He hides in shame at the end of his day in his home pulling the curtains for concealment. Petrarch then asks who spent their hours more truthfully.

=== Book 2 ===
==== First Tractate ====
In the first chapter, Petrarch states that philosophers, holy men and poets always sought for themselves solitude for contemplation. He explains in detail how they achieved higher levels of understanding through solitude.

==== Second Tractate ====
In the second chapter, Petrarch talks of Adam, parent of the human race. He explains that while Adam was alone he lived in peace and happiness with much joy. As soon as he received a companion, however, he lived in labor and sorrow. Alone he was immortal, with a woman he was mortal. By this he shows what posterity can hope for from the accompaniment of a woman.

== Editions ==
There are over 120 manuscript copies that still exist of De vita solitaria, which demonstrates its popularity through the centuries.

- Petrarch, Francis (1978) [1924]. The Life of Solitude. Translated by Zeitlin, Jacob (Reprint ed.). Urbana: University of Illinois Press. ISBN 0-88355-594-8.

(Original 1926 review of this English translation available here on the JSTOR website.)

- Petrarca, Francesco (1879). La Vita solitaria [The Solitary Life] (in Italian). Ceruti, Antonio (tr.). Bologna: Presso Gaetano Romagnoli. p. 250.
