= Philippe de Cabassoles =

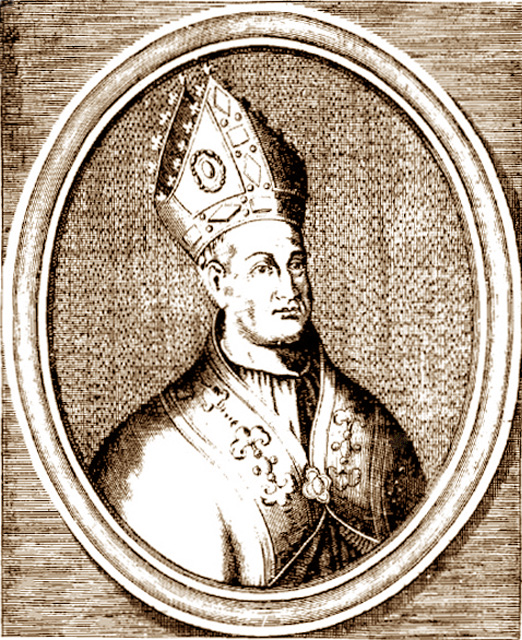
- Born: 1305; Avignon; Cavaillon, France
- Died: 27 August 1372 (aged 66–67); Perugia
- Other name: Cardinal of Jerusalem
- Parent: father: Isnard de Cabassole
- Ordained: 1317
- Offices held: Bishop of Cavaillon; Cardinal Priest of Saints; Peter and Marcellinus; Cardinal Bishop of Sabina (1368-1372)
- Title: Canon of the cathedral chapter of Cavaillon

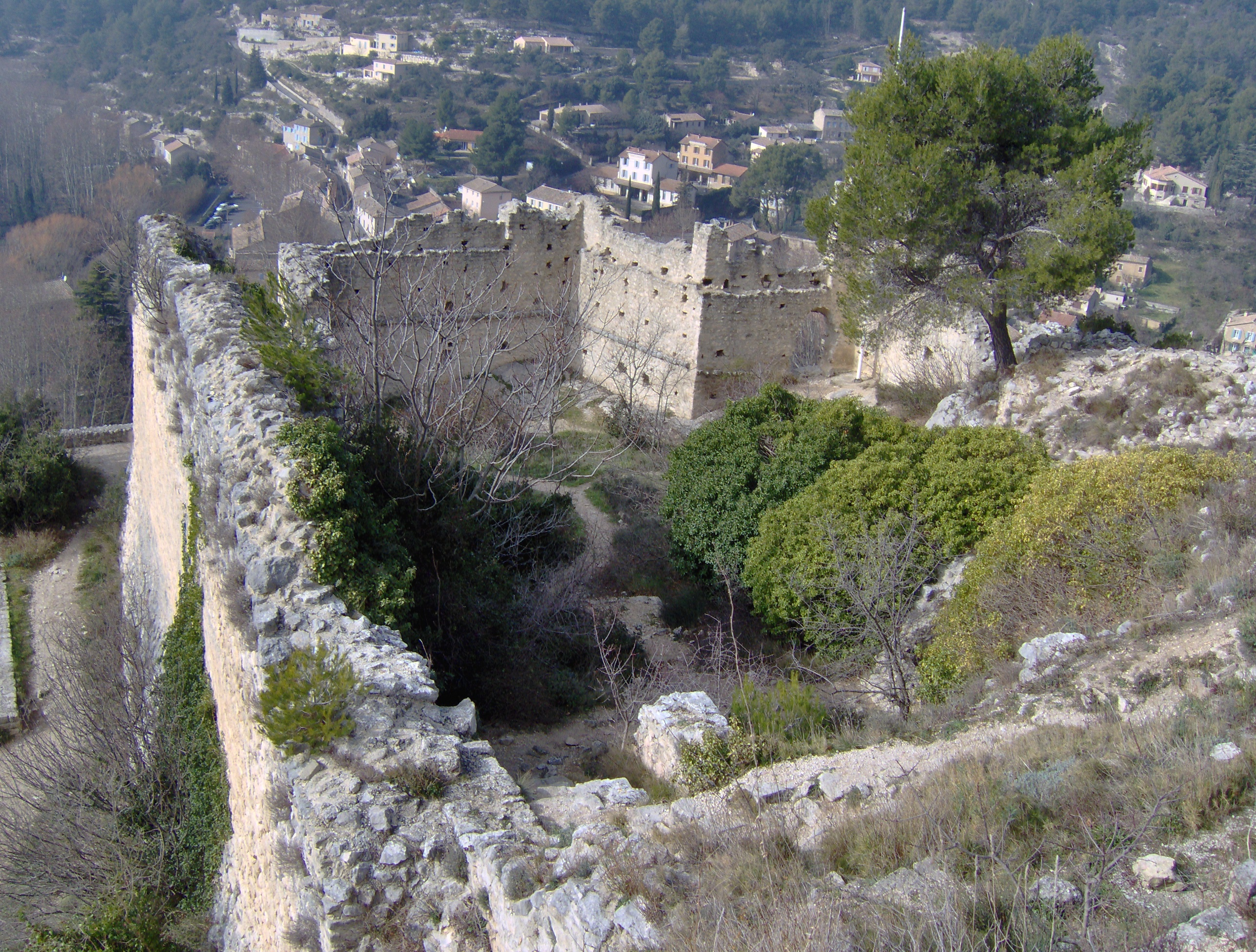
Philippe de Cabassole's castle ruins

Philippe de Cabassole or Philippe de Cabassoles (1305–1372), the Bishop of Cavaillon, Seigneur of Vaucluse, was the great protector of Renaissance poet Francesco Petrarch.

== Early life ==
Philippe was educated by the clergy of Cavaillon and was made Canon of the cathedral chapter of Cavaillon on 22 March 1328. He next was promoted to archdeacon on 26 August 1330. He then took a position as provost on 18 September 1331. Philippe was promoted to the episcopate when he was a deacon in 1333 by Pope John XXII.

== Middle life ==
Philip was elected bishop of Cavaillon on 17 August 1334. He attended the Council of Avignon in 1337. Philip became guardian of Robert of Anjou's granddaughter at his death, Queen Joan I of Naples. He became chancellor of Sicily in 1343 and legate of Pope Innocent VI in Dauphiné in 1353 and in Germany in 1358. He was named titular Latin patriarch of Jerusalem on 18 August 1361 and remained as administrator of the see of Cavaillon until 23 September 1366. He became rector of Comtat-Venaissin starting 17 November 1362. Philip was also named administrator of the see of Marseille on 23 September 1366 and was there until 9 December 1368. Philip created a cardinal priest of Santi Marcellino e Pietro al Laterano in the ecclesiastical council of 22 September 1368. He was made a cardinal by Pope Urban V in 1368 and entered the papal curia in Avignon on 4 June 1369. He was also named by Pope Urban V the governor of Avignon and vicar general during the pope's absence. He opted for the order of cardinal bishops and the suburbicarian see of Sabina on 31 May 1370 and also participated in the conclave of the same year to elect Pope Gregory XI. Gregory designated Philip papal legate of Tuscany, Campagna and Sabina. He was also Archdeacon of York and Archdeacon of Leicester from 1370 to 1372.

== Friendship with Petrarch ==
Philippe formed a long lasting friendship with Petrarch from 1337 until his death in 1372. Philippe had a villa not far from Avignon in the village of Vaucluse high on a cliff with a view. Petrarch built a home in Vaucluse after visiting his friend Philippe, who had built his castle on the site of a 7th-century BC Oppidum. From Philippe's castle the view was beautiful and is no wonder the bishop selected this lofty spot.

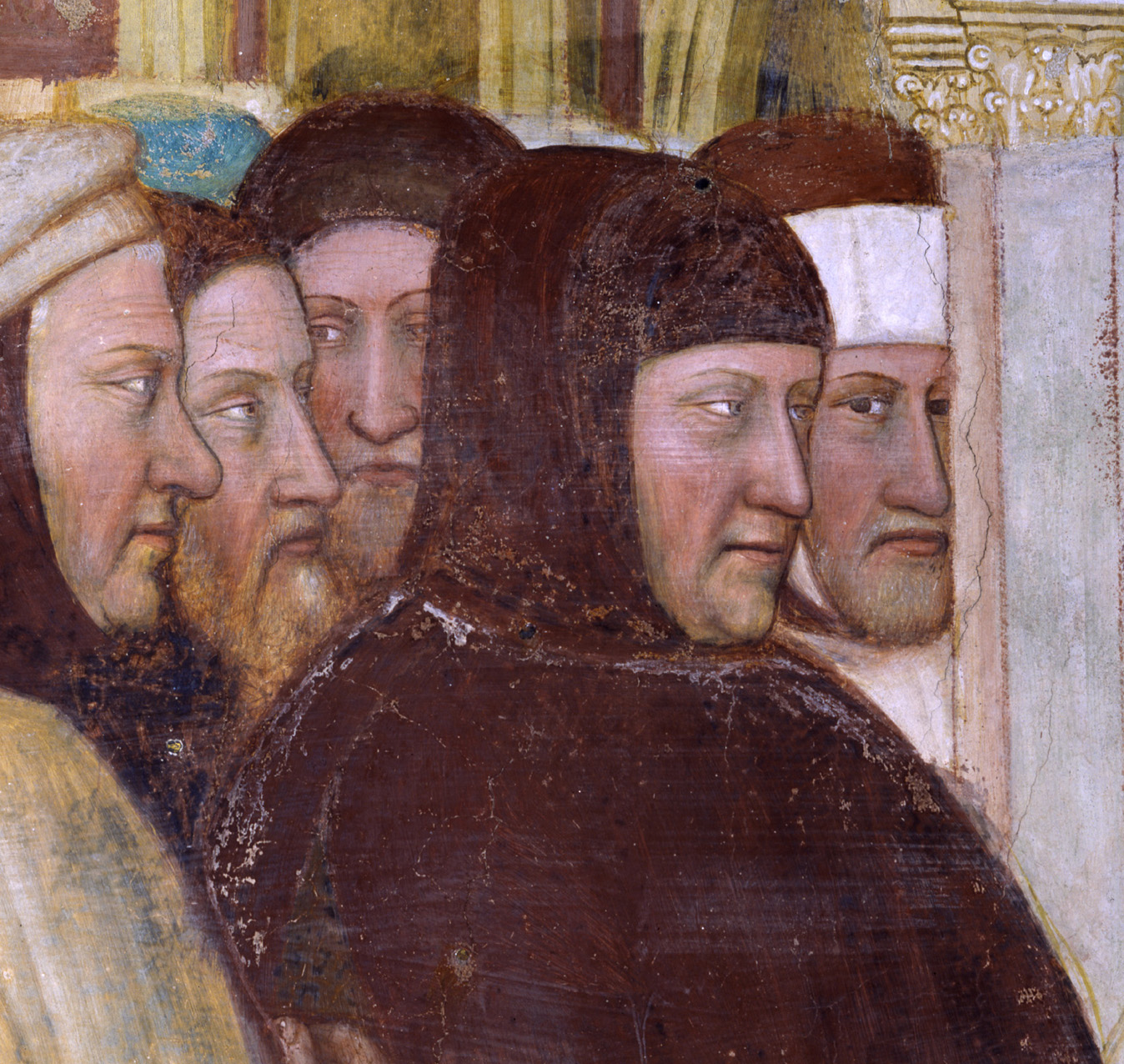
Portrait of Petrarch painted in 1376

Living just a short twenty-minute walk from one another, they developed a very close relationship that lasted a lifetime. Petrarch dedicated a book to his friend, who "treated him as a brother", despite his later status as Cardinal. Among the intimates of Petrarch's old age there seems to be only one name missing in Petrarch's will, which is Philippe's. Their friendship had begun in 1337 when Petrarch moved to Vaucluse. They stayed close friends up until Philippe's death in 1372. The fact that in spite of this undoubtedly very close relationship Petrarch did not include his friend Philippe in his Last Will and Testament is explained by the assumption that Petrarch could not think of any bequest suitable to a man of such high status as that of a prince.

Petrarch made a collection of 350 letters he personally wrote called Epistolae familiares (a.k.a. Familiar Letters). In among these letters in 1346 Petrarch writes what is called De vita solitaria, a treatise composed of two books and dedicated to Philippe de Cabassoles. In Book XXII of Familiar Letters is Petrarch's books of these letters to Philippe which he delivered 20 years after he wrote them. Also in addition to these books of letters he wrote some very special letters that he held out of the set of Epistolae familiares, which was later put into a set of 19 letters called Liber sine nomine. Letters 1 and 12 are letters Petrarch wrote to his friend Phillippe that are in this reserved set of letters "without a name" of the recipient. Petrarch dedicated his work De vita solitaria to his friend Philip. A dedication to him is in the preface.

Historian Wilkens tells of part of a letter Petrarch sent to Philip in 1371 that shows their friendship,

May God grant that I regain enough health and strength to make it possible for me to fulfill my heart's desire - a desire made still stronger by the news of your being here among us - my desire to see you once more. But in this, as in all else, God's will be done. If that desire is not to be fulfilled on earth, I shall see you again, God willing, in our heavenly fatherland. Oh may Christ the Lord not deny me this, that after my death I may no longer be separated from him who was so dear to me in this mortal life!

== Death and after ==
Pope Gregory XI sent Philippe to Perugia and designated him papal legate and governor of Umbria in early 1372. Before his term ended he died on 27 August 1372 and was buried in the Carthusian monastery of Bonpas, near Avignon. Later his body was transferred to the church of Caumont-sur-Durance in 1833. In October 1926, a commemorative plaque was placed de l'Evêché at Cavaillon in the ruins of his palace.

== Works ==
- Life of St. Mary Magdalene (Libellus hystorialis Marie beatissime Magedelene) - 1355.

== See also ==
- Avignon Papacy
