= Angelo Acciaioli (bishop) =

Italian Roman Catholic bishop

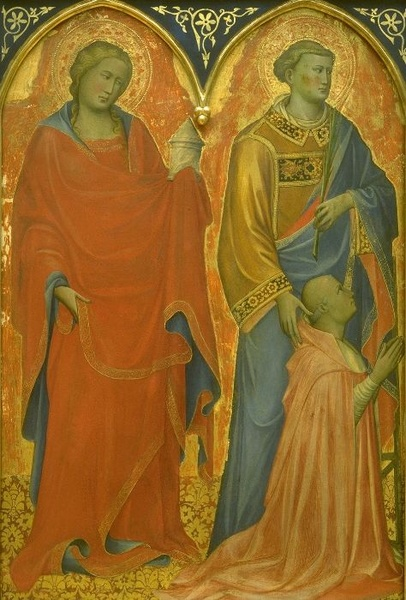
Angelo Acciaioli kneeling

Angelo Acciaioli (1298 – October 4, 1357) was an Italian Roman Catholic bishop from Florence.

Coat of arms of Angelo Acciaioli

Angelo was born in Florence of the noble Acciaioli family, the son of Monte, the grandson of Tommaso Acciaiuoli, also known as Mannino Acciaiuoli.

He entered the church and was bishop of Aquila from 1328 to 1342. From there he transferred back to Florence. He then became a Dominican friar, and was afterwards the bishop of Florence from 1342 to 1355, the successor to Francesco Silvestri. In 1355 he accepted the office of bishop of Monte Cassino in order to be closer to his new residence in Naples, where he lived for fourteen years..

At the beginning of his episcopate he was at the head of a group of plotters against the tyrannical Duke of Athens and dominated the city for a few years after his expulsion. He was head of the Balia Fourteen from July 1343. He was also a diplomat who was sent three times by the Florentine Republic as legate to the papal court at Avignon in 1344, 1348 and 1351. In 1345 he celebrated a diocesan synod, the oldest in Florence that has been documented. His successors in Florence were his brothers Francis Acciaiuoli, Martinaccio Acciaiuoli, Dardano, Alamanno, John, Bishop of Cesena, and Lina. By 1383 the see of Florence had passed to yet another family member, Angelo II Acciaioli

Despite residing in Florence he remained in contact with the officials in the Kingdom of Naples. In 1349 he was appointed Registrar and Chancellor of the kingdom by King Louis I and Queen Joan I. Also in 1349 under his leadership the Studio Fiorentino was initiated, the nucleus of the later University of Florence.

Angelo and his cousin Niccolò Acciaioli were the founders of the ambitious Florence Charterhouse at Galluzzo.

He died in Naples on October 4, 1357.

== Sources ==
- Archbishop Curia, 1970: The Florentine Church. Florence
- Litta, Pompeo: Acciaioli di Firenze, in Famiglie Celebri Italiane, 1830-45
- Setton, Kenneth M. (1975). Catalan Domination of Athens 1311–1380. London: Variorum.
- Ugurgieri della Berardenga, Curzio, 1962: Gli Acciaioli di Firenze nella Luce de' Loro Tempi. Leo Olschki
- Herbermann, Charles, ed. (1913). "Acciajuoli" . Catholic Encyclopedia. New York: Robert Appleton Company.
