= Papal supremacy =

Dogma that the Pope has supreme power over the whole Church

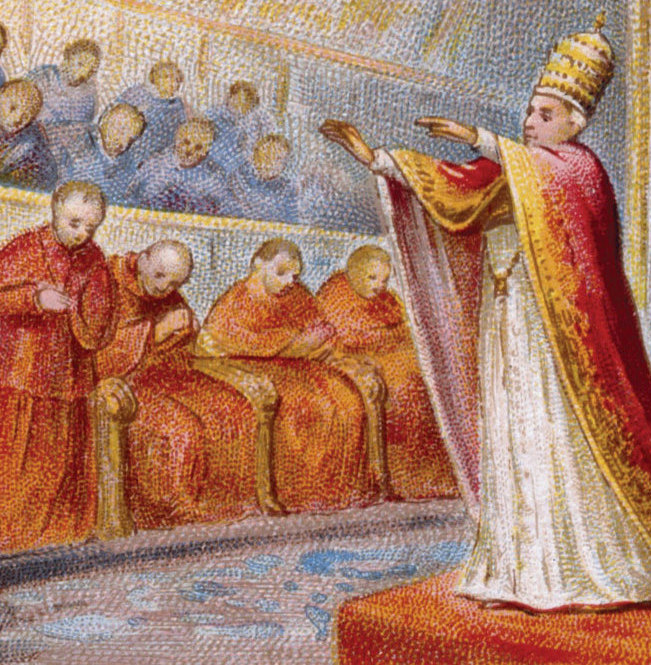
Pius IX opening the First Vatican Council. It is during this council that papal supremacy was proclaimed a dogma.

Papal supremacy is the dogma of the Catholic Church that the pope has full, supreme, immediate and universal power and authority over the whole Church. This is given by reason of his office as vicar of Christ, the visible source and foundation of the unity both of the bishops and of the whole company of the faithful, and as priest of the entire Catholic Church, and it is a power which he can always exercise unhindered.

The doctrine had the most significance in the relationship between the Church and the State in matters such as ecclesiastic privileges, the actions of monarchs, and even successions.

== Institution of papal supremacy ==
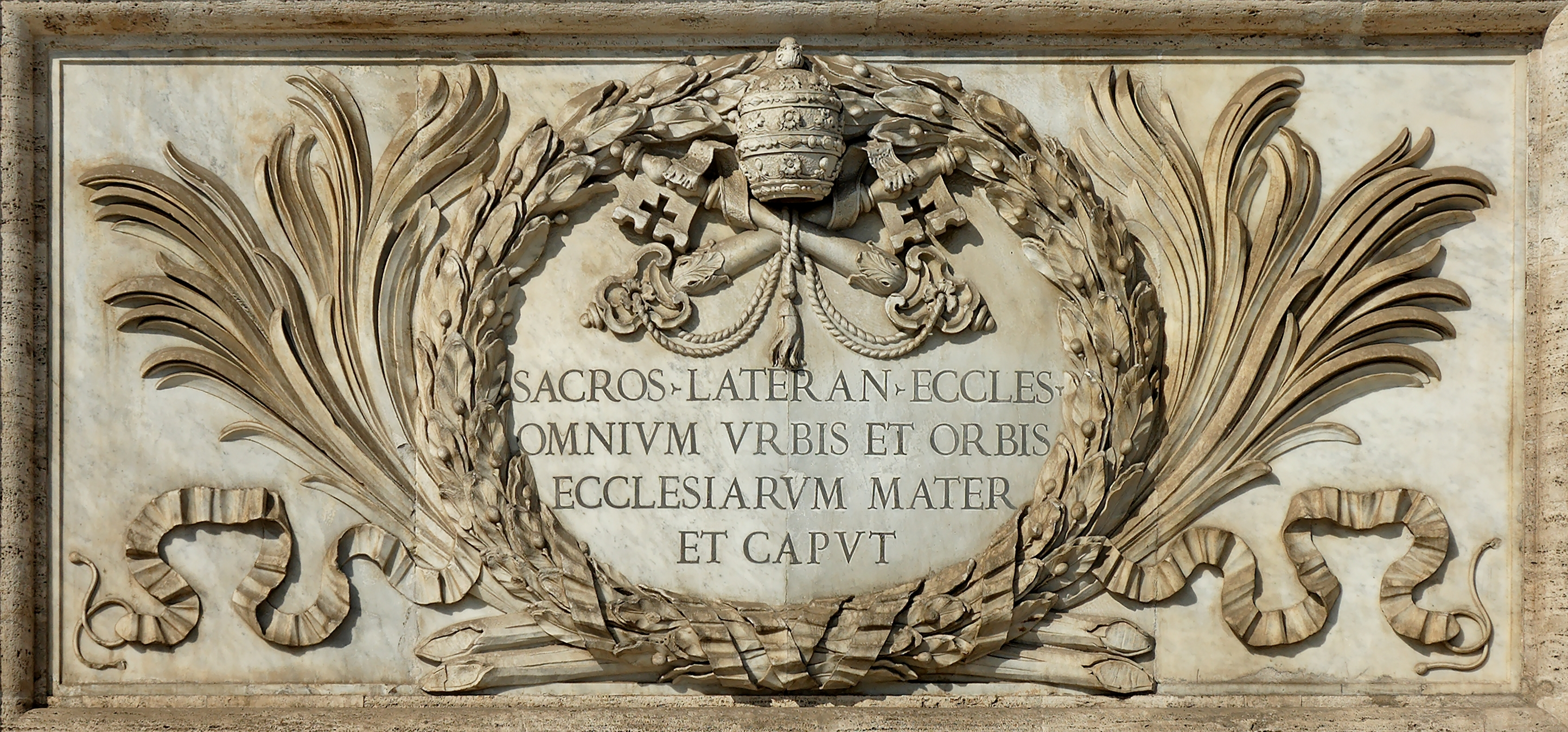
Inscription at front of Archbasilica of Saint John Lateran, cathedral church of the Bishop of Rome: Sacros(ancta) Lateran(ensis) eccles(ia) omnium urbis et orbis ecclesiarum mater et caput meaning "Most Holy Lateran Church, of all the churches in the city and the world, the Mother and Head"

The Catholic doctrine of papal supremacy is based on the idea that it was instituted by Christ and that papal succession is traced back to Peter the Apostle in the 1st century. The authority for the position is derived from the Confession of Peter documented in Matthew 16:17–19 when, in response to Peter's acknowledgment of Jesus as the Messiah and Son of God, which many relate to Jesus' divinity, Jesus responded:

Blessed are you, Simon son of Jonah, for this was not revealed to you by flesh and blood, but by my Father in heaven. And I tell you that you are Peter, and on this rock I will build my church, and the gates of Hades will not overcome it. I will give you the keys of the kingdom of heaven; whatever you bind on earth will be bound in heaven, and whatever you loose on earth will be loosed in heaven.

In his letter to Rome, Ignatius of Antioch says that the church at Rome "presides in the place of the region of the Romans" (προκάθηται ἐν τόπῳ χωρίου Ῥωμαίων).

Scholars such as Francis A. Sullivan say that there was no single "bishop" of Rome until well after the year 150 AD, and that there was no papacy for the first three centuries. Sullivan "expressed agreement with the consensus of scholars that available evidence indicates that the church of Rome was led by a college of presbyters, rather than a single bishop, for at least several decades of the second century."

Raymond E. Brown, while acknowledging the developmental aspect of bishoprics, did believe that early popes had high roles of authority among presbyters in Rome, and thus, it makes sense to speak of their successors.

Jesuit historian Klaus Schatz states that, "If one had asked a Christian in the year 100, 200, or even 300 whether the bishop of Rome was the head of all Christians, or whether there was a supreme bishop over all the other bishops and having the last word in questions affecting the whole Church, he or she would certainly have said no." He believes that this is because questions like these presuppose modern categories, which took time to develop. He goes on to explain how primacy was understood in the first centuries. He also believes it likely that "there very quickly emerged a presider or 'first among equals'".

In the first three centuries of Christianity the church in Rome intervened in other communities to help resolve conflicts. Pope Clement I did so in Corinth in the end of the first century. In the third century, Pope Cornelius convened and presided over a synod of 60 African and Eastern bishops, and his rival, the antipope Novatian, claimed to have "assumed the primacy".

In the complex development of papal supremacy, two broad phases may be noted.

=== First phase of papal supremacy ===
Irenaeus of Lyons believed in the second century that Peter and Paul had been the founders of the church in Rome and had appointed Linus as succeeding bishop.

From the beginning of his papacy in 401, Pope Innocent I was seen as the general arbitrator of ecclesiastical disputes in both the East and the West. During his papacy, the Roman apostolic See was seen as the ultimate resort for the settlement of all ecclesiastical disputes. His communications with Victricius of Rouen, Exuperius of Toulouse, Alexander of Antioch and others, as well as his actions on the appeal made to him by John Chrysostom against Theophilus of Alexandria, show that opportunities of this kind were numerous and varied.

Pope Leo I was a significant contributor to the centralisation of spiritual authority within the church and in reaffirming papal authority. The bishop of Rome had gradually become viewed as the chief patriarch in the Western church. On several occasions, Leo was asked to arbitrate disputes in Gaul. One involved Hilary of Arles, who refused to recognize Leo's judicial status. Leo appealed to past practice, "And so we would have you recollect, brethren, as we do, that the Apostolic See, such is the reverence in which it is held, has times out of number been referred to and consulted by the priests of your province as well as others, and in the various matters of appeal, as the old usage demanded, it has reversed or confirmed decisions: and in this way 'the unity of the spirit in the bond of peace Ephesians 4:3 has been kept'", Feeling that the primatial rights of the bishop of Rome were threatened, Leo appealed to the civil power for support and obtained, from Valentinian III, a decree of 6 June 445, which recognized the primacy of the bishop of Rome based on the merits of Peter, the dignity of the city, and the legislation of the First Council of Nicaea; and provided for the forcible extradition by provincial governors of any bishop who refused to answer a summons to Rome.

Gelasius I, who served from 492 to 496, in a controversy with Anastasius, the Byzantine emperor, likewise fought to maintain the doctrine of papal supremacy. This dispute was an incipient point of conflict between the Holy See and the Empire.

From the late 6th to the late 8th centuries there was a turning of the papacy to the West and its escape from subordination to the authority of the Byzantine emperors of Constantinople. This phase has sometimes incorrectly been credited to Pope Gregory I (who reigned from 590 to 604), who, like his predecessors, represented to the people of the Roman world a church that was still identified with the empire. Unlike some of those predecessors, Gregory was compelled to face the collapse of imperial authority in northern Italy. As the leading civil official of the empire in Rome, it fell to him to take over the civil administration of the cities and to negotiate for the protection of Rome itself with the Lombard invaders threatening it. Another part of this phase occurred in the 8th century, after the rise of the new religion of Islam had weakened the Byzantine Empire and the Lombards had renewed their pressure in Italy. The popes finally sought support from the Frankish rulers of the West and received from the Frankish king Pepin The Short the first part of the Italian territories later known as the Papal States. With Pope Leo III's coronation of Charlemagne, first of the Carolingian emperors, the papacy also gained his protection.

In letters concerning the Second Council of Nicea, the Roman Church is referred to as the "head of all churches" twice; at the same time it affirms Christ to be the head of the church, and the Apostle Peter is referred to as the "chief [of the] Apostles"—but when listed with Paul they are together referred to as the "chief apostles".

=== Second phase of papal supremacy ===
From the middle of the 11th century and extending to the middle of the 13th century was the second great phase in the process of papal supremacy's rise to prominence. It was first distinguished in 1075 by Gregory VII's bold attack on the traditional practices whereby the emperor had controlled appointments to the higher church offices. The attack spawned the protracted civil and ecclesiastical strife in Germany and Italy known as the Investiture Controversy. Secondly, it was distinguished in 1095 by Urban II's launching of the Crusades, which, in an attempt to liberate the Holy Land from Muslim domination, marshaled under papal leadership the aggressive energies of the European nobility. Both these efforts greatly enhanced papal prestige in the 12th and 13th centuries. Such powerful popes as Alexander III (r. 1159–81), Innocent III (r. 1198–1216), Gregory IX (r. 1227–1241), and Innocent IV (r. 1243–1254) wielded a primacy over the church that attempted to vindicate a jurisdictional supremacy over emperors and kings in temporal and spiritual affairs. As Matthew Edward Harris writes, "The overall impression gained is that the papacy was described in increasingly exalted terms as the thirteenth century progressed, although this development was neither disjunctive nor uniform, and was often in response to conflict, such as against Frederick II and Philip the Fair".

Early in this phase, defense of Papal supremacy was voiced by Anselm of Canterbury (1093–1109). Anselm insisted on his right and obligation to go to Rome to receive the pallium, symbolic of his metropolitan authority. King William Rufus refused to permit this as he had not as yet recognized Urban II as opposed to Clement III, who had been installed by Henry IV, Holy Roman Emperor. A council was held at Rockingham on 25 February 1095, where Anselm boldly asserted the authority of Urban in a speech giving testimony to the doctrine of papal supremacy.

=== Gallicanism ===
Gallicanism was a movement in the Kingdom of France to augment the rights of the State and to prejudice the rights of the Catholic Church in France.

An example of Gallicanism was the dispute between King Louis XIV of France and the Holy See about the application of the 1516 Concordat of Bologna after Louis XIV's extension of the droit de régale throughout the Kingdom of France in 1673. The dispute led to the 1682 Declaration of the Clergy of France promulgated by the 1681 Assembly of the French clergy. The Articles asserted that the civil power has absolute independence; that the pope is inferior to the General Council and the decrees of the Council of Constance were still binding; that the exercise of pontifical authority should be regulated by the ecclesiastical canons, and that dogmatic decisions of the pope are not irrevocable until they have been confirmed by the judgment of the whole church. The apostolic constitution Inter multiplices pastoralis officii promulgated by Pope Alexander VIII in 1690, and published in 1691, quashed the entire proceedings of the 1681 Assembly and declared that the Declaration of the clergy of France was null and void, and invalid. In 1693, Louis XIV rescinded the four articles and "wrote a letter of retraction" to Pope Innocent XII. Those members of the 1681 Assembly, who were presented as candidates for vacant episcopal sees and were refused papal confirmation of their appointment, received confirmation, in 1693, only after they disavowed everything that the 1681 Assembly decreed regarding ecclesiastical power and pontifical authority.

=== First Vatican Council ===
The doctrine of papal primacy was further developed in 1870 at the First Vatican Council.

In the dogmatic constitution named Pastor aeternus, ultramontanism achieved victory over conciliarism with the pronouncement of papal infallibility (the ability of the pope to define dogmas free from error ex cathedra) and of papal supremacy, i.e., supreme, full, immediate, and universal ordinary jurisdiction of the pope.

Indeed, Pastor aeternus states papal supremacy is a dogma:

according to the testimony of the Gospel, the primacy of jurisdiction over the universal Church of God was immediately and directly promised and given to blessed Peter the Apostle by Christ the Lord. [...] Whence, whosoever succeeds to Peter in this See, does by the institution of Christ himself obtain the Primacy of Peter over the whole Church. [...] The Roman Church possesses a superiority of ordinary power over all other churches, and that this power of jurisdiction of the Roman Pontiff, which is truly episcopal, is immediate; to which all, of whatever rite and dignity, both pastors and faithful, both individually and collectively, are bound, by their duty of hierarchical subordination and true obedience, to submit not only in matters which belong to faith and morals, but also in those that appertain to the discipline and government of the Church throughout the world, so that the Church of Christ may be one flock under one supreme pastor through the preservation of unity both of communion and of profession of the same faith with the Roman Pontiff. [...] And since by the divine right of Apostolic primacy the Roman Pontiff is placed over the universal Church, we further teach and declare that he is the supreme judge of the faithful, and that in all causes, the decision of which belongs to the Church, recourse may be had to his tribunal, and that none may re-open the judgment of the Apostolic See, than whose authority there is no greater, nor can any lawfully review its judgment. Wherefore they err from the right course who assert that it is lawful to appeal from the judgments of the Roman Pontiffs to an œcumenical Council, as to an authority higher than that of the Roman Pontiff.

— Vatican I, Pastor Aeternus, ch. I, III

=== Second Vatican Council ===
At the Second Vatican Council (1962–1965) the debate on papal primacy and authority re-emerged, and in the dogmatic constitution Lumen gentium, the Catholic Church's teaching on the authority of the pope, bishops and councils was further elaborated. Vatican II sought to clarify the ecclesiology stated in Vatican I. The result is the body of teaching about the papacy and episcopacy contained in Lumen gentium.

Vatican II reaffirmed everything Vatican I taught about papal primacy, supremacy and infallibility, but it added important points about bishops. Bishops, it says, are not "vicars of the Roman Pontiff". Rather, in governing their local churches they are "vicars and legates of Christ". Together, they form a body, a "college", whose head is the pope. This episcopal college is responsible for the well-being of the Catholic Church. Here in a nutshell are the basic elements of the Council's much-discussed communio ecclesiology, which affirms the importance of local churches and the doctrine of collegiality.

In a passage about collegiality, Vatican II teaches: "The order of bishops is the successor to the college of the apostles in their role as teachers and pastors, and in it the apostolic college is perpetuated. Together with their head, the Supreme Pontiff, and never apart from him, they have supreme and full authority over the Universal Church; but this power cannot be exercised without the agreement of the Roman Pontiff". Much of the present discussion of papal primacy is concerned with exploring the implications of this passage.

Vatican II also emphasized the sensus fidelium as the vehicle for the living tradition, with the promise to Peter assuring that the gates of Hades will not prevail against the church, which is the people who are the living tradition. Therefore, infallibility is "a doctrine and order rooted in and reflecting the sensus fidelium". Rahner insists that a Pope's statements depend essentially on his knowledge of what the living tradition maintains. There is no question of revelation but of preservation from error in the exercise of this oversight. This living tradition was gathered from communication with all the Bishops in the two instances where the Pope defined dogmas apart from a Council, the Immaculate Conception and the Assumption.

== Opposition ==
=== Early Church ===
Ignatius of Antioch claimed that there was no ecclesiastical authority above that of the local Bishop.

Tertullian, noted for his contributions for the doctrine of the Trinity, explicitly rejected papal supremacy in his treatise De Pudicitia; his views on the matter were influenced by his adherence to Montanism.

The Dictatus papae, which some attributed to Pope Saint Gregory VII (11th century), states that "the Roman pontiff alone can with right be called universal". The popes have not on the basis of this right employed the title "universal bishop". Pope Saint Gregory I (6th century) condemned the use of this expression by the patriarch of Constantinople of this title, and said that whoever claims it "is, in his elation, the precursor of Antichrist" possibly referring to whoever is made Patriarch of the other 4 Sees. According to John Norman Davidson Kelly, Gregory I was not in any way denying the universal jurisdiction of the bishop of Rome; to Kelly, Gregory I "was indefatigable ... in upholding the Roman primacy, and successfully maintained Rome's appellate jurisdiction in the east. ... Gregory argued that St. Peter's commission [e.g. in Matthew 16:18f] made all churches, Constantinople included, subject to Rome". In 1998, the Congregation for the Doctrine of the Faith explained that while every bishop is a subject of the sollicitudo omnium Ecclesiarum (in ref. to 2 Co 11:28), "In the case of the Bishop of Rome - Vicar of Christ in the way proper to Peter as Head of the College of Bishops - the sollicitudo omnium Ecclesiarum acquires particular force because it is combined with the full and supreme power in the Church: a truly episcopal power, not only supreme, full and universal, but also immediate, over all pastors and other faithful." Gregory I himself, though he asserted the reality of the primacy of the bishop of his apostolic see, the bishop who carried on the work entrusted to Peter, rejected use of the title "universal bishop", which he called "profane".

=== Protestant ===
Protestant opposition to papal supremacy can be traced back to the Protestant Reformation. Early Reformers such as Martin Luther, Philip Melanchthon, and John Calvin were highly critical of papal authority and saw it contrary to the teachings of scripture. Luther went as far as to regard the pope as the Antichrist as found in the Bible.

=== Eastern Orthodox ===
Catholic Cardinal and theologian Yves Congar wrote:

The East never accepted the regular jurisdiction of Rome, nor did it submit to the judgment of Western bishops. Its appeals to Rome for help were not connected with a recognition of the principle of Roman jurisdiction but were based on the view that Rome had the same truth, the same good. The East jealously protected its autonomous way of life. Rome intervened to safeguard the observation of legal rules, to maintain the orthodoxy of faith and to ensure communion between the two parts of the church, the Roman see representing and personifying the West [...]. In according Rome a 'primacy of honour', the East avoided basing this primacy on the succession and the still living presence of the apostle Peter. A modus vivendi was achieved which lasted, albeit with crises, down to the middle of the eleventh century.

Referring to Ignatius of Antioch's "Let Nothing Be Done Without the Bishop" in his Letter to the Smyrnaeans, Carlton wrote:

Contrary to popular opinion, the word catholic does not mean "universal"; it means "whole, complete, lacking nothing." [...] Thus, to confess the Church to be catholic is to say that She possesses the fullness of the Christian faith. To say, however, that [Eastern] Orthodox and Rome constitute two lungs of the same Church is to deny that either Church separately is catholic in any meaningful sense of the term. This is not only contrary to the teaching of [Eastern] Orthodoxy, it is flatly contrary to the teaching of the Catholic Church, which considered itself truly catholic.

The church is in the image of the Trinity and reflects the reality of the incarnation, which implies that:

"The body of Christ must always be equal with itself [...].The local church which manifests the body of Christ cannot be subsumed into any larger organisation or collectivity which makes it more catholic and more in unity, for the simple reason that the principle of total catholicity and total unity is already intrinsic to it."

== See also ==
- Caesaropapism
- Conclave capitulation
- Constantinianism
- Donation of Constantine
- Eastern Orthodox opposition to papal supremacy
- Papal infallibility
- Papal primacy
