= Gallicanism =

Rejection of ultramontanism

Gallicanism is the belief that popular secular authority—often represented by the monarch's or the state's authority—over the Catholic Church is comparable to that of the pope. Gallicanism may be contrasted with ultramontanism. Gallicanism shares some similarities with the ecclesiology of Anglicanism, but while it plays down the authority of the pope in church, it generally does not deny that there are some authoritative elements to the papal office as primus inter pares ('first among equals'). Other terms for the same or similar doctrines include Erastianism, Regalism, Febronianism, and Josephinism.

Gallicanism originated in France (the term derives from Gallia, the Latin name of Gaul), and is unrelated to the first-millennium Catholic Gallican Rite. In the 18th century, it spread to the Low Countries, especially the Netherlands. The University of Notre Dame professor John McGreevy defines it as "the notion that national customs might trump Roman (Catholic Church) regulations."

== Background ==
Gallicanism is a group of religious opinions that was for some time peculiar to the Catholic Church in France. These opinions were in opposition to the ideas which were called ultramontane, which means "across the mountains" (the Alps). Ultramontanism affirmed the authority of the pope over the temporal kingdoms of the rest of Europe, particularly emphasizing a supreme episcopate for the pope holding universal immediate jurisdiction. This eventually led to the definition by the Roman Catholic Church of the dogma of papal infallibility at the First Vatican Council.

Gallicanism tended to restrain the pope's authority in favour of that of bishops and the people's representatives in the State, or the monarch. But the most respected proponents of Gallican ideas did not contest the pope's primacy in the Church, merely his supremacy and doctrinal infallibility. They believed their way of regarding the authority of the pope—more in line with that of the Conciliar movement and akin to the Orthodox and Anglicans—was more in conformity with Holy Scripture and tradition. At the same time, they believed their theory did not transgress the limits of free opinions.

== General notions ==
The Declaration of the Clergy of France of 1682 is made up of four articles:

1. St. Peter and the popes, his successors, and the Church itself have dominion from God only over things spiritual and not over things temporal and civil. Therefore, kings and sovereigns are not beholden to the church in deciding temporal things. They cannot be deposed by the church and their subjects cannot be absolved by the church from their oaths of allegiance.
2. The authority in things spiritual belongs to the Holy See and the successors of St. Peter, and does not affect the decrees of the Council of Constance contained in the fourth and fifth sessions of that council, which is observed by the Gallican Church. The Gallicans do not approve of casting slurs on those decrees.
3. The exercise of this Apostolic authority (puissance) must be regulated in accordance with canons (rules) established by the Holy Spirit through the centuries of Church history.
4. Although the pope has the chief part in questions of faith, and his decrees apply to all the Churches, and to each Church in particular, yet his judgment is not irreformable, at least pending the consent of the Church.

According to the initial Gallican theory, then, papal primacy was limited first by the temporal power of monarchs, which, by divine will, was inviolable. Secondly, it was limited by the authority of the general councils and the bishops, and lastly by the canons and customs of particular churches, which the pope was bound to take into account when he exercised his authority.

Gallicanism was more than pure theory – the bishops and magistrates of France used it, the former to increase power in the government of dioceses, the latter to extend their jurisdiction so as to cover ecclesiastical affairs. There also was an episcopal and political Gallicanism, and a parliamentary or judicial Gallicanism. The former lessened the doctrinal authority of the pope in favour of that of the bishops, to the degree marked by the Declaration of 1682, and the latter augmented the rights of the state.

There were eighty-three "Liberties of the Gallican Church", according to a collection drawn up by the jurisconsults Guy Coquille and Pierre Pithou. Besides the four articles cited above, which were incorporated, these Liberties included the following:

- The Kings of France had the right to assemble councils in their dominions, and to make laws and regulations touching ecclesiastical matters.
- The pope's legates could not be sent into France, or exercise their power within that kingdom, except at the king's request or with his consent.
- Bishops, even when commanded by the pope, could not go out of the kingdom without the king's consent.
- Royal officers could not be excommunicated for any act performed in the discharge of their official duties.
- The pope could not authorize the alienation of any landed estate of the Churches, or the diminishing of any foundations.
- His bulls and letters might not be executed without the pareatis of the king or his officers.
- He could not issue dispensations to the prejudice of the laudable customs and statutes of the cathedral Churches.
- It was lawful to appeal from him to a future council, or to have recourse to the "appeal as from an abuse" against acts of the ecclesiastical power.

Parliamentary Gallicanism, therefore, was of much wider scope than episcopal; indeed, it was often disavowed by the bishops of France, and about twenty of them condemned Pierre Pithou's book when a new edition of it was published, in 1638, by the brothers Dupuy.

== History ==
John Kilcullen wrote, in the Stanford Encyclopedia of Philosophy, that "in France conciliarism was one of the sources of Gallicanism."

Proponents of Gallicanism presented a number of theories as to its origin.

- The more moderate held that Gallican ideas and liberties were simply privileges – concessions made by the popes, who had been quite willing to divest themselves of a part of their authority in favour of the bishops or kings of France. Thus the extension of the king's authority ecclesiastical matters was not new. This idea appeared as early as the reign of King Philip IV, in some of the protests of that monarch against the policy of Pope Boniface VIII. In the view of some partisans of the theory, the popes had always thought fit to show special consideration for the ancient customs of the Gallican Church, which in every age had distinguished itself by its exactitude in the preservation of the Faith and the maintenance of ecclesiastical discipline.
- Others dated the Gallican approach to the time of the early Carolingians, and explaining them somewhat differently, when the popes found it necessary to delegate certain prerogatives to the king in order that some control be exerted on the Frankish nobles who had taken possession of episcopal sees. The popes had, therefore, granted to Carloman, Pepin, and Charlemagne a spiritual authority which they were to exercise only under papal control; which authority had been inherited by their successors, the Kings of France.

The majority of Gallicans rejected the first theory that described the Gallican liberties as time-honored privileges, since a privilege can always be revoked by the authority which granted it. This was unacceptable, as they maintained that the pope had no power to revoke them. The Ultramontanes pointed out that in that case, such liberties would also be claimed by the German emperors, also heirs of Charlemagne, and that was not the case. Moreover, some privileges the pope cannot grant, such as allowing any kings the privilege of suppressing or curtailing his liberty of communicating with the faithful in a particular territory.

Most of its partisans regarded Gallicanism as a revival of the most ancient traditions of Christianity, found in the conciliar decrees of the earliest centuries or in canon laws of the general and local councils, and the decretals, ancient and modern, which were received in France. "Of all Christian countries", says Fleury, "France has been the most careful to conserve the liberty of her Church and oppose the novelties introduced by Ultramontane canonists". They argued that the popes had extended to their own primacy based upon the false Decretals rather than Divine law. What the Gallicans maintained in 1682 was said to be not a collection of novelties, but a body of beliefs as old as the Church, the discipline of the first centuries. The Church of France had upheld and practised them at all times; the Church Universal had believed and practised them in the past, until about the tenth century; St. Louis had supported, but not created, them by the Pragmatic Sanction; the Council of Constance had taught them with the pope's approbation. Gallican ideas, then, must have had no other origin than that of Christian dogma and ecclesiastical discipline.

=== The early Middle Ages ===
To the similarity of the historical vicissitudes through which they passed, their common political allegiance, and the early appearance of a national sentiment, the Churches of France owed it that they very soon formed an individual, compact, and homogeneous body. From the end of the fourth century the popes themselves recognized this solidarity. It was to the "Gallican" bishops that Pope Damasus I addressed the most ancient decretal which has been preserved to our times (Babut 1904). Two centuries later St. Gregory the Great pointed out the Gallican Church to his envoy Augustine, the Apostle of England, as one of those whose customs he might accept as of equal stability with those of the Roman Church or of any other whatsoever. But already (if we credit Babut's findings) a Council of Turin, at which bishops of the Gauls took part, had given the first manifestation of Gallican sentiment. Unfortunately for Babut's thesis, all the significance which he attaches to this council depends upon the date, 417, ascribed to it by him, on the mere strength of a personal conjecture, in opposition to the most competent historians. Besides, it is not at all plain how a council of the Province of Milan is to be taken as representing the ideas of the Gallican Church.

In truth, that Church, during the Merovingian period, testifies the same deference to the Holy See as do all the others. Ordinary questions of discipline are in the ordinary course settled in councils, often held with the assent of the kings, but on great occasions – the Council of Epaone (517),Valence (528), Vaison (529), Orléans (538), Tours (567) – the bishops declare that they are acting under the impulse of the Holy See, or defer to its admonitions; they take pride in the approbation of the pope; they cause his name to be read aloud in the churches, just as is done in Italy and in Africa they cite his decretals as a source of canon law; they show indignation at the mere idea that anyone should fail in consideration for them. Bishops condemned in councils (like Salonius of Embrun, Sagittarius of Gap, Contumeliosus of Riez) have no difficulty in appealing to the pope, who, after examination, either confirms or rectifies the sentence pronounced against them.

=== From Pepin to the Reformation ===
The accession of the Carolingian dynasty is marked by a splendid act of homage paid in France to the power of the papacy: before assuming the title of king, Pepin made the point of securing the assent of Pope Zachary. Without exaggerating the significance of this act, the bearing of which the Gallicans have done every thing to minimize, one may still see it as evidence that, even before Gregory VII, public opinion in France was not hostile to the intervention of the pope in political affairs. From that time on, the advances of the Roman primacy find no serious opponents in France before Hincmar, Archbishop of Reims. With him there appears the idea that the pope must limit his activity to ecclesiastical matters, and not intrude in those pertaining to the State, which concern kings only; that his supremacy is bound to respect the prescriptions of the ancient canons and the privileges of the Churches; and that his decretals must not be placed upon the same footing as the canons of the councils. His attitude stands out as isolated. The Council of Troyes (867) proclaims that no bishop can be deposed without reference to the Holy See, and the Council of Douzy (871) condemns Hincmar of Laon only under reserve of the rights of the pope.

With the first Capets the secular relations between the pope and the Gallican Church appeared to be momentarily strained. At the Councils of Saint-Basle de Verzy (991) and of Chelles (c. 993), in the discourses of Arnoul, Bishop of Orléans, in the letters of Gerbert, afterwards Pope Sylvester II, sentiments of violent hostility to the Holy See are manifested, and an evident determination to elude the authority in matters of discipline which had until then been recognized as belonging to it. But the papacy at that period, given over to the tyranny of Crescentius and other local barons, was in a period of temporary decline. When it regained its independence, its old authority in France came back to it, the work of the Councils of Saint-Basle and of Chelles was undone; princes like Hugh Capet, bishops like Gerbert, held no attitude but that of submission. It has been said that during the early Capetian period the pope was more powerful in France than he had ever been. Under Gregory VII the pope's legates traversed France from north to south, they convoked and presided over numerous councils, and, in spite of sporadic and incoherent acts of resistance, they deposed bishops and excommunicated princes just as in Germany and Spain.

In the following two centuries we can still see no clear evidence of Gallicanism. The pontifical power attains its apogee in France as elsewhere, St. Bernard and St. Thomas Aquinas outline the theory of that power, and their opinion is that of the school in accepting the attitude of Gregory VII and his successors in regard to delinquent princes. St. Louis IX, whom some tried to represent as a patron of the Gallican system, is still ignorant of it – for the fact is now established that the Pragmatic Sanction of 1269, long attributed to him, was a wholesale fabrication put together (about 1445) in the purlieus of the Royal Chancellery of Charles VII to lend countenance to the Pragmatic Sanction of Bourges. (Löffler 1911)

At the opening of the fourteenth century, however, the conflict between Philip IV and Boniface VIII brought out the first glimmerings of the Gallican ideas. That king did not confine himself to maintaining that, as sovereign, he was the sole and independent master of his temporalities; he proclaimed that, in virtue of the concession made by the pope, with the assent of a general council to Charlemagne and his successors, he had the right to dispose of vacant ecclesiastical benefices. With the consent of the nobility, the Third Estate, and a great part of the clergy, he appealed in the matter from Boniface VIII to a future general council – the implication being that the council is superior to the pope. The same ideas and others still more hostile to the Holy See reappeared in the struggle of Fratricelles and Louis of Bavaria against Pope John XXII; they were expressed by the pens of William of Occam, of John of Jandun, and of Marsilius of Padua, professors in the University of Paris. Among other things, they denied the divine origin of the papal primacy, and subject the exercise of it to the good pleasure of the temporal ruler. Following the pope, the University of Paris condemned these views; but for all that they did not entirely disappear from the memory, or from the disputations, of the schools, for the principal work of Marsilius, Defensor Pacis, was translated into French in 1375, probably by a professor of the University of Paris. The Western Schism reawakened them suddenly.

The idea of a council naturally suggested itself as a means of healing that unfortunate division of Christendom. Upon that idea was soon grafted the conciliary theory, which sets the council above the pope, making it the sole representative of the Church, the sole organ of infallibility. Timidly sketched by two professors of the University of Paris, Conrad of Gelnhausen and Henry of Langenstein, this theory was completed and noisily interpreted to the public by Pierre d'Ailly and Gerson. At the same time the clergy of France, disgusted with Benedict XIII, withdrew from his obedience. It was in the assembly which voted on this measure (1398) that for the first time there was any question of bringing back the Church of France to its ancient liberties and customs – of giving its prelates once more the right of conferring and disposing of benefices. The same idea comes into the foreground in the claims put forward in 1406 by another assembly of the French clergy; to win the votes of the assembly, certain orators cited the example of what was happening in England. Johannes Haller concluded from this that these so-called Ancient Liberties were of English origin, that the Gallican Church really borrowed them from its neighbour, only imagining them to be a revival of its own past. This opinion does not seem well founded. The precedents cited by Haller go back to the parliament held at Carlisle in 1307, at which date the tendencies of reaction against papal reservations had already manifested themselves in the assemblies convoked by Philip the Fair in 1302 and 1303. The most that we can admit is, that the same ideas received parallel development from both sides of the channel.

Together with the restoration of the "Ancient Liberties" the assembly of the clergy in 1406 intended to maintain the superiority of the council to the pope, and the fallibility of the latter. However widely they may have been accepted at the time, these were only individual opinions or opinions of a school, when the Council of Constance came to give them the sanction of its high authority. In its fourth and fifth sessions it declared that the council represented the Church and that every person, no matter of what dignity, even the pope, was bound to obey it in what concerned the extirpation of the schism and the reform of the Church; that even the pope, if he resisted obstinately, might be constrained by process of law to obey it in the above-mentioned points. This was the birth or, if we prefer to call it so, the legitimation of Gallicanism. So far we had encountered in the history of the Gallican Church recriminations of malcontent bishops, or a violent gesture of some prince discomforted in his avaricious designs; but these were only fits of resentment or ill humor, accidents with no attendant consequences; this time the provisions made against exercise of the pontifical authority had a lasting effect. Gallicanism had implanted itself in the minds of men as a national doctrine and it only remained to apply it in practice. This is to be the work of the Pragmatic Sanction of Bourges. In that instrument the clergy of France inserted the articles of Constance repeated at Basle, and upon that warrant assumed authority to regulate the collation of benefices and the temporal administration of the Churches on the sole basis of the common law, under the king's patronage, and independently of the pope's action. From Eugene IV to Leo X the popes did not cease to protest against the Pragmatic Sanction, until it was replaced by the Concordat of Bologna in 1516. But, if its provisions disappeared from the laws of France, the principles it embodied for a time nonetheless continued to inspire the schools of theology and parliamentary jurisprudence. Those principles even appeared at the Council of Trent, where the ambassadors, theologians, and bishops of France repeatedly championed them, notably when the council discussed whether episcopal jurisdiction comes immediately from God or through the pope, whether or not the council ought to ask confirmation of its decrees from the sovereign pontiff, etc. Then again, it was in the name of the Liberties of the Gallican Church that a part of the clergy and the Parlementaires opposed the publication of the Council of Trent; and the crown decided to detach from it and publish what seemed good, in the form of ordinances emanating from the royal authority.

=== After the Reformation ===
The assassination of Henry IV, which was exploited to move public opinion against Ultramontanism and the activity of Edmond Richer, syndic of the Sorbonne, brought about, at the beginning of the seventeenth century, a revival of Gallicanism. In 1663 the Sorbonne declared that it admitted no authority of the pope over the king's temporal dominion, nor his superiority to a general council, nor infallibility apart from the Church's consent.

In 1682, Louis XIV having decided to extend to all the Churches of his kingdom the droit de regale, or right of receiving the revenue of vacant sees, and of conferring the sees themselves at his pleasure, Pope Innocent XI opposed the king's designs. The king assembled the clergy of France and, on 19 March 1682, the thirty-six prelates and thirty-four deputies of the second order who constituted that assembly adopted the four articles summarized above and transmitted them to all the other bishops and archbishops of France. Three days later the king commanded the registration of the articles in all the schools and faculties of theology; no one could be admitted to degrees in theology without having maintained this doctrine in one of his theses and it was forbidden to write anything against them. Pope Innocent XI issued the Rescript of 11 April 1682, in which he voided and annulled all that the assembly had done in regard to the regale; he also refused Bulls to all members of the assembly who were proposed for vacant bishoprics.

In the same way Alexander VIII, by a Constitution dated 4 August 1690, quashed as detrimental to the Holy See the proceedings both in the matter of the regale and in that of the declaration on the ecclesiastical power and jurisdiction, which had been prejudicial to the clerical estate and order. The bishops designate to whom Bulls had been refused received them at length, in 1693, only after addressing to Pope Innocent XII a letter in which they disavowed everything that had been decreed in that assembly in regard to the ecclesiastical power and the pontifical authority. The king himself wrote to the pope (14 September 1693) to announce that a royal order had been issued against the execution of the edict of 23 March 1682.

In spite of these disavowals, the Declaration of 1682 remained thenceforward the living symbol of Gallicanism, professed by the great majority of the French clergy, obligatorily defended in the faculties of theology, schools, and seminaries, guarded from the lukewarmness of French theologians and the attacks of foreigners by the inquisitorial vigilance of the French parliaments, which never failed to condemn to suppression every work that seemed hostile to the principles of the Declaration.

From France Gallicanism spread, about the middle of the eighteenth century, into the Low Countries, thanks to the works of the jurisconsult Zeger Bernhard van Espen. Under the pseudonym of Febronius, Hontheim introduced it into Germany where it took the forms of Febronianism and Josephism. The Synod of Pistoia (1786) even tried to acclimatize it in Italy. But its diffusion was sharply arrested by the French Revolution, which took away its chief support by overturning the thrones of kings. Against the Revolution that drove them out and wrecked their sees, nothing was left to the bishops of France but to link themselves closely with the Holy See. After the Concordat of 1801 French Governments made some pretence of reviving, in the Organic Articles, the "Ancient Gallican Liberties" and the obligation of teaching the articles of 1682, but ecclesiastical Gallicanism was never again resuscitated except in the form of a vague mistrust of Rome. On the fall of Napoleon and the Bourbons, the work of Lamennais, of "L'Avenir" and other publications devoted to Roman ideas, the influence of Prosper Guéranger, and the effects of religious teaching ever increasingly deprived it of its partisans.

When the First Vatican Council opened, in 1869, it had in France only timid defenders. When that council declared that the pope has in the Church the plenitude of jurisdiction in matters of faith, morals discipline, and in administration, that his decisions ex cathedra are of themselves, and without the assent of the Church, infallible and irreformable, it dealt Gallicanism a fatal blow. Three of the four articles were directly condemned. As to the remaining one, the first, the council made no specific declaration; but an important indication of the Catholic doctrine was given in the condemnation fulminated by Pope Pius IX against the 24th proposition of the Syllabus of Errors, in which it was asserted that the Church cannot have recourse to force and is without any temporal authority, direct or indirect. Pope Leo XIII shed more direct light upon the question in his Encyclical Immortale Dei (12 November 1885), where we read: "God has apportioned the government of the human race between two powers, the ecclesiastical and the civil, the former set over things divine, the latter over things human. Each is restricted within limits which are perfectly determined and defined in conformity with its own nature and special aim. There is therefore, as it were a circumscribed sphere in which each exercises its functions jure proprio". And in the Encyclical Sapientiae Christianae (10 January 1890), the same pontiff adds: "The Church and the State have each its own power, and neither of the two powers is subject to the other."

== See also ==
- Caesaropapism
- Catholicism in France
- Civil Constitution of the Clergy
- Donation of Constantine
- Erastianism
- Febronianism
- Église gallicane, 'Gallican Church'
- Interdict (Catholic canon law)
- Josephinism
- Papal supremacy
- Patronato real
- Political Catholicism
- Regalism
- Syllabus of Errors
- Symphonia (theology)
- Temporal power (papal)
- Two kingdoms doctrine
- Ultramontanism
- Anticurialism

== Sources ==
- Website of the Gallican Church (l'Eglise Gallicane )
- P. Babut, "La plus ancienne décrétale", Paris, 1904 (in French, referenced implicitly by the Catholic Encyclopedia article).
- Cardinal Giovanni Battista De Luca: Nepotism in the Seventeenth-century Catholic Church and De Luca's Efforts to Prohibit the Practice
- Rothrock, George A. "The French Crown and the Estates General of 1614". French Historical Studies, vol. 1, no. 3, 1960, pp. 295–318. JSTOR, www.jstor.org/stable/285971.
- Thompson, D. (1986). General Ricci and the Suppression of the Jesuit Order in France 1760–4. The Journal of Ecclesiastical History, 37(3), 426–441. doi:10.1017/S0022046900021485
