= Declaration of the Clergy of France =

Declaration of the clergy of France
- Created: March 19, 1682
- Author(s): Charles Maurice Le Tellier, archbishop of Reims; Gilbert de Choiseul Duplessis Praslin, bishop of Tournai; and Jacques-Bénigne Bossuet, bishop of Meaux
- Signatories: 1681 Assembly of the French clergy

The Declaration of the Clergy of France was a four-article document of the 1681 assembly of the French clergy. Promulgated in 1682, it codified the principles of Gallicanism into a system for the first time into an official and definitive formula.

== Background ==
The 1516 Concordat of Bologna between the Holy See and the Kingdom of France repealed and explicitly superseded the 1438 Pragmatic Sanction of Bourges and was confirmed by the contemporaneous Fifth Lateran Council. The concordat was registered by the Parlements in 1518 and defined, according to Roger Aubenas, in The New Cambridge Modern History, "a logical division of prerogatives, but one which involved discontinuance of elections". Under the terms of the concordat, the election of bishops by canons and abbots by monks was discontinued; the right of presentation of a candidate for appointment as a bishop, abbot, or prior was conceded to the king and the right of confirmation of a candidate, right of devolution, (Note: The right to appoint a candidate of his own choice if the king did not present a candidate within the required time.) and the right of reservation were conceded to the pope. Since he had to present a suitable and qualified candidate, "the king's choice was not to be purely arbitrary". The concordat also stipulated annates and other matters.

In 1663, the College of Sorbonne solemnly declared that it admitted no authority of the pope over the king's temporal dominion, his superiority to a general council or infallibility apart from the Church's consent.

In 1673, King Louis XIV of France, an absolute monarch, extended the droit de régale throughout the Kingdom of France. There were two types of régale: régale temporelle and régale spirituelle. Prior kings of France had affirmed the droit de régale as their right by virtue of the supremacy of the Crown over all episcopal sees, even those that had been exempt from the assertion of that right. (Note: For centuries, back in the Middle Ages, seizure of ecclesiastical rights on the part of the state had resulted in innumerable abuses and depredations.) Under Louis XIV, the claims to appropriate revenues of vacant episcopal sees and to make appointments to benefices were vigorously enforced. The Parlements were pleased and most bishops yielded without serious protest. Only two prelates, Nicolas Pavillon, bishop of Alet, and François de Caulet, bishop of Pamiers, both Jansenists, resisted the royal encroachment. Both unsuccessfully appealed to their metropolitan archbishop, who sided with Louis XIV, and they appealed to Pope Innocent XI in 1677. (Note: Caulet died in 1680. The Diocese of Pamiers' cathedral chapter elected a diocesan administrator of the vacant see, for the sede vacante period, without admitting the pro-régale faction to vote. It was resisted by the government; the pro-régale faction forced their way into the cathedral and attempted to annul the election but were violently denounced from the pulpit by one of their opponents and threatened with excommunication. The revolt escalated, and an armed force was sent from Toulouse to restore order. Joseph de Montpezat de Carbon, archbishop of Toulouse, also intervened and replaced the cathedral chapter's nominees with a priest of his choice as the diocesan administrator. The cathedral chapter, on its part, appointed Jean Cerle, Caulet's vicar general, as diocesan administrator. Cerle was unable to act publicly since the pro-régale faction exercised authority in the diocese, with the support of the civil authority, but Cerle wrote pastoral letters, ordinances, appeals to the Pope, and anathemas against his adversaries, from his hideout, "with a rapidity and virulence which provoked angry reprisals." The Parlement of Toulouse prosecuted Cerle for sedition and treason, and, as he refused to appear, he was tried in absentia, condemned to death for contumacy, and executed in effigy both at Toulouse and Pamiers. Innocent XI, in a brief, declared the appointment of vicars-general by Montpezat null and void, cancelled their proceedings as devoid of jurisdiction, and excommunicated all who encouraged them in disobeying his commands, including Montpezat. Innocent XI also declared that faculties granted to priests by the pro-régale faction diocesan administrator, to absolve from sins "were of no effect" and marriages celebrated by priests were invalid.)

In three successive papal briefs Innocent XI urged Louis XIV not to extend the right to dioceses that had previously been exempt, sustaining them with all his authority.

Louis XIV convoked the 1681 Assembly at Paris to consider the droit de régale. It was presided over by François de Harlay de Champvallon, archbishop of Paris, and Charles Maurice Le Tellier, archbishop of Reims. The question of the droit de régale was quickly decided in favor of the king. Louis XIV then asked them to pronounce upon the authority of the pope and the Assembly again sided with the king.

== Four articles ==
The four articles were drafted by Charles Maurice Le Tellier, archbishop of Reims; Gilbert de Choiseul Duplessis Praslin, bishop of Tournai; and Jacques-Bénigne Bossuet, bishop of Meaux. Those article are called the Four Gallican Articles. According to Antoine Dégert, in Catholic Encyclopedia, the doctrines of the four articles are the following:

1. St. Peter and the popes, his successors, and the Church itself have received dominion [puissance] from God only over things spiritual and such as concern salvation and not over things temporal and civil. Hence kings and sovereigns are not by God's command subject to any ecclesiastical dominion in things temporal; they cannot be deposed, whether directly or indirectly, by the authority of the rulers of the Church, their subjects cannot be dispensed from that submission and obedience which they owe, or absolved from the oath of allegiance. (Note: Translations of the four articles vary. Dégert and Otten are virtually identical. Denzinger is more authoritative. Jervis includes a translation of the entire document as does Ehler and Morrall.)
  Dégert commented that article 1 is about absolute independence of the civil power. Sicard commented that article 1 asserted that the pope has no right, direct or indirect, over the temporal power of kings.
2. The plenitude of authority in things spiritual, which belongs to the Holy See and the successors of St. Peter, in no wise affects the permanence and immovable strength of the decrees of the Council of Constance contained in the fourth and fifth sessions of that council, (Note: According to Ehler and Morrall, article 2 refers to the Council of Constance decree Haec sancta Synodus, also known as Sacrosancta, promulgated on April 6, 1415, which was confirmed by the Council of Basel and included in the Pragmatic Sanction of Bourges.) approved by the Holy See, confirmed by the practice of the whole Church and the Roman pontiff, and observed in all ages by the Gallican Church. That Church does not countenance the opinion of those who cast a slur on those decrees, or who lessen their force by saying that their authority is not well established, that they are not approved or that they apply only to the period of the schism.
  Dégert commented that article 2 is about superiority of councils over popes. Sicard commented that article 2 asserted that the pope is inferior to the General Council, and the decrees of the Council of Constance are still binding.
3. The exercise of this Apostolic authority [puissance] must also be regulated in accordance with the canons made by the Spirit of God and consecrated by the respect of the whole world. The rules, customs and constitutions received within the kingdom and the Gallican Church must have their force and their effect, and the usages of our fathers remain inviolable since the dignity of the Apostolic See itself demands that the laws and customs established by consent of that august see and of the Churches be constantly maintained.
  Dégert commented that article 3 is about respect of the canons, a propriety, over obligation to the Holy See. Sicard commented that article 3 asserted that the exercise of pontifical authority should be regulated by the ecclesiastical canons.
4. Although the pope has the chief part in questions of faith, and his decrees apply to all the Churches, and to each Church in particular, yet his judgment is not irreformable, at least pending the consent of the Church.
  Dégert commented that article 4 is about an implied negation of papal infallibility. Sicard commented that article 4 asserted that dogmatic decisions of the pope are not irrevocable until they have been confirmed by the judgment of the whole Church. (Note: The First Vatican Council dogmatic constitution Pastor aeternus defined the dogma that definitions of the extraordinary papal magisterium are irreformable and not from the consent of the church. Costigan explains that its "phraseology is clearly calculated to counter" this article.)

According to the Gallican theory, then, papal primacy was limited by:

- the temporal power of princes, which, by the Divine will, was inviolable
- the authority of the general council and that of the bishops, who alone could, by their assent, give to his decrees that infallible authority which, of themselves, they lacked
- the canons and customs of particular Churches, which the pope was bound to take into account when he exercised his authority

There were two types of Gallicanism:

- Episcopal and political Gallicanism which lessened the doctrinal authority of the pope in favor of that of the bishops, to the degree marked by the Declaration of the clergy of France.
- Parliamentary and judicial Gallicanism which augmented the rights of the State to the prejudice of those of the Church, on the grounds of what was called "the liberties of the Gallican Church" which affected the relations of temporal and spiritual powers. The four articles in the Declaration of the clergy of France were incorporated into this larger previously compiled collection.

Parliamentary Gallicanism was of much wider scope than episcopal and was often disavowed by the bishops of France. W. Henley Jervis wrote, in The Gallican Church, that Gallicanism preceded Louis XIV and it did not originate with the Declaration of the clergy of France, nor was it created by the Concordat of Bologna or the Pragmatic Sanction of Bourges. Two of the most important liberties defended by parliamentary Gallicanism were that kings of France had the right to assemble church councils in their dominions and to make laws and regulations touching ecclesiastical matters.

== Status ==
Louis XIV ordered the Declaration of the Clergy of France to be promulgated from all the pulpits of France. He commanded the registration of the four articles in all the schools and faculties of theology. No one could even be admitted to degrees in theology without maintaining the doctrine in one of his theses, and it was forbidden to write anything against the four articles.

Although it initially resisted, the Sorbonne yielded to the ordinance of registration.

The Jansenist Antoine Arnauld, who was then a refugee at Brussels, Spanish Netherlands, agreed with the doctrine of the four articles and wrote to dissuade Innocent XI from publishing any formal censure of the four articles. Arnauld surmised that a papal denunciation of the four articles would precipitate an "immense advantage into the hands of heretics, to make the Roman Church odious, to raise up obstacles to the conversion of Protestants, and to provoke a still more cruel persecution of the poor Catholics in England". However, Arnauld and most other Jansenists sided with the Holy See about the case of the droit de régale.

Pope Innocent XI hesitated to censure its publication. On April 11, 1682, he protested in a papal brief in which he voided and annulled all that the 1681 Assembly had done in regard to the droit de régale as well as all the consequences of that action, and bound by the Concordat of Bologna, he refused papal confirmations of appointment to those members of the 1681 Assembly who were presented as candidates for vacant sees by Louis XIV. The consequence was that a provision of the Concordat of Bologna was applied by Innocent XI and remained so until the reconciliation between the French court and Holy See in 1693. Meanwhile, the candidates nominated for episcopal sees by Louis XIV enjoyed their revenues and temporal prerogatives but were incapable, according to the terms of the Concordat of Bologna and Catholic doctrine, of executing any part of the spiritual functions of the episcopate. At least 35 dioceses, nearly a third of all dioceses in the kingdom, were without canonically instituted bishops. (Note: The candidates were empowered to administer their dioceses by virtue of commissions from the cathedral chapters appointing them vicars-general or grand-vicars, according to the usual practice in the case of vacant sees.)

The apostolic constitution Inter multiplices pastoralis officii promulgated by Pope Alexander VIII in 1690 and published in 1691, quashed the entire proceedings of the 1681 Assembly and declared that the Declaration of the Clergy of France was null, void and invalid.

On September 14, 1693, Louis XIV rescinded the four articles and "wrote a letter of retraction" to Pope Innocent XII.

The members of the 1681 Assembly who were presented as candidates for vacant sees and were refused papal confirmation of their appointment received confirmation in 1693 only after they had disavowed everything that the 1681 Assembly had decreed regarding ecclesiastical power and pontifical authority.

Nevertheless, according to Dégert, the Declaration of the Clergy of France remained "the living symbol of Gallicanism" that was professed by the majority of the French clergy that defended in the faculties of theology, schools, and seminaries, and French parlements suppressed works that seemed to be hostile to the four articles principles. Those ideas were later expressed during the French Revolution in the Civil Constitution of the Clergy in 1790.

== See also ==
- Synod of Pistoia
- Auctorem fidei
