= Jean-Antoine d'Aubermont =

Joannes Antonius d'Aubermont (1612 – 22 November 1686 in Leuven) was a Dominican theologian of 's-Hertogenbosch.

== Life ==
He joined the Dominicans in 1632 in Ghent, taught philosophy and theology in several convents of his order, was made doctor of theology at Leuven in 1652, and president of the local Dominican college in 1653.

== Works ==
His theological writings are mostly in defence of papal infallibility (1682) and against the Gallican teachings of the Declaration of 1682. Shortly before his death he defended against Papebroch the authorship Thomas Aquinas of the Mass for Corpus Christi.
