= Pareatis =

In French law, Letters of Pareatis were documents required for the extension of a legal decision into jurisdictions other than that where it was originally made. The "Gallican liberties" included a requirement that papal decisions would not have effect in France without the King's Pareatis.
