= Pastor aeternus =

Dogmatic constitution of the First Vatican Council about the papal ministry

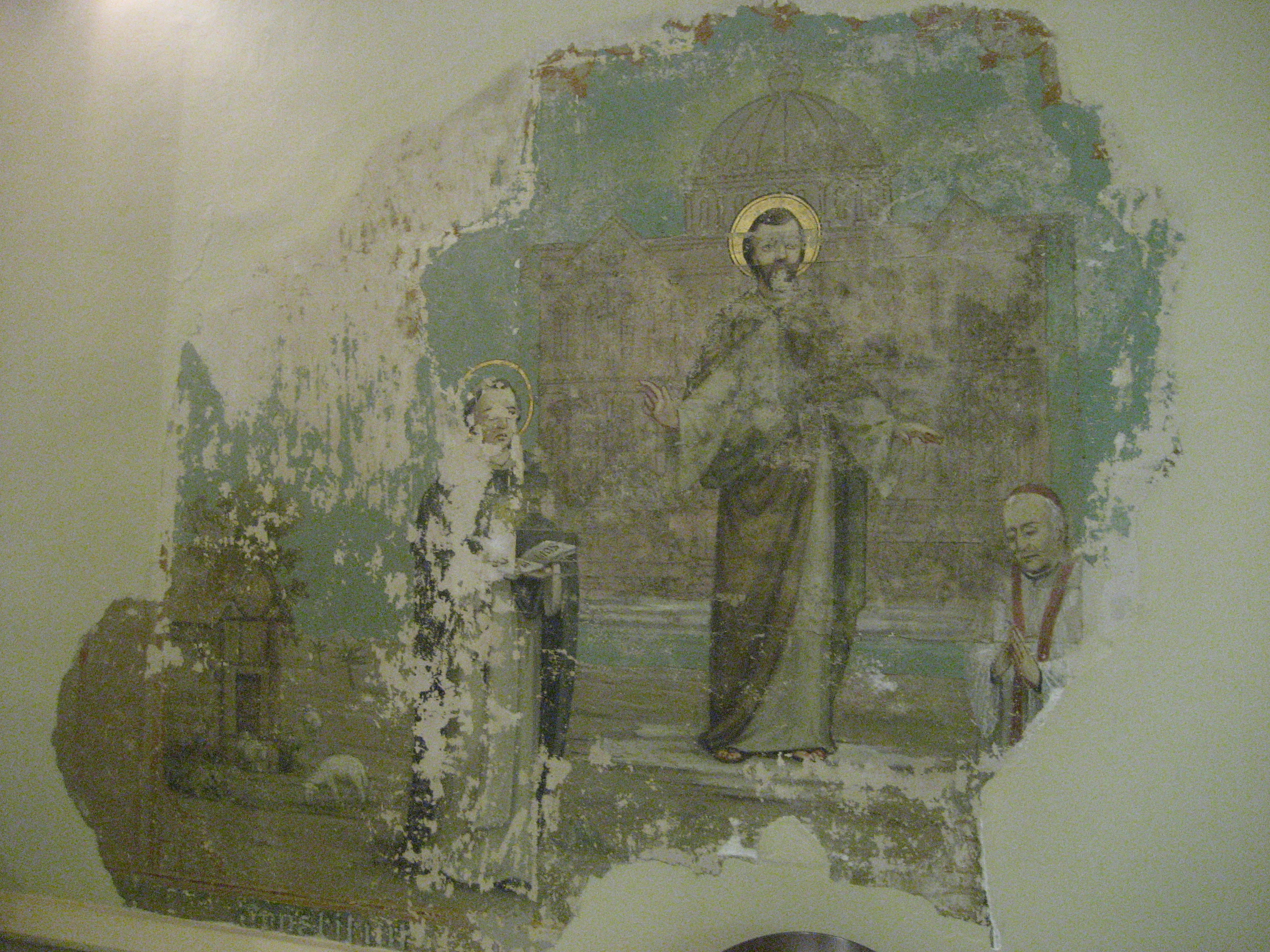
Painting to commemorate the dogma of papal infallibility (Voorschoten, 1870). Left to right: Thomas Aquinas, Christ and Pope Pius IX

Pastor aeternus ("First Dogmatic Constitution on the Church of Christ") was issued by the First Vatican Council, 18 July 1870. The document defines four doctrines of the Catholic faith: the apostolic primacy conferred on Peter, the perpetuity of the Petrine Primacy in the Roman pontiffs, the definition of the papal primacy as a papal supremacy, and Papal infallibility – infallible teaching authority (magisterium) of the Pope.

== Petrine and papal primacy ==
There is general agreement among scholars on the preeminence that the historical Peter held among the disciples of Jesus, making him "the most prominent and influential member of the Twelve during Jesus' ministry and in the early Church".

It was to Simon alone, to whom he had already said You shall be called Cephas, that the Lord,…spoke these words: "Blessed are you, Simon Bar-Jona. For flesh and blood has not revealed this to you, but my Father who is in heaven. And I tell you, you are Peter, and on this rock I will build my Church, and the gates of the underworld shall not prevail against it. I will give you the keys of the kingdom of heaven, and whatever you bind on earth shall be bound in heaven, and whatever you loose on earth shall be loosed in heaven".

The Primacy of Simon Peter is essential to the vision of papal primacy as papal supremacy: that is, the idea that the papacy by divine institution enjoys delegated authority from Jesus over the entire Church. The primacy of the Bishop of Rome over the whole Catholic Church is derived from the pope's status as successor to Peter as "Prince of the Apostles" and as "Vicar of Christ" (Vicarius Christi). The First Vatican Council defined papal primacy in the sense of papal supremacy as an essential institution of the Church that can never be relinquished.

== Magisterium ==
In the Catholic Church, the word "Magisterium" refers to the teaching authority of the church. This authority is understood to be embodied in the episcopacy, which is the aggregation of the current bishops of the church, led by the Bishop of Rome (the Pope), who has authority over the bishops, individually and as a body, as well as over each and every Catholic directly.

That apostolic primacy which the Roman Pontiff possesses as successor of Peter, the prince of the apostles, includes also the supreme power of teaching. This Holy See has always maintained this, the constant custom of the Church demonstrates it, and the ecumenical councils, particularly those in which East and West met in the union of faith and charity, have declared it.

=== Ex cathedra ===
There is a distinction between the Solemn Magisterium and the Ordinary Magisterium. When the Pope issues a dogmatic definition, he is speaking ex cathedra in an exercise of the Solemn Magisterium. Ex cathedra means literally "from the chair"; it is a theological term which signifies authoritative teaching and is more particularly applied to the definitions given by the Roman pontiff. The second form of Church teaching, the Ordinary Magisterium, is continually exercised by the Church especially in her universal teaching regarding with faith and morals.

For a Papal statement to be considered "ex cathedra" it must be made by the Pope as supreme teacher and pastor of the entire church; it must be on a matter of faith and morals; and it must be definitive, and applicable to the universal church.

== Infallibility ==
Papal infallibility was thus formally defined in 1870, although the tradition behind this view goes back much further. In the conclusion of the fourth chapter of Pastor aeternus, the council declared the following:

...We teach and define that it is a dogma divinely revealed that the Roman pontiff when he speaks ex cathedra, that is when in discharge of the office of pastor and doctor of all Christians, by virtue of his supreme Apostolic authority, he defines a doctrine regarding faith or morals to be held by the universal Church, by the Divine assistance promised to him in blessed Peter, is possessed of that infallibility with which the divine Redeemer willed that his Church should be endowed in defining doctrine regarding faith or morals, and that therefore such definitions of the Roman pontiff are of themselves, and not from the consent of the Church, irreformable.

The chapter was subject to two votes in July 1870. In the first on 13 July there were 601 voters: 451 affirmative, 62 conditional affirmative, and 88 negative. The latter groups were then permitted to leave; others left because of the imminent Franco-Prussian War. The final vote on 18 July saw 433 affirmative and only two negative votes, from bishops Aloisio Riccio and Edward Fitzgerald.

According to Catholic theology, this is an infallible dogmatic definition by an ecumenical council. Because the 1870 definition is not seen by Catholics as a creation of the Church, but as the dogmatic definition of a truth about the Church Magisterium, Papal teachings made prior to the 1870 proclamation can, if they meet the criteria set out in the dogmatic definition, be considered infallible. Ineffabilis Deus is an example of this.

== Opposition and criticism ==
The Catholic priest August Bernhard Hasler wrote a detailed criticism of the First Vatican Council, presenting the passage of the infallibility definition as orchestrated. Mark E. Powell, in his examination of the topic from a Protestant point of view, writes: "August Hasler portrays Pius IX as an uneducated, abusive megalomaniac, and Vatican I as a council that was not free. Hasler, though, is engaged in heated polemic and obviously exaggerates his picture of Pius IX. Accounts like Hasler's, which paint Pius IX and Vatican I in the most negative terms, are adequately refuted by the testimony of participants at Vatican I".

== See also ==
- Lumen gentium
