= Inter multiplices pastoralis officii =

- Created: August 4, 1690
- Author: Pope Alexander VIII
- Purpose: Declared that the 1682 Declaration of the clergy of France was null and void, and invalid.

Inter multiplices pastoralis officii (Ecclesiastical Latin: [ˈinter mulˈtiplitʃes pastoˈralis ofˈfitʃi.i]) is an apostolic constitution in the form of a papal bull promulgated by Pope Alexander VIII in 1690, and published in 1691. This decree reversed previous pronouncements by the French Catholic Church.

== Scope ==
Inter multiplices pastoralis officii quashed the entire proceedings of the 1681 Assembly of the French clergy and declared that its 1682 Declaration of the Clergy of France, on the liberties of the Gallican Church and ecclesiastical authority, was null and void, and invalid.

According to the Enchiridion symbolorum, the decree "did not impose a theological censure on the articles". Costigan notes that it "does not make any particular comments" either about conciliarism or about "the consensus of the Church" addressed in the articles.

== Status in ecclesiastical law ==
Charles Bachofen commented about 1917 Code of Canon Law's canon 1323 on the material object of faith; Bachofen states that papal "decisions do not receive their obligatory force from the consent of the Church" as asserted in Declaration of the clergy of France article 2, "but embrace the whole extent of the object of the infallibility inherent in the teaching Church." "The term 'null and void' is of course juridical rather than doctrinal. The strongly worded judgment" is written to be on a "juridical level" and affects all four articles of the Declaration of the Clergy of France, according to Richard Costigan.
