= De Pudicitia =

De Pudicitia (On Modesty) is a polemical treatise by Tertullian against the indulgent attitudes of Pope Callixtus I towards those who committed adultery and sexual immorality. It is notably the earliest Christian text which explicitly challenges the authority of the Bishop of Rome and possibly of Bishops in general, even as it acknowledges their Apostolic succession as valid.

== Content ==
Tertullian attacks Callixtus I, the Bishop of Rome, whom he mockingly refers to as "Pontifex Maximus" (the title of the pagan high priest) and "bishop of bishops", for having issued an edict which allowed those who had committed adultery or sexual immorality to be readmitted in the Church after repentance. Tertullian decries the edict as a discouragement of sexual modesty, sarcastically claiming that it would be more fitting to read it aloud in brothels than in churches. Using the First Epistle of John, he argues that there is a difference between sin which does not lead to death and mortal sin and that adultery falls under the latter. He further distinguishes between accepting pagans or heretics who had committed mortal sin before their conversion, which he claims is allowed, and readmitting baptized Christians who had done the same, which should not happen, since the latter should have known better. He clarifies that those who incur in mortal sin after baptism can be forgiven by God if they repent but should be barred from communion with the Church for their whole lives, in order to dissuade other believers from doing the same.

In addition to the Epistle of John, he also approvingly references the Epistle to the Hebrews, which he attributes to Barnabas, while he rejects the canonicity of the Shepherd of Hermas (which states that a man should forgive and take back her adulterous wife if she returns and repents), terming it "that apocryphal Shepherd of adulterers".

He notably rejects the claim that the power of "binding and loosing" granted to Peter the Apostle (Matthew 16:19) extends to the Apostolic Churches.

If because the Lord has said to Peter, "Upon this rock will I build My Church", "to you have I given the keys of the heavenly kingdom", and "Whatsoever you shall have bound or loosed in earth, shall be bound or loosed in the heavens", you therefore presume that the power of binding and loosing has given to you, that is, to every Church akin to Peter, what sort of man are you, subverting and wholly changing the manifest intention of the Lord, who conferred it personally upon Peter? "Upon you" He says, "will I build my Church" and "I will give to you the keys", not to the Church; and, "Whatsoever you shall have loosed or bound", not what they shall have loosed or bound.
