= Salonius of Embrun =

Salonius of Embrun and Sagittarius of Gap were two bishops who had been condemned at the Council of Lyon (c. 567). They were detained in Saint-Marcel-lès-Chalon (near Chalon, eastern Gaul). They succeeded, however, in persuading Guntram, King of Burgundy, that they had been condemned unjustly, and appealed to the pope. Influenced by the king's letters, Pope John III decided that they must be restored to their sees.
