= Papal primacy =

Catholic ecclesiological doctrine

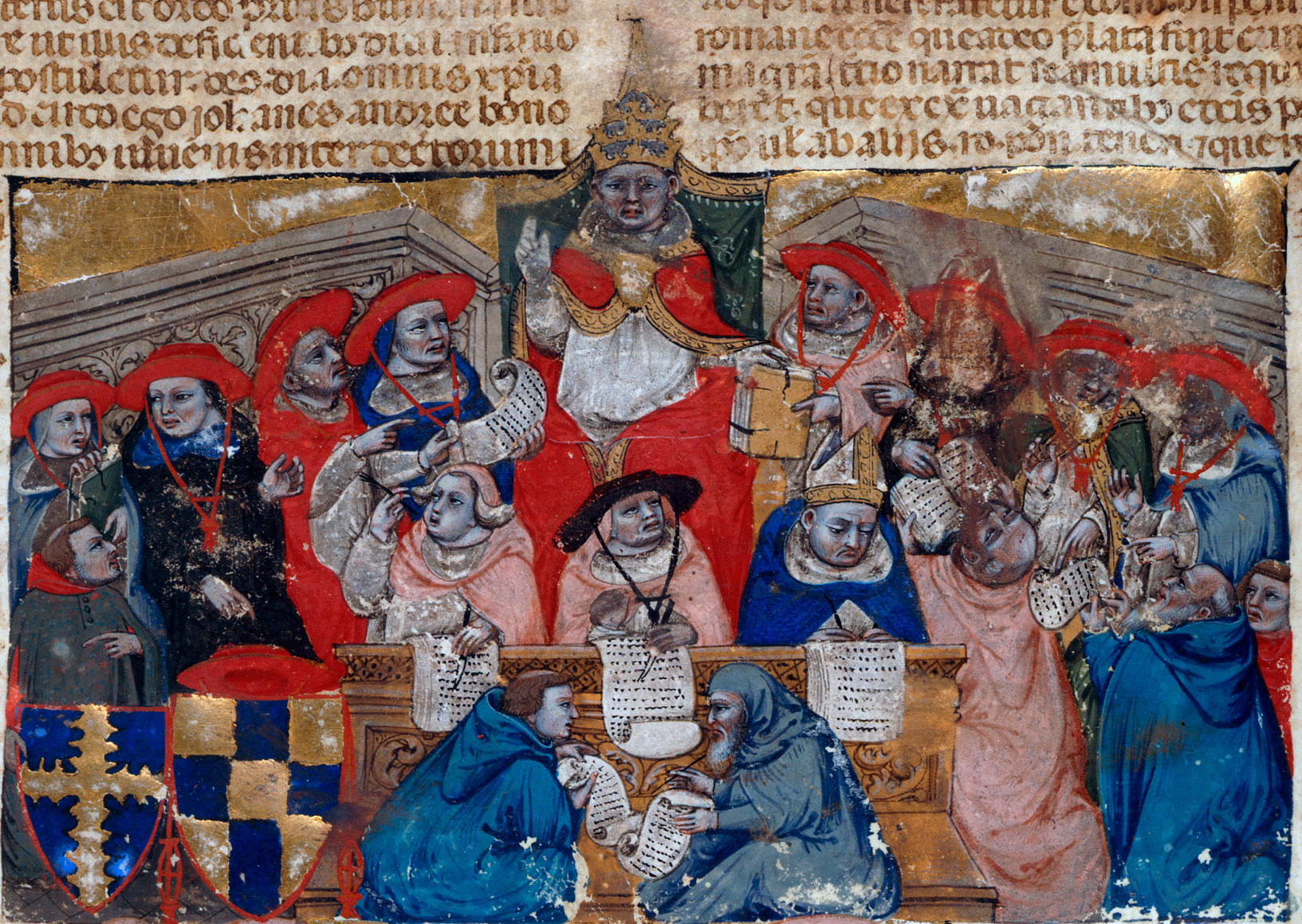
Boniface VIII and his cardinals. Illustration of a 14th-century edition of the Decretals.

Papal primacy, also known as the primacy of the bishop of Rome, is an ecclesiological doctrine in the Catholic Church concerning the respect and authority that is due to the pope from other bishops and their episcopal sees. While the doctrine is accepted at a fundamental level by both the Catholic Church and the Eastern Orthodox Church, the two disagree on the nature of primacy.

English academic and Catholic priest Aidan Nichols wrote that "at root, only one issue of substance divides the Eastern Orthodox and the Catholic Churches, and that is the issue of the primacy." French Eastern Orthodox researcher Jean-Claude Larchet wrote that, together with the Filioque controversy, differences in interpretation of this doctrine have been and remain the primary causes of schism between the Catholic Church and the Eastern Orthodox Church. In the Eastern Orthodox churches, some understand the primacy of the bishop of Rome to be merely one of greater honour, regarding him as primus inter pares ("first among equals"), without effective power over other churches. Alexander Schmemann, a prominent 20th century Eastern Orthodox Christian theologian, envisioned a primacy that sums up rather than rules over: "Primacy is power, but as power it is not different from the power of a bishop in each church. It is not a higher power but indeed the same power, only expressed, manifested, and realized by one."

The Catholic Church attributes to the primacy of the pope "full, supreme, and universal power over the whole Church, a power which he can always exercise unhindered," a power that it attributes also to the entire body of the bishops united with the pope. The power that it attributes to the pope's primatial authority has limitations that are official, legal, dogmatic, and practical.

In the Ravenna Document, issued in 2007, representatives of the Eastern Orthodox Church and the Catholic Church jointly stated that both accept the bishop of Rome's primacy at the universal level, but that differences of understanding exist about how the primacy is to be exercised and about its scriptural and theological foundations.

== Dogma within Latin and Eastern Catholic Churches ==
The Catholic dogma of the primacy of the bishop of Rome is codified in both codes of canon law of the Catholic Church – the Latin Church's 1983 Code of Canon Law (1983 CIC) and the Eastern Catholic Churches' 1990 Code of Canons of the Eastern Churches (CCEO). The Second Vatican Council's 1964 dogmatic constitution Lumen gentium (LG) declared that the "pope's power of primacy" is by "virtue of his office, that is as Vicar of Christ and pastor of the whole Church", and is "full, supreme and universal power over the Church" which he "is always free to exercise". The primacy of the bishop of Rome, according to John Hardon in Catholic Dictionary, is "primacy of jurisdiction, which means the possession of full and supreme teaching, legislative, and sacerdotal powers in the Catholic Church"; it is authority "not only in faith and morals but Church discipline and in the government of the Church."

In 1983 CIC canon 331, the "bishop of the Roman Church" is both the "vicar of Christ" and "pastor of the universal Church on earth". Knut Walf, in New commentary on the Code of Canon Law, notes that this description, "bishop of the Roman Church", is only found in this canon, and the term Roman pontiff is generally used in 1983 CIC. Ernest Caparros et al's Code of Canon Law Annotated comments that this canon pertains to all individuals and groups of faithful within the Latin Church, of all rites and hierarchical ranks, "not only in matters of faith and morals but also in all that concerns the discipline and government of the Church throughout the whole world". Heinrich Denzinger, Peter Hünermann, et al. Enchiridion symbolorum (DH) states that Christ did not form the Church as several distinct communities, but unified through full communion with the bishop of Rome and profession of the same faith with the bishop of Rome.

The bishop of Rome is a subject of supreme authority over the sui iuris Eastern Catholic Churches. In CCEO canon 45, the bishop of Rome has "by virtue of his office" both "power over the entire Church" and "primacy of ordinary power over all the eparchies and groupings of them" within each of the Eastern Catholic Churches. Through the office "of the supreme pastor of the Church," he is in communion with the other bishops and with the entire Church, and has the right to determine whether to exercise this authority either personally or collegially. This "primacy over the entire Church" includes primacy over Eastern Catholic patriarchs and eparchial bishops, over governance of institutes of consecrated life, and over judicial affairs.

Primacy of the bishop of Rome was also codified in the 1917 Code of Canon Law (1917 CIC) canons 218–221.

== Development of the doctrine ==
The Catholic Church bases its doctrine of papal primacy on the primacy among the apostles that Jesus gave to Peter in Matthew 16:16–19:

Blessed are you, Simon Bar-Jonah. For flesh and blood has not revealed this to you, but my Father who is in heaven. And I tell you, you are Peter, and on this rock I will build my church, and the gates of hell shall not prevail against it. I will give you the keys of the kingdom of heaven, and whatever you bind on earth shall be bound in heaven, and whatever you loose on earth shall be loosed in heaven

and in John 21:15–17: "Feed my lambs [...] Feed my sheep."

While acknowledging that "the New Testament contains no explicit record of a transmission of Peter's leadership; nor is the transmission of apostolic authority in general very clear," it considers that its doctrine has a developmental history and that its teaching about matters such as the Trinity, the divinity of Christ, and the union of his two natures in a single person developed as the result of drawing out from the original revealed truth consequences that were not obvious at first: "Thanks to the assistance of the Holy Spirit, the understanding of both the realities and the words of the heritage of faith is able to grow in the life of the Church 'through the contemplation and study of believers who ponder these things in their hearts'; it is in particular 'theological research [which] deepens knowledge of revealed truth.'"

Accordingly, it would be a mistake to expect to find the modern fully developed doctrine of papal primacy in the first centuries, thereby failing to recognize the Church's historical reality. The figure of the pope as leader of the worldwide church developed over time, as the figure of the bishop as leader of the local church seems to have appeared later than in the time of the apostles. (Note: "It is not a greater difficulty that St. Ignatius does not write to the Asian Greeks about Popes, than that St. Paul does not write to the Corinthians about Bishops. [...] No doctrine is defined till it is violated.")

That the Christian scriptures, which contain no cut-and-dried answers to questions such as whether or not there is forgiveness for post-baptismal sins, and whether or not infants should be baptized, gradually become clearer in the light of events, is a view expressed, when considering the doctrine of papal primacy, by Cardinal John Henry Newman, who summed up his thought by saying:

[...] developments of Christianity are proved to have been in the contemplation of its Divine Author, by an argument parallel to that by which we infer intelligence in the system of the physical world. In whatever sense the need and its supply are a proof of design in the visible creation, in the same do the gaps, if the word may be used, which occur in the structure of the original creed of the Church, make it probable that those developments, which grow out of the truths which lie around them, were intended to fill them up."

Modern Eastern Orthodox writers such as Nikolay Afanásiev and Alexander Schmemann have written that the phrase "presiding in agape", used of the Church of Rome in the letter that Ignatius of Antioch addressed to it in the early 2nd century, contains a definition of that Church's universal primacy; but the Catholic writer Klaus Schatz warns that it would be wrong to read this letter and the even earlier First Epistle of Clement (the name of Clement was added only later), in which the Church of Rome intervenes in matters of the Church of Corinth, admonishing it in authoritative tones, even speaking in the name of God, as statements of the developed Catholic teaching on papal primacy. It was only later that the expression of Ignatius of Antioch could be interpreted as meaning, as agreed by representatives of both the Catholic and the Eastern Orthodox Churches, that "Rome, as the Church that 'presides in love' according to the phrase of St Ignatius of Antioch (To the Romans, Prologue), occupied the first place in the taxis [lit. 'arrangement, order')], and that the bishop of Rome was therefore the protos [lit. 'first')] among the patriarchs".

The same agreement stated:

In the history of the East and of the West, at least until the ninth century, a series of prerogatives was recognised, always in the context of conciliarity, according to the conditions of the times, for the protos or kephale [lit. 'head')] at each of the established ecclesiastical levels: locally, for the bishop as protos of his diocese with regard to his presbyters and people; regionally, for the protos of each metropolis with regard to the bishops of his province, and for the protos of each of the five patriarchates, with regard to the metropolitans of each circumscription; and universally, for the bishop of Rome as protos among the patriarchs. This distinction of levels does not diminish the sacramental equality of every bishop or the catholicity of each local Church.

=== Basis of claims to primacy ===
==== Peter and Paul ====
The evolution of earlier tradition established both Peter and Paul as the forefathers of the bishops of Rome, from whom they received their position as chief shepherd (Peter) and supreme authority on doctrine (Paul). To establish her primacy among the churches of the Western half of the empire, the bishops of Rome relied on a letter written in 416 by Innocent I to the Bishop of Gubbio, to show how subordination to Rome had been established. Since Peter was the only apostle (no mention of Paul) to have worked in the West, thus the only persons to have established churches in Italy, Spain, Gaul, Sicily, Africa, and the Western islands were bishops appointed by Peter or his successors. This being the case then, all congregations had to abide by the regulations set in Rome.

===== Primacy of Peter the apostle =====
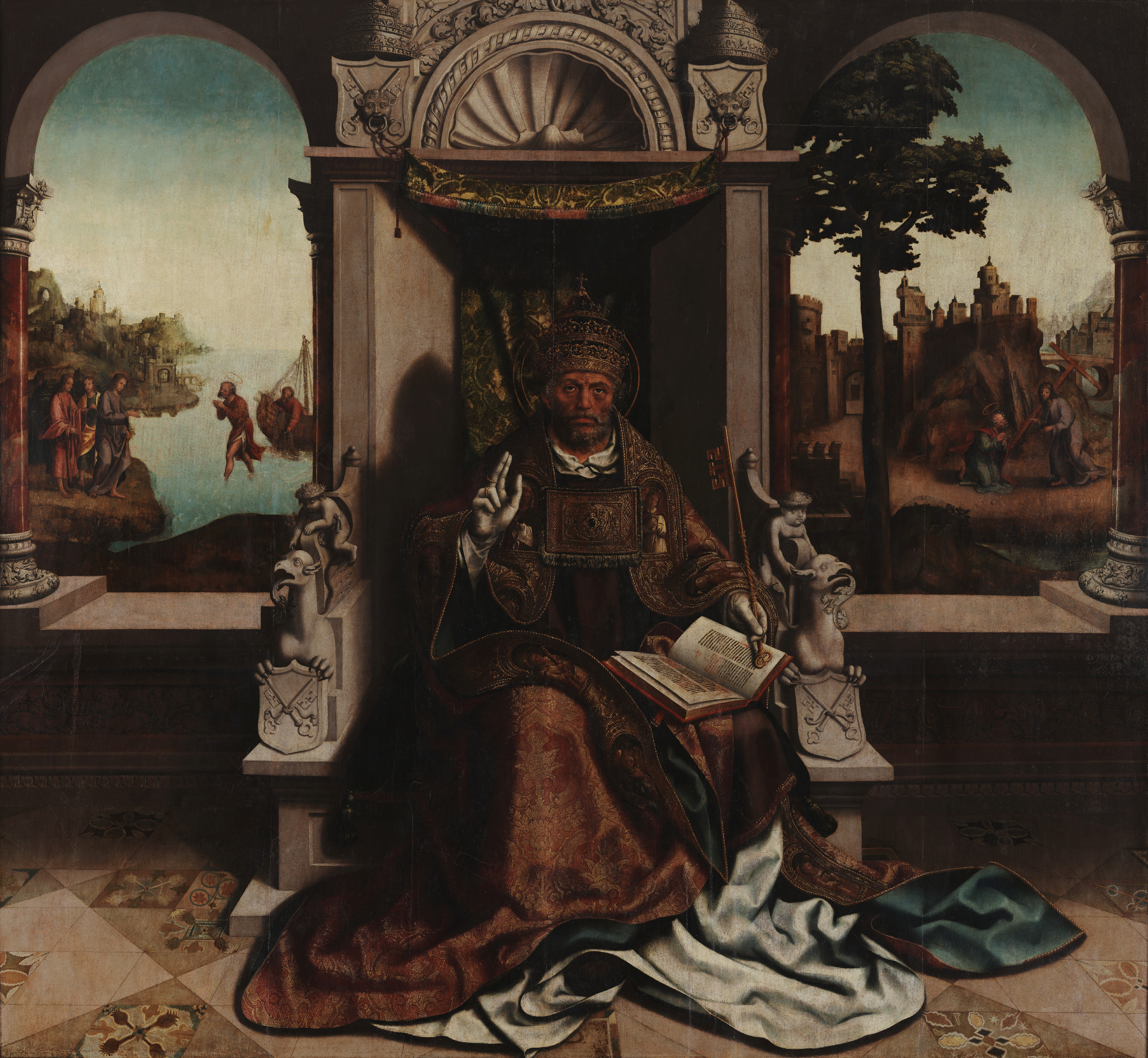
Saint Peter, c. 1529, by Grão Vasco; Peter is portrayed in full papal regalia.

Because of its association with the supposed position of Peter among the apostles, the function that, within the Catholic Church, is exercised by the Bishop of Rome among the bishops as a whole is referred to as the Petrine function, and is generally believed to be of divine institution, in the sense that the historical and sociological factors that influenced its development are seen as guided by the Holy Spirit. Not all Catholic theologians see a special providential intervention as responsible for the result, but most see the papacy, regardless of its origin, as now essential to the Church's structure.

The presence of Peter in Rome, not explicitly affirmed in, but consistent with, the New Testament, is explicitly affirmed by Clement of Rome, Ignatius of Antioch, Irenaeus of Lyon and other early Christian writers – and no other place has ever claimed to be the location of his death. The same witnesses imply that Peter was the virtual founder of the Church of Rome, though not its founder in the sense of initiating a Christian community there. They also speak of Peter as the one who initiated its episcopal succession, but speak of Linus as the first bishop of Rome after Peter, although some hold today that the Christians in Rome did not act as a single united community under a single leader until the 2nd century.

Classic Roman Catholic tradition maintained that the universal primacy of the bishop of Rome was divinely instituted by Jesus Christ. This was derived from the Petrine texts, and from the gospel accounts of Matthew (16:17‑19), Luke (22:32) and John (21:15‑17) according to the Roman tradition, they all refer not simply to the historical Peter, but to his successors to the end of time. Today, scriptural scholars of many traditions agree that it is possible to discern in the New Testament an early tradition that attributes a special position to Peter among Christ's twelve apostles. The Church built its identity on them as witnesses, and responsibility for pastoral leadership was not restricted to Peter. In Matthew 16:19, Peter is explicitly commissioned to "bind and loose"; later, in Matthew 18:18, Christ directly promises all the disciples that they will do the same. Similarly, the foundation upon which the Church is built is related to Peter in Matthew 16:16, and to the whole apostolic body elsewhere in the New Testament (cf. Eph. 2:20).

===== Role of Paul in the founding of the Church of Rome =====
Irenaeus of Lyon (AD 189) wrote that Peter and Paul had founded the Church in Rome and had appointed Pope Linus to the office of the episcopate, the beginning of the succession of the Roman see. (Note: the "[...] the very great, the very ancient, and universally known Church founded and organized at Rome by the two most glorious apostles, Peter and Paul; as also [by pointing out] the faith preached to men, which comes down to our time by means of the successions of the bishops. [...] The blessed apostles, then, having founded and built up the Church, committed into the hands of Linus the office of the episcopate.") Although the introduction of Christianity was not due to them, "the arrival, ministries and especially the martyrdoms of Peter and Paul were the seminal events which really constituted the Church of Rome. It was from their time, and not before, that an orderly and meetly ordained succession of Bishops originated."

== Historical development ==
While the doctrine of the primacy of the Bishop of Rome, in the form in which it is upheld today in the Catholic Church, developed over the course of centuries, often in reaction to challenges made against exercises of authority by popes, writers both of East and West declare that from a very early period the Church of Rome was looked to as the centre of reference for the whole Church. Thus Schmemann wrote:

It is impossible to deny that, even before the appearance of local primacies, the Church from the first days of her existence possessed an ecumenical center of unity and agreement. In the apostolic and Judeo-Christian period, it was the Church of Jerusalem, and later the Church of Rome – presiding in agape, according to St. Ignatius of Antioch. This formula, and the definition of the universal primacy contained in it, have been aptly analyzed by Fr Afanassieff and we need not repeat his argument here. Neither can we quote here all testimonies of the fathers and the councils unanimously acknowledging Rome as the senior church and the center of ecumenical agreement. It is only for the sake of biased polemics that one can ignore these testimonies, their consensus and significance.

In their The See of Peter (1927), non-Catholic academic historians James T. Shotwell and Louise Ropes Loomis, noted the following:

Unquestionably, the Roman church very early developed something like a sense of obligation to the oppressed all over Christendom. ... Consequently, there was but one focus of authority. By the year 252, there seem to have been one hundred bishops in central and southern Italy but outside Rome there was nothing to set one bishop above another. All were on a level together, citizens of Italy, accustomed to look to Rome for direction in every detail of public life. The Roman bishop had the right not only to ordain but even, on occasion, to select bishops for Italian churches. ... To Christians of the Occident, the Roman church was the sole, direct link with the age of the New Testament and its bishop was the one prelate in their part of the world in whose voice they discerned echoes of the apostles' speech. The Roman bishop spoke always as the guardian of an authoritative tradition, second to none. Even when the eastern churches insisted that their traditions were older and quite as sacred, if not more so, the voice in the West, unaccustomed to rivalry at home, spoke on regardless of protest or denunciation at a distance.

=== Pope as arbiter ===
Eastern Orthodox theologian Nicholas Afanassieff cites Irenaeus in Against Heresies 3:4:1 as illuminating that during the pre-Nicene period, the Church of Rome acted as arbiter in resolving disputes between local churches. Rome's support would ensure success, while refusal from Rome predetermined the attitude the other churches would adopt.

In the aftermath of the Decian persecution, Pope Stephen I (254-257) was asked by Cyprian of Carthage (d. 258) to resolve a dispute among the bishops of Gaul as to whether those who had lapsed could be reconciled and readmitted to the Christian community. Cyprian stressed the Petrine primacy as well as the unity of the Church and the importance of being in communion with the bishops. For Cyprian, "the Bishop of Rome is the direct heir of Peter, whereas the others are heirs only indirectly", and he insisted that "the Church of Rome is the root and matrix of the Catholic Church". Cyprian wrote Pope Stephen asking him to instruct the bishops of Gaul to condemn Marcianus of Arles, (who refused to admit those who repented) and to elect another bishop in his stead.

It was to Pope Damasus I (366–384) that Jerome appealed in 376, to settle a dispute as to who, among three rival claimants, was the legitimate Patriarch of Antioch.

In the strictest sense of the word, "decretal" means a papal rescript (rescriptum), an answer of the pope when he has been appealed to or his advice has been sought on a matter of discipline. The oldest preserved decretal is a letter of Pope Siricius (r. 384-399) in response to an inquiry from Himerius, Bishop of Tarragona (fl. 385), in which Siricius issued decisions on fifteen different points, on matters regarding baptism, penance, church discipline and the celibacy of the clergy.

=== Quartodeciman controversy ===
The Quartodeciman controversy arose because Christians in the Roman province of Asia (Western Anatolia) celebrated Easter at the spring full moon, like the Jewish Passover, while the churches in the West observed the practice of celebrating it on the following Sunday ("the day of the resurrection of our Saviour").

In 155, Anicetus, bishop of Rome, presided over a church council at Rome that was attended by a number of bishops including Polycarp, bishop of Smyrna. Although the council failed to reach agreement on the issue, ecclesiastical communion was preserved. A generation later, synods of bishops in Palestine, Pontus and Osrhoene in the east, and in Rome and Gaul in the west, unanimously declared that the celebration should be exclusively on Sunday. In 193, Victor, bishop of Rome, presided over a council at Rome and subsequently sent a letter about the matter to Polycrates of Ephesus and the churches of the Roman province of Asia.

In the same year, Polycrates presided over a council at Ephesus attended by several bishops throughout that province, which rejected Victor's authority and kept the province's paschal tradition. Thereupon, Victor attempted to cut off Polycrates and the others who took this stance from the common unity, but later reversed his decision after bishops, that included Irenaeus of Lyon in Gaul, interceded and recommended that Victor adopt the more tolerant stance of his predecessor, Anicetus.

This incident is cited by some Orthodox Christians as the first example of overreaching by the Bishop of Rome and resistance of such by Eastern churches. Laurent Cleenewerck suggests that this could be argued to be the first fissure between the Eastern and Western churches. According to James McCue, Victor's threatened excommunication was an "intradiocesan affair" between two local churches and did not pertain to the universal church.

=== First Council of Nicaea ===
The First Council of Nicaea was convened by the Roman Emperor Constantine I in 325. Canon IV states: "A bishop is to be chosen by all the bishops of the province, or at least by three, the rest giving by letter their assent; but this choice must be confirmed by the Metropolitan." Karl Josef von Hefele says that this was probably in response to Melitius of Lycopolis, who "had nominated bishops without the concurrence of the other bishops of the province, and without the approval of the metropolitan of Alexandria, and had thus occasioned a schism. This canon was intended to prevent the recurrence of such abuses."

=== First Council of Constantinople and its context ===
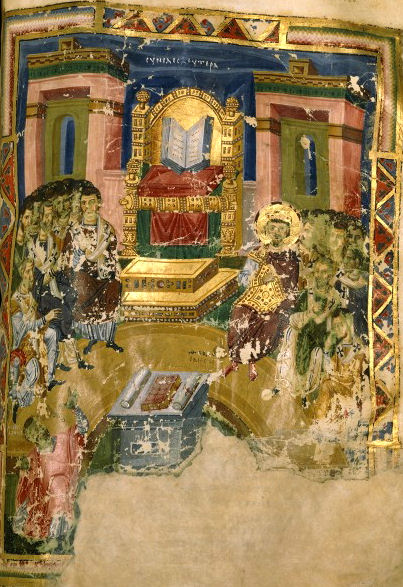
Early manuscript illustration of the First Council of Constantinople

The event that is often considered to have been the first conflict between Rome and Constantinople was triggered by the elevation of the see of Constantinople to a position of honour, second only to Rome on the grounds that, as capital of the eastern Roman empire, it was now the "New Rome". This was promulgated in the First Council of Constantinople (381) canon 3 which decreed: "The Bishop of Constantinople, however, shall have the prerogative of honour after the Bishop of Rome because Constantinople is New Rome." Thomas Shahan says that, according to Photius, Pope Damasus approved the council of Constantinople, but he adds that, if any part of the council were approved by this pope, it could have been only its revision of the Nicene Creed, as was the case also when Gregory the Great recognized it as one of the four general councils, but only in its dogmatic utterances.

The increasing involvement of Eastern emperors in church matters and the advancement of the see of Constantinople over the sees of Antioch, Alexandria and Jerusalem led successive bishops of Rome to attempt a sharper definition of their ecclesial position vis-a-vis the other bishops. The first documented use of the description of Saint Peter as first bishop of Rome, rather than as the apostle who commissioned its first bishop, dates from 354, and the phrase "the Apostolic See", which refers to the same apostle, began to be used exclusively of the see of Rome, a usage found also in the Acts of the Council of Chalcedon. From the time of Pope Damasus, the text of Matthew 16:18 ("You are Peter and on this rock I will build my church") is used to support Roman primacy. Pope Innocent I (401–417) claimed that all major cases should be reserved to the see of Rome and wrote: "All must preserve that which Peter the prince of the apostles delivered to the church at Rome and which it has watched over until now, and nothing may be added or introduced that lacks this authority or that derives its pattern from somewhere else." Pope Boniface I (418–422) stated that the church of Rome stood to the churches throughout the world "as the head to the members", a statement that was repeated by the delegates of Pope Leo I to the Council of Chalcedon in 451.

==== Relationship with bishops of other cities ====
Besides Rome, Jerusalem was also held in high prestige in the early Church, both because the Crucifixion and Resurrection of Jesus occurred there, and on account of the 1st-century Council of Jerusalem. Followers of Jesus were first referred to as "Christians" (as well as "Catholic") in Antioch and was, together with Alexandria, important in the thought of the early Church. However, the three main apostolic sees of the early Church (i.e. the See of Antioch, the See of Alexandria, and the See of Rome) were directly related to Peter. Prior to becoming Bishop of Rome, Peter was Bishop of Antioch. Additionally, his disciple Mark founded the church in Alexandria.

==== Leo I ====
The doctrine of the sedes apostolica (apostolic see) asserts that every bishop of Rome, as Peter's successor, possesses the full authority granted to this position and that this power is inviolable on the grounds that it was established by God himself and so not bound to any individual. In line with the norm of Roman law that a person's legal rights and duties passed to his heir, Pope Leo I (440–461) taught that he, as Peter's representative, succeeded to the power and authority of Peter, and he implied that it was through Peter that the other apostles received from Christ strength and stability. Leo argued that the apostle Peter continued to speak to the Christian community through his successors as bishop of Rome. Pope Gelasius I (492–496) stated: "The see of blessed Peter the Apostle has the right to unbind what has been bound by sentences of any pontiffs whatever, in that it has the right to judge the whole church. Neither is it lawful for anyone to judge its judgment, seeing that canons have willed that it might be appealed to from any part of the world, but that no one may be allowed to appeal from it."

The historical and juridical development of the "primacy of the Roman Pontiff" from Pope Gregory I (590–604) to Pope Clement V (1305–1314) was a doctrinal evolution in fidelity of the depositum fidei (deposit of faith).

==== Council of Reims ====
In 1049, the Council of Reims, called by Pope Leo IX, adopted a dogmatic declaration about the primacy of the Roman Pontiff as the successor of Peter: "declaratum est quod solus Romanae sedis pontifex universalis Ecclesiae Primas esset et Apostolicus" (literal translation is "it was declared that only the bishop/pontiff of the see of Rome is the primate of the universal Church and apostolic").

=== Emperor Phocas' decree ===
When Phocas took the Byzantine throne in 602, the Diocese of Rome, Bishop Gregory I, praised Phocas as a "restorer of liberty" and referred to him as a pious and clement lord. Meanwhile Gregory I died in 604, and also his successor, Sabinian, in 606. After almost a year of vacancy, Emperor Phocas appointed Bonafice III as the new bishop of Rome on February 19, 607 AD. Then Phocas writes through imperial decree of the Roman government, proclaims Boniface III as the "Head of all the Churches" and "Universal Bishop". Phocas transfers the title of "Universal Bishop" from Diocese of Constantinople to Diocese of Rome. Boniface sought and obtained a decree from Phocas which he restated that "the See of Blessed Peter the Apostle should be the head of all the Churches" and ensured that the title of "Universal Bishop" belonged exclusively to the Bishop of Rome. This act effectively ended the attempt by Patriarch Cyriacus of Constantinople to establish himself as "Universal Bishop".

=== East–West Schism ===
The dispute about the authority of Roman bishops reached a climax in 1054, when the legate of Pope Leo IX excommunicated Patriarch of Constantinople Michael I Cerularius. Leo IX had, however, died before the legate issued this excommunication, depriving the legate of its authority and thereby rendering the excommunication technically invalid. Similarly, a ceremony of excommunication of Leo IX then performed by Michael I was equally invalid, since one cannot be posthumously excommunicated. This event led to the schism of the Greek and Latin churches. In itself, it did not have the effect of excommunicating the adherents of the respective churches, as the tit-for-tat excommunications, even had they been valid, would have applied to the named persons only. At the time of the excommunications, many contemporary historians, including Byzantine chroniclers, did not consider the event significant.

=== Post-schism period ===
==== Second Council of Lyon (1272–1274) ====
On 31 March 1272, Pope Gregory X convoked the Second Council of Lyon to act on a pledge by Byzantine emperor Michael VIII Palaiologos to reunite the Eastern church with the West. Wishing to end the East-West Schism that divided Rome and Constantinople, Gregory X had sent an embassy to Michael VIII, who had reconquered Constantinople, putting an end to the remnants of the Latin Empire in the East.

On 29 June 1274 (the Feast of Peter and Paul, the patronal feast of popes), Gregory X celebrated Mass in St John's Church where both sides took part. The council declared that the Roman church possessed "the supreme and full primacy and authority over the universal Catholic Church."

The council was seemingly a success, but did not provide a lasting solution to the schism. Michael's death in December 1282 put an end to the union of Lyon. His son and successor Andronikos II Palaiologos repudiated the union.

==== Reformation ====
The primacy of the Pope was again challenged in 1517 when Martin Luther began preaching against several practices in the Catholic Church, including some itinerant friars' abuses involving indulgences. When Pope Leo X refused to support Luther's position, Luther claimed belief in an "invisible church" and called the pope the Antichrist.

Luther's rejection of the primacy of the Pope led to the start of the Protestant Reformation, during which numerous Protestant sects broke away from the Catholic Church. The Church of England also broke away from the Catholic Church at this time, although for reasons different from Martin Luther and the Protestants.

==== First Vatican Council ====
The doctrine of papal primacy was further developed in 1870 at the First Vatican Council, where ultramontanism achieved victory over conciliarism with the pronouncement of papal infallibility (the ability of the pope to define dogmas free from error ex cathedra) and of papal supremacy, i.e., supreme, full, immediate, and universal ordinary jurisdiction of the pope.

The First Vatican Council's dogmatic constitution Pastor aeternus declared that "in the disposition of God the Roman church holds the preeminence of ordinary power over all the other churches." This council also affirmed the dogma of papal infallibility, deciding that the "infallibility" of the Christian community extended to the pope himself, at least when speaking on matters of faith.

Vatican I defined a twofold Primacy of Peter — one in papal teaching on faith and morals (the charism of infallibility), and the other a primacy of jurisdiction involving government and discipline of the Church — submission to both being necessary to Catholic faith and salvation.

Vatican I rejected the ideas that papal decrees have "no force or value unless confirmed by an order of the secular power" and that the pope's decisions can be appealed to an ecumenical council "as to an authority higher than the Roman Pontiff". Paul Collins argues that "(the doctrine of papal primacy as formulated by the First Vatican Council) has led to the exercise of untrammelled papal power and has become a major stumbling block in ecumenical relationships with the Orthodox (who consider the definition to be heresy) and Protestants."

Forced to break off prematurely by secular political developments in 1870, Vatican I left behind it a somewhat unbalanced ecclesiology. "In theology the question of papal primacy was so much in the foreground that the Church appeared essentially as a centrally directed institution which one was dogged in defending but which only encountered one externally", according to Cardinal Joseph Ratzinger (later Pope Benedict XVI).

=== Anticipating Vatican II ===
Pope Paul VI acknowledged with regret that "the primacy of honor and jurisdiction which Christ bestowed on the Apostle Peter, and which We have inherited as his Successor" is regarded as an obstacle to ecumenical reconciliation, but could not see grounds for abandoning the principle of a supreme pastoral office within the church.

=== Eastern Orthodox view ===
The Eastern Orthodox Church considers the Bishop of Rome to be the primus inter pares, that is, first among equals. An example of this would be the Chief Justice in the United States Supreme Court, who holds a pre-eminent honor, but cannot give orders to his fellow justices.

The Eastern Orthodox point out that Jesus gave the power to "bind" and "loose" not only to Peter but to all the Apostles equally (Matthew 18:18). Many Church Fathers noted Jesus' giving this authority more broadly: Tertullian, (Note: "What, now, (has this to do) with the Church, and your (church), indeed, Psychic? For, in accordance with the person of Peter, it is to spiritual men that this power will correspondently appertain, either to an apostle or else to a prophet.") Hilary of Poitiers, (Note: "This faith it is which is the foundation of the Church; through this faith the gates of hell cannot prevail against her. This is the faith which has the keys of the kingdom of heaven. Whatsoever this faith shall have loosed or bound on earth shall be loosed or bound in heaven. This faith is the Father's gift by revelation; even the knowledge that we must not imagine a false Christ, a creature made out of nothing, but must confess Him the Son of God, truly possessed of the Divine nature.") John Chrysostom, (Note: "For (John) the Son of thunder, the beloved of Christ, the pillar of the Churches throughout the world, who holds the keys of heaven, who drank the cup of Christ, and was baptized with His baptism, who lay upon his Master's bosom, with much confidence, this man now comes forward to us now") and Augustine. (Note: "...Peter, the first of the apostles, receive the keys of the kingdom of heaven for the binding and loosing of sins; and for the same congregation of saints, in reference to the perfect repose in the bosom of that mysterious life to come did the evangelist John recline on the breast of Christ. For it is not the former alone but the whole Church, that bindeth and looseth sins; nor did the latter alone drink at the fountain of the Lord's breast, to emit again in preaching, of the Word in the beginning, God with God, and those other sublime truths regarding the divinity of Christ, and the Trinity and Unity of the whole Godhead.") (Note: "How the Church? Why, to her it was said, "To thee I will give the keys of the kingdom of heaven, and whatsoever thou shall loose on earth shall be loosed in heaven, and whatsoever thou shall bind on earth shall be bound in heaven.")

It has been argued that church councils did not consider papal decisions binding. The Third Ecumenical Council was called, even though Pope Celestine I condemned Nestorius as a heretic which Michael Whelton, Catholic convert to Orthodoxy, argues shows that the council did not consider the papal condemnation as definitive.

Catholic Cardinal and theologian Yves Congar stated

The East never accepted the regular jurisdiction of Rome, nor did it submit to the judgment of Western bishops. Its appeals to Rome for help were not connected with a recognition of the principle of Roman jurisdiction but were based on the view that Rome had the same truth, the same good. The East jealously protected its autonomous way of life. Rome intervened to safeguard the observation of legal rules, to maintain the orthodoxy of faith and to ensure communion between the two parts of the church, the Roman see representing and personifying the West...In according Rome a 'primacy of honour', the East avoided basing this primacy on the succession and the still living presence of the apostle Peter. A modus vivendi was achieved which lasted, albeit with crises, down to the middle of the eleventh century.

=== 21st century relations with other Christian denominations ===
In the document Responses to some questions regarding certain aspects of the doctrine on the Church of 29 June 2007 the Congregation for the Doctrine of the Faith reiterated that, in the view of the Catholic Church, the Christian communities born out of the Protestant Reformation and which lack apostolic succession in the sacrament of orders are not "Churches" in the proper sense. The Eastern Christian Churches that are not in communion with Rome, such as the Eastern Orthodox Church, Oriental Orthodoxy and the Assyrian Church of the East, are Churches in the proper sense and sister Churches of the Catholic particular Churches, but since communion with the Pope is one of the internal constitutive principles of a particular church, they lack something in their condition, while on the other hand the existing division means that the fullness of universality that is proper to the church governed by the successor of St Peter and the bishops in communion with him is not now realised in history.

==== Efforts at reconciliation ====
===== Anglican-Roman Catholic International Commission =====
The Anglican-Roman Catholic International Commission (ARCIC) statement of Venice (1976) states that the ministry of the bishop of Rome among his brother bishops was "interpreted" as Christ's will for his church; its importance was compared "by analogy" to the position of Peter among the apostles.

Communion with the bishop of Rome does not imply submission to an authority which would stifle the distinctive features of the local churches. The purpose of the episcopal function of the bishop of Rome is to promote Christian fellowship in faithfulness to the teaching of the apostles.

===== Joint worship service with the Archbishop of Canterbury =====
At a joint service during the first official visit of the then Archbishop of Canterbury, Robert Runcie, to the Vatican, Runcie appealed to Anglicans to consider accepting papal primacy in a reunified church. At the same time, Pope John Paul II stressed that his office must be more than a figurehead.

===== Ut unum sint =====
John Paul II invited, in Ut Unum Sint, his 1995 encyclical on commitment to ecumenism, the "pastors and theologians" of Churches and Ecclesial Communities not in full communion with the Catholic Church to suggest how to exercise papal primacy in ways that would unite rather than divide.

===== Joint International Commission for Theological Dialogue =====
In October 2007, the Joint International Commission for Theological Dialogue Between the Catholic Church and the Orthodox Church, agreed that the pope has primacy among all bishops of the Church, something which has been universally acknowledged by both churches since the First Council of Constantinople in 381 (when they were still one Church) though disagreements about the extent of his authority still continue.

The document "draws an analogy among the three levels of communion: local, regional, and universal, each of which appropriately has a 'first' with the role of fostering communion, in order to ground the rationale of why the universal level must also have a primacy. It articulates the principle that primacy and conciliarity are interdependent and mutually necessary." Speaking of "fraternal relations between bishops" during the first millennium, it states that "these relations, among the bishops themselves, between the bishops and their respective protoi (firsts), and also among the protoi themselves in the canonical order (taxis) witnessed by the ancient Church, nourished and consolidated ecclesial communion." It notes that both sides agree "that Rome, as the church that 'presides in love' according to the phrase of St Ignatius of Antioch, occupied the first place in the taxis (order) and that the bishop of Rome was, therefore, the protos (first) among the patriarchs. They disagree, however, on the interpretation of the historical evidence from this era regarding the prerogatives of the bishop of Rome as protos, a matter that was already understood in different ways in the first millennium"; (Note: The dictionary definition of πρώτοι (prótoi) at Wiktionary.) (Note: The dictionary definition of πρώτος (prótos) at Wiktionary.) (Note: The dictionary definition of τάξις (táksis) at Wiktionary.) and "while the fact of primacy at the universal level is accepted by both East and West, there are differences of understanding with regard to the manner in which it is to be exercised, and also with regard to its scriptural and theological foundations".

Discussions continued at Aghios Nikolaos, Crete, (a drafting committee) in September–October 2008; at Paphos, Cyprus, in October 2009; and Vienna, Austria in September 2010. Hegumen Filipp Ryabykh, the deputy head of the Russian Orthodox Church Department for External Church Relations said:

The fact that the Pope of Rome claims universal jurisdiction is simply contrary to Orthodox ecclesiology, which teaches that the Orthodox Church, whilst preserving unity of faith and church order, nevertheless consists of several [autocephalous] Local Churches

A 2008 draft text on "The Role of the Bishop of Rome in the Communion of the Church in the First Millennium" topic prepared by the Joint International Commission for Theological Dialogue Between the Catholic Church and the Orthodox Church was leaked in 2010, which the Vienna meeting asked to be revised and amplified. This document states that "Catholics and Orthodox agree that, from apostolic times, the Church of Rome has been recognised as the first among the local Churches, both in the East and in the West." Both sides agree that "the primacy of the see precedes the primacy of its bishops and is the source of the latter". While in the West, "the position of the bishop of Rome among the bishops was understood in terms of the position of Peter among the apostles ... the East tended rather to understand each bishop as the successor of all the apostles, including Peter"; but these rather different understandings "co-existed for several centuries until the end of the first millennium, without causing a break of communion".

== Opposition to the doctrine ==
American religious author Stephen K. Ray, a Baptist convert to Catholicism, asserts that "There is little in the history of the Church that has been more heatedly contested than the primacy of Peter and the See of Rome. History is replete with examples of authority spurned, and the history of the Church is no different."

=== Protestant view ===
The topic of the Papacy and its authority is among the main differences between the Catholic Church and many other Christian denominations. For those who hold to the doctrine of sola scriptura, the Bible is considered to be the sole authority on Christian doctrine and theology.

In his book Repair My House: Becoming a "Kingdom" Catholic, Michael H. Crosby, author and Capuchin Franciscan friar, points out that Matthew 18:18 shows that the power of "binding" and "loosing" was not given to Peter alone, but to all the Apostles. Some Church Fathers, like St. John Chrysostom, considered Peter's proclamation of faith, rather than Peter himself, to be the "rock" Jesus praised and said he would make the foundation of the faith. Other Christian writers say that, even if Peter is the "rock", it does not mean he has exclusive power over the Church.

== See also ==
- Collegiality (Catholic Church)
- Conciliarism
- Dogma in the Catholic Church
- Donation of Constantine
- Ecumenical Patriarch of Constantinople, primus inter pares among Eastern Orthodox prelates
- First Vatican Council
- Gregorian Reform
- History of the papacy
- Neo-ultramontanism
- Papal infallibility
- Pontifex Maximus
- Roman Curia
- Servant of the servants of God
- Temporal power (papal)
- Theological differences between the Catholic Church and the Eastern Orthodox Church
- Ultramontanism
- Unam Sanctam
- Translatio imperii

== Bibliography ==
- Anastos, Milton V. (2001). Vryonis, Speros; Goodhue, Nicholas (eds.). Aspects of the mind of Byzantium: political theory, theology, and ecclesiastical relations with the See of Rome. Variorum collected studies. Vol. 717. Burlington, VT: Ashgate. ISBN 978-0-86078-840-9.
- Miller, Maureen C., ed. (2005). "Annales Romani Description of the Synod of Sutri ca. 1046 and Bonizo of Sutri Description of the Synod of Sutri ca. 1085". Power and the holy in the age of the investiture conflict: a brief history with documents. New York: St. Martins Press. ISBN 978-0-312-40468-0.
- Benson, Edward White (1897). Cyprian: his life, his times, his work. New York: Macmillan. OCLC 697711774.
- Braaten, Carl E.; Jenson, Robert W., eds. (2001). Church unity and the papal office: an ecumenical dialogue on John Paul II's encyclical Ut unum sint. Grand Rapids, MI: W. B. Eerdmans. ISBN 978-0-8028-4802-4.
- Carlton, Clark (1997). The faith: understanding Orthodox Christianity: an Orthodox catechism. Faith series. Salisbury, MA: Regina Orthodox Press. ISBN 978-0-9649141-1-7.
- Chrestou, Panagiotes K. (2005). Dragas, George D. (ed.). Greek Orthodox patrology: an introduction to the study of the church fathers. Orthodox theological library. Vol. 2. Translated by George D. Dragas. Rollinsford, NH: Orthodox Research Institute. ISBN 978-1-933275-04-8.
- Congar, Yves (1959). After nine hundred years: the background of the schism between the Eastern and Western churches. New York: Fordham University Press. ISBN 978-0-585-23800-5.
- Denny, Edward (1912). Papalism A treatise on the claims of the papacy as set forth in the encyclical Satis Cognitum. London: Rivingtons. hdl:2027/uc1.$b776343. OCLC 693306249.
- DeVille, Adam A. J. (2011). Orthodoxy and the Roman papacy: Ut Unum Sint and the prospects of East-West unity. Notre Dame, IN: University of Notre Dame Press. ISBN 978-0-268-02607-3.
- Chapman, John (1928). Studies on the early Papacy. London: Sheed & Ward. OCLC 422117622.
- Empie, Paul C.; Murphy, T. Austin, eds. (1974). Papal primacy and the universal church. Lutherans and Catholics in dialogue. Vol. 5. Minneapolis, MN: Augsburg Publishing House. ISBN 978-0-8066-1450-2.
- FitzGerald, Kyriaki Karidoyanes (2006). Persons in communion: a theology of authentic relationships. Distinguished lecture series. Berkeley, CA: InterOrthodox Press. ISBN 978-1-932401-08-0.
- Hasler, August B. (1981). How the Pope became infallible: Pius IX and the politics of persuasion. Translated by Peter Heinegg. Garden City, NY: Doubleday. ISBN 978-0-385-15851-0.
- Herrin, Judith (2007). Byzantium: the surprising life of a medieval empire. Princeton, NJ: Princeton University Press. ISBN 978-0-691-13151-1.
- Hinson, E. Glenn (1995). The church triumphant: a history of Christianity up to 1300. Macon, GA: Mercer University Press. ISBN 978-0-86554-436-9.
- Kelly, John N. D. (1995). Golden mouth: the story of John Chrysostom, ascetic, preacher, bishop. Ithaca, NY: Cornell University Press. ISBN 978-0-8014-3189-0.
- Meyendorff, John (1989). Imperial unity and Christian divisions: The Church 450-680 A.D. The Church in history. Vol. 2. Crestwood, NY: St. Vladimir's Seminary Press. ISBN 978-0-88141-056-3.
- Morrison, John H. (1884). Disquisitions and notes on the Gospels: Matthew (4th ed.). Boston: American Unitarian Association. OCLC 866896706.
- Neill, Stephen (1990). Chadwick, Owen (ed.). A history of Christian mission. The Penguin history of the Church. Vol. 6 (2nd ed.). London [u.a]: Penguin Books. ISBN 978-0-14-013763-7.
- Palladius Helenopolitanus (1985). Meyer, Robert T. (ed.). Dialogue on the life of St. John Chrysostom. Ancient Christian writers: the works of the Fathers in translation. Vol. 45. Translated by Robert T. Meyer. Mahwah, NJ: Newman Press. ISBN 978-0-8091-0358-4.
- Papadakis, Aristeides (1997) [1983]. Crisis in Byzantium: The Filioque Controversy in the Patriarchate of Gregory II of Cyprus (1283-1289) (Rev. ed.). Crestwood, NY: St. Vladimir's Seminary Press. ISBN 9780881411768.
- Papadakis, Aristeides; Meyendorff, John (1994). The Christian East and the rise of the papacy: the church 1071–1453 A.D. The church in history. Vol. 4. Crestwood, NY: St. Vladimir's Seminary Press. ISBN 978-0-88141-058-7.
- Patsavos, Lewis J. (2003). Spiritual dimensions of the holy canons. Brookline, MA: Holy Cross Orthodox Press. ISBN 978-1-885652-68-3.
- Pennington, Arthur R. (1883). Epochs of the papacy: from its rise to the death of Pope Pius IX in 1878. New York: E. P. Dutton. OCLC 844615469.
- Puller, Frederick W. (1900). The primitive saints and the see of Rome (3rd, rev. and enl. ed.). London [u.a.]: Longmans, Green. OCLC 679956657.
- Romanides, John (2004). Dragas, George D. (ed.). An outline of Orthodox patristic dogmatics. Orthodox theological library. Vol. 1. Translated by George D. Dragas. Rollinsford, NH: Orthodox Research Institute. ISBN 978-0-9745618-4-4.
- Runciman, Steven (1977). The Byzantine theocracy. Weil lectures, 1973. Cambridge; New York: Cambridge University Press. ISBN 978-0-521-21401-8.
- Schaeffer, Frank (1994). Dancing alone: the quest for Orthodox faith in the age of false religion. Brookline, MA: Holy Cross Orthodox Press. ISBN 978-0-917651-36-6.
- Ignatius of Antioch (1919) [1900]. The epistles of St. Ignatius: bishop of Antioch. Translations of Christian literature, Series I, Greek texts. Translated by James H. Srawley (3rd ed.). London: Society for Promoting Christian Knowledge. OCLC 608472045.
- Stephens, William R. W. (1883). Saint John Chrysostom, his life and times: a sketch of the church and the empire in the fourth century (3rd ed.). London: J. Murray. OCLC 499596765.
- Vasileios of Stavronikita (1984). Hymn of entry: liturgy and life in the Orthodox church. Contemporary Greek theologians. Vol. 1. Translated by Elizabeth Briere. Crestwood, NY: St. Vladimir's Seminary Press. pp. 52–53. ISBN 978-0-88141-026-6.
- Whelton, Michael (2006). Popes and patriarchs: an Orthodox perspective on Roman Catholic claims. Ben Lomond, CA: Conciliar Press. ISBN 978-1-888212-78-5.
