= First Vatican Council =

Catholic ecumenical council (1869–1870)

- Pope Pius IX seated on throne opening the council, December 1869
- Date: 8 December 1869 – 20 September 1870 (de facto; Capture of Rome); 8 December 1869 – 5 June 1870 (de jure)
- Accepted by: Catholic Church
- Previous council: Council of Trent
- Next council: Second Vatican Council
- Convoked by: Pope Pius IX
- President: Pope Pius IX
- Attendance: About 744
- Topics: Rationalism, materialism, liberalism, papal infallibility, biblical inspiration
- Documents and statements: Two constitutions: Dei Filius; Pastor aeternus

The First Ecumenical Council of the Vatican, commonly known as the First Vatican Council or Vatican I, was the 20th ecumenical council of the Catholic Church, held three centuries after the preceding Council of Trent which was adjourned in 1563. The council was convoked by Pope Pius IX on 29 June 1868, under the rising threat of the Kingdom of Italy encroaching on the Papal States. It opened on 8 December 1869 and was adjourned on 20 September 1870 after the Italian Capture of Rome. Its best-known decision is its definition of papal infallibility.

The council's main purpose was to clarify Catholic doctrine in response to the rising influence of the modern philosophical trends of the 19th century. In the Dogmatic Constitution on the Catholic Faith (Dei Filius), the council condemned what it considered the errors of rationalism, anarchism, communism, socialism, liberalism, materialism, modernism, naturalism, pantheism, and secularism.

Its other concern was the doctrine of the primacy (supremacy) and infallibility of the Bishop of Rome (the Pope), which it defined in the First Dogmatic Constitution on the Church of Christ (Pastor aeternus).

== Background ==
As early as late 1864, Pope Pius IX had commissioned the cardinals resident in Rome to tender him their opinions as to the advisability of a council. The majority supported the scheme, with dissenting voices being rare. After March 1865, the convocation of the council was no longer in doubt. Special bulls were reportedly issued with invitations to Eastern Orthodox and Protestant clerics as well as to other non-Catholics, but apparently none accepted the invitations.

The council was summoned by the pope by a bull on 29 June 1868. The first session was held in St. Peter's Basilica on 8 December 1869. Preliminary sessions dealt with general administrative matters and committee assignments. Bishop Bernard John McQuaid complained of rainy weather, inadequate heating facilities, and boredom. Bishop James Roosevelt Bayley of Newark, New Jersey, noted the high prices in Rome. When Lord Houghton asked Cardinal Manning what had been going on, he answered: "Well, we meet, and we look at one another, and then we talk a little, but when we want to know what we have been doing, we read The Times."

Unlike the five earlier general councils held in Rome, which met in the Lateran Basilica and are known as Lateran councils, this council met in Saint Peter's Basilica in the Vatican, hence its name.

== Papal infallibility ==
The object of the council was a mystery for a while. The first revelation was given in February 1869 by an article in La Civiltà Cattolica, a Jesuit periodical. It claimed, as the view of many Catholics in France, that the council would be of very brief duration, since the majority of its members were in agreement, and mentioned inter alia the proclamation of papal infallibility. Factions around the proposal arose across Europe, and some Italians even proposed setting up a rival council in Naples. However, before the council met all became quiet in view of the studied vagueness of the invitation.

Pope Pius defined as dogma the Immaculate Conception of Mary, the mother of Jesus, in 1854. However, the proposal to define papal infallibility itself as dogma met with resistance, not because of doubts about the substance of the proposed definition, but because some considered it inopportune to take that step at that time. Richard McBrien divides the bishops attending Vatican I into three groups. The first group, which McBrien calls the "active infallibilists", was led by Henry Edward Manning and Ignatius von Senestrey. According to McBrien, the majority of the bishops were not so much interested in a formal definition of papal infallibility as they were in strengthening papal authority and, because of this, were willing to accept the agenda of the infallibilists. A minority, some 10% of the bishops, McBrien says, opposed the proposed definition of papal infallibility on both ecclesiastical and pragmatic grounds, because, in their opinion, it departed from the ecclesiastical structure of the early Christian church. From a pragmatic perspective, they feared that defining papal infallibility would alienate some Catholics, create new difficulties for union with non-Catholics, and provoke interference by governments in ecclesiastical affairs. Those who held this view included most of the German and Austro-Hungarian bishops, nearly half of the Americans, one third of the French, most of the Chaldaeans and Melkites, and a few Armenians. Only a few bishops appear to have had doubts about the dogma itself.

== Dei Filius ==
On 24 April 1870, the dogmatic constitution on the Catholic faith Dei Filius was adopted unanimously. The draft presented to the council on 8 March drew no serious criticism, but a group of 35 English-speaking bishops, who feared that the opening phrase of the first chapter, "Sancta romana catholica Ecclesia" ('Holy Roman Catholic Church'), might be construed as favouring the Anglican branch theory, later succeeded in having an additional adjective inserted, so that the final text read: "Sancta catholica apostolica romana Ecclesia" ('Holy Catholic Apostolic Roman Church'). The constitution thus set forth the teaching of the "Holy Catholic Apostolic Roman Church" on God, revelation and faith.

== Pastor aeternus ==
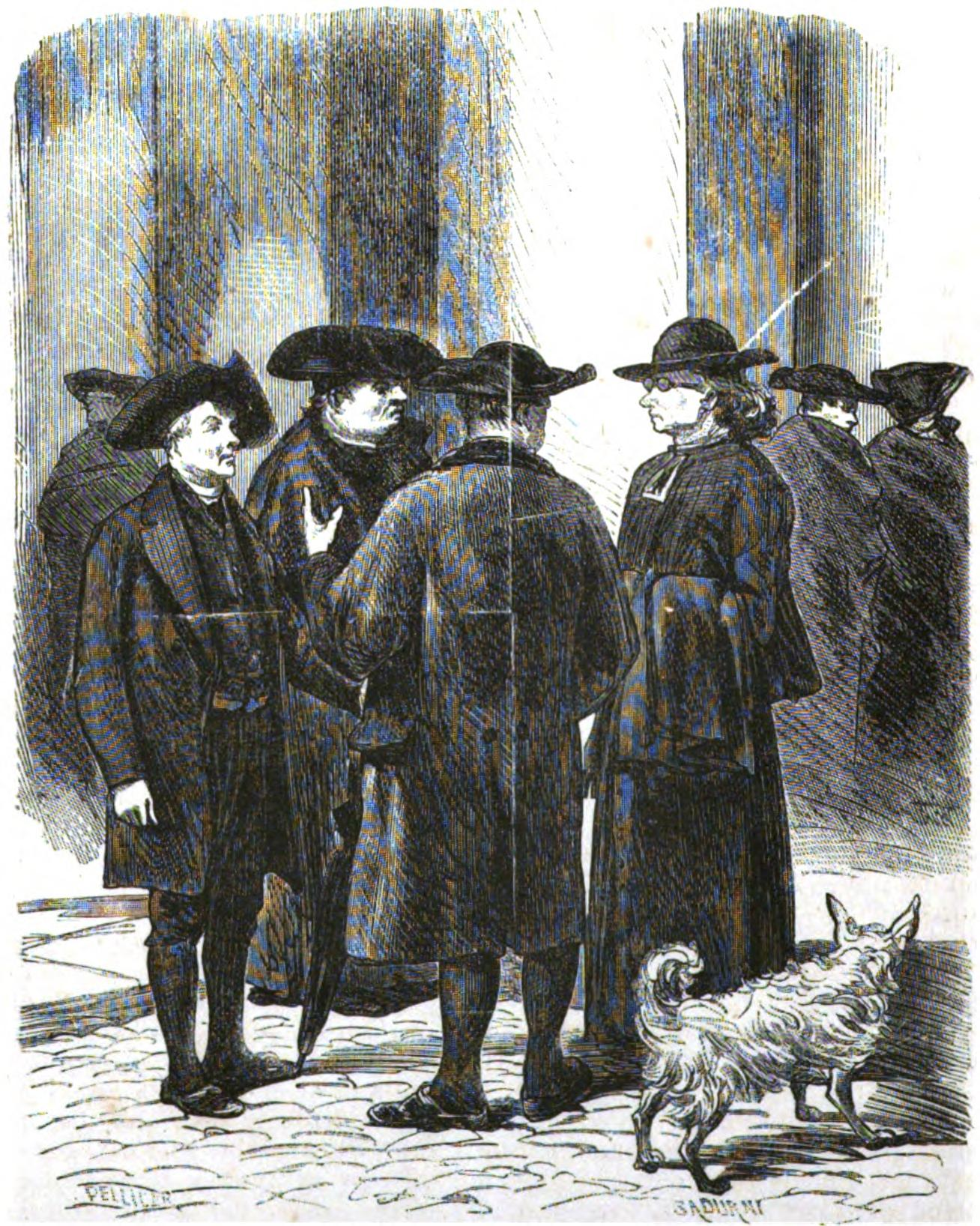
Catholic ecclesiastics from various countries gathered in Rome for the council

There was stronger opposition to the draft constitution on the nature of the church, which at first did not include the question of papal infallibility, but the majority party in the council, whose position on this matter was much stronger, brought it forward. It was decided to postpone discussion of everything in the draft except infallibility. The decree did not go forward without controversy; Cardinal Filippo Maria Guidi, Archbishop of Bologna, proposed adding that the pope is assisted by "the counsel of the bishops manifesting the tradition of the churches". Pius IX rejected Guidi's view of the bishops as witnesses to the tradition, maintaining: "I am the tradition."

On 13 July 1870, a preliminary vote on the section on infallibility was held in a general congregation: 451 voted simply in favour (placet), 88 against (non placet), and 62 in favour but on condition of some amendment (placet iuxta modum). This made evident what the outcome would be, and some 60 members of the opposition left Rome so as not to be associated with approval of the document. The final vote, with a choice only between placet and non placet, was taken on 18 July 1870, with 533 votes in favour and only 2 against defining as a dogma the infallibility of the pope when speaking ex cathedra. The two votes in opposition were cast by Bishops Aloisio Riccio and Edward Fitzgerald.

The dogmatic constitution states, in chapter 4:9, that the pope has "full and supreme power of jurisdiction over the whole Church" (chapter 3:9); and that, when he:

speaks ex cathedra, that is, when, in the exercise of his office as shepherd and teacher of all Christians, in virtue of his supreme apostolic authority, he defines a doctrine concerning faith or morals to be held by the whole Church, he possesses, by the divine assistance promised to him in blessed Peter, that infallibility which the divine Redeemer willed his Church to enjoy in defining doctrine concerning faith or morals.

None of the bishops who had argued that proclaiming the definition was inopportune refused to accept it. Some Catholics, mainly of German language and largely inspired by the historian Ignaz von Döllinger, formed the separate Old Catholic Church in protest; von Döllinger did not formally join the new group himself.

== Suspension and aftermath ==
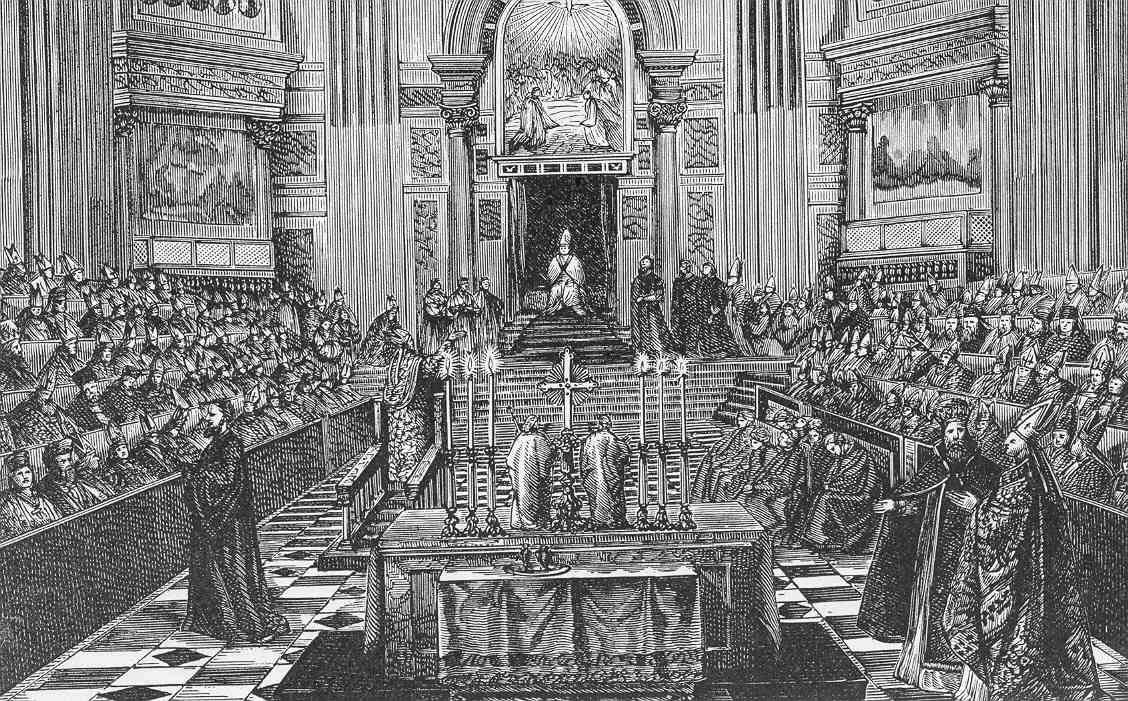
Drawing showing the First Vatican Council

Discussion of the rest of the document on the nature of the church was to continue when the bishops returned after a summer break. In the meanwhile, France declared war on Prussia, but soon was losing territory. With the swift advance of Prussian and allied South German forces in August, leading to the capture of Emperor Napoleon III at Sedan in early September, French troops protecting papal rule in Rome withdrew from the city. Italy occupied Rome on 20 September 1870, but forces stayed away from the Leonine City, and Pope Pius IX considered himself a prisoner in the Vatican.

On 20 October 1870, one month after the newly founded Kingdom of Italy had occupied Rome, Pope Pius IX issued the bull Postquam Dei munere, adjourning the council indefinitely. While some proposed to continue the council in the Belgian city of Mechlin, it was never reconvened. Various schemata (documents in the process of being drafted and debated) remained unfinished, such as two schemata on nature of the Church: Supremi pastoris, prepared by the Council's Theological-Dogmatic Preparatory Commission, and Tametsi Deus, drafted by the German theologian Joseph Kleutgen SJ.

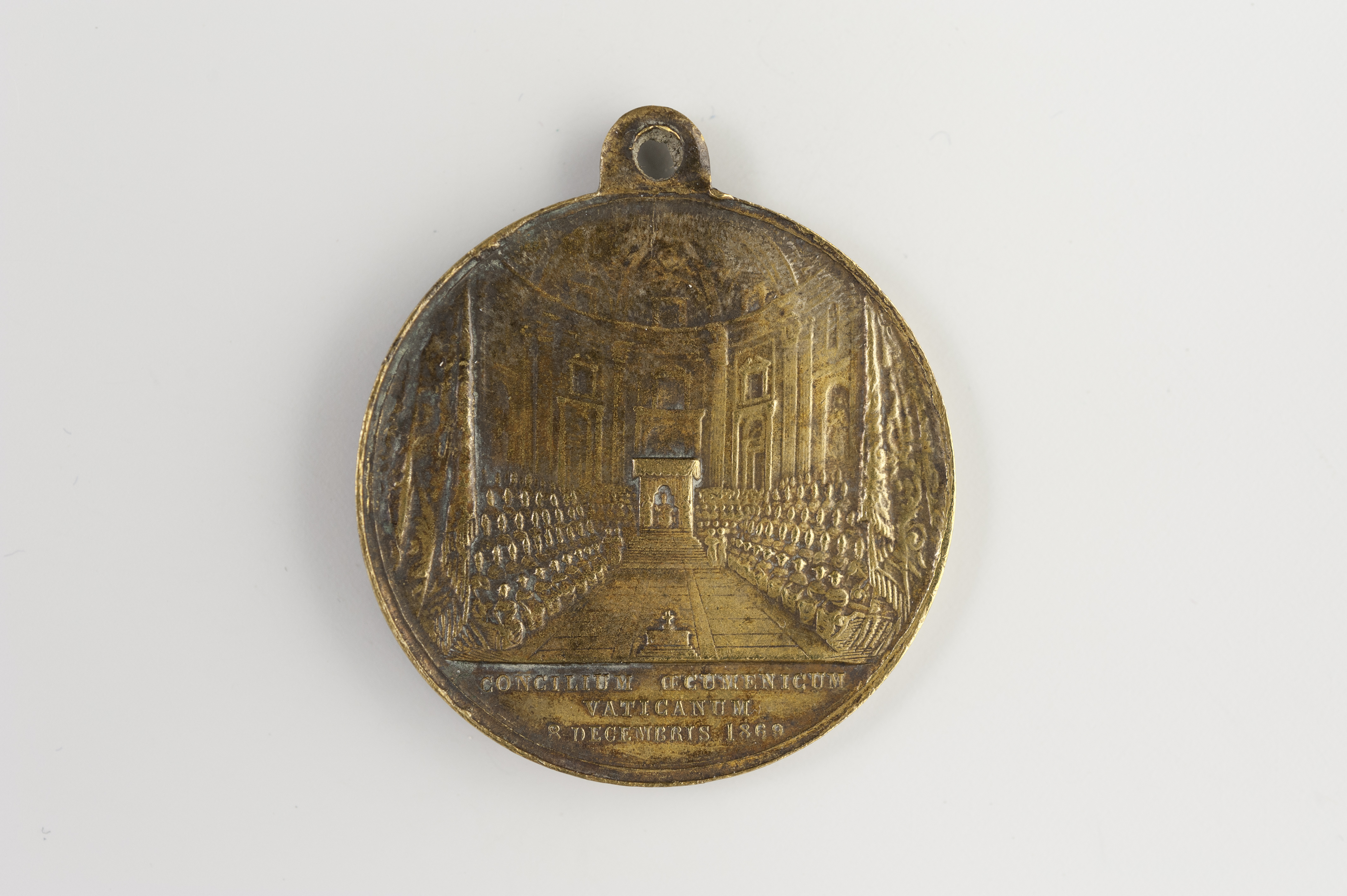
Medal marking Vatican I

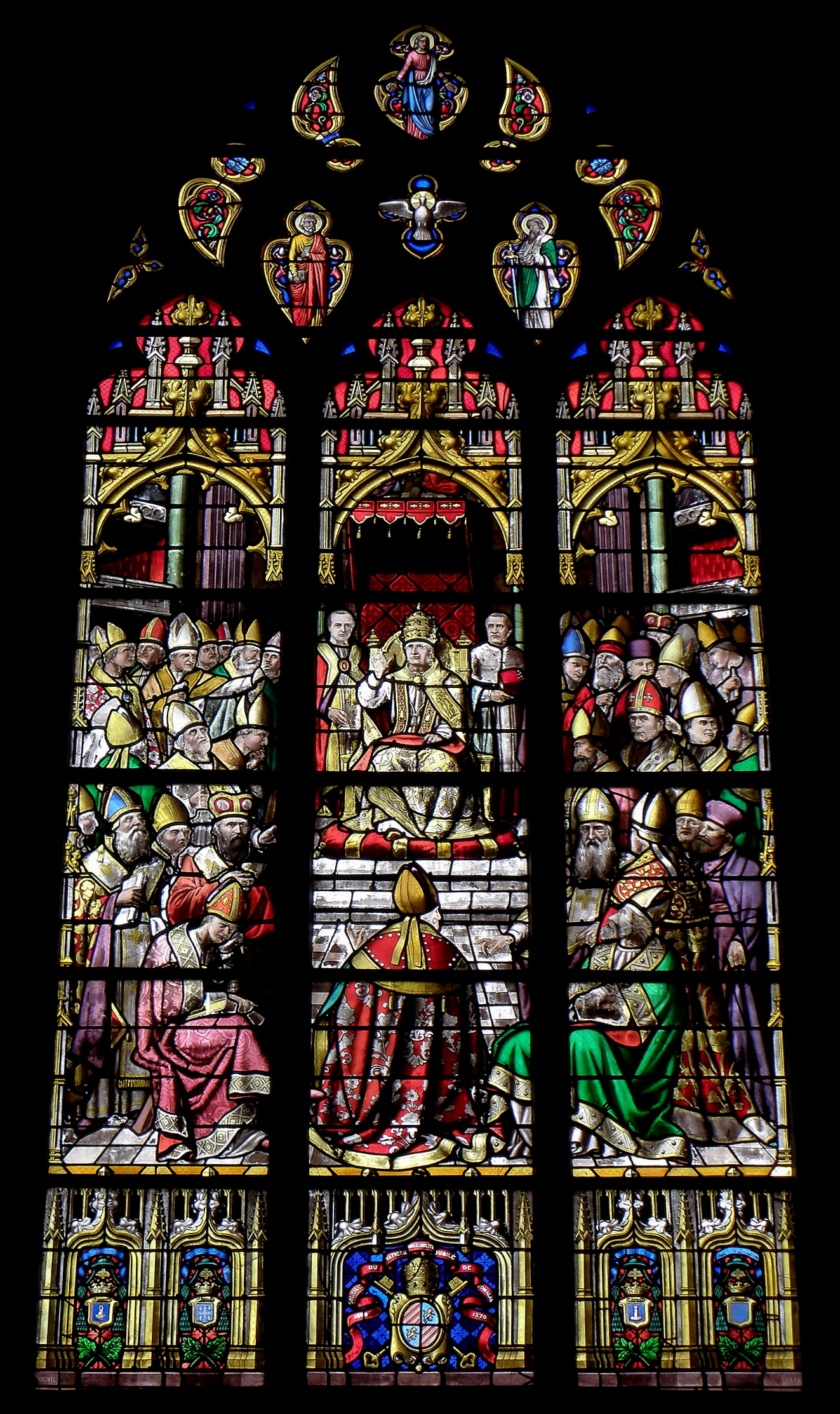
Window in Domalain, Brittany, showing the Proclamation of Papal Infallibility

In reaction to the political implications of the doctrine of infallibility on the sovereignty of secular states, some of the European kingdoms and republics took rapid action against the Catholic Church. The Austrian Empire annulled the Concordat of 1855. In the Kingdom of Prussia, the anti-Catholic Kulturkampf broke out immediately afterwards, and in the French Third Republic the synod so accentuated the power of ultramontanism (an emphasis on the powers of the pope), that Republican France took steps to curb it by eventually getting to revoking the Concordat of 1801 in 1905, and therefore completely separating the Church from the state.

== Controversies and opposition ==
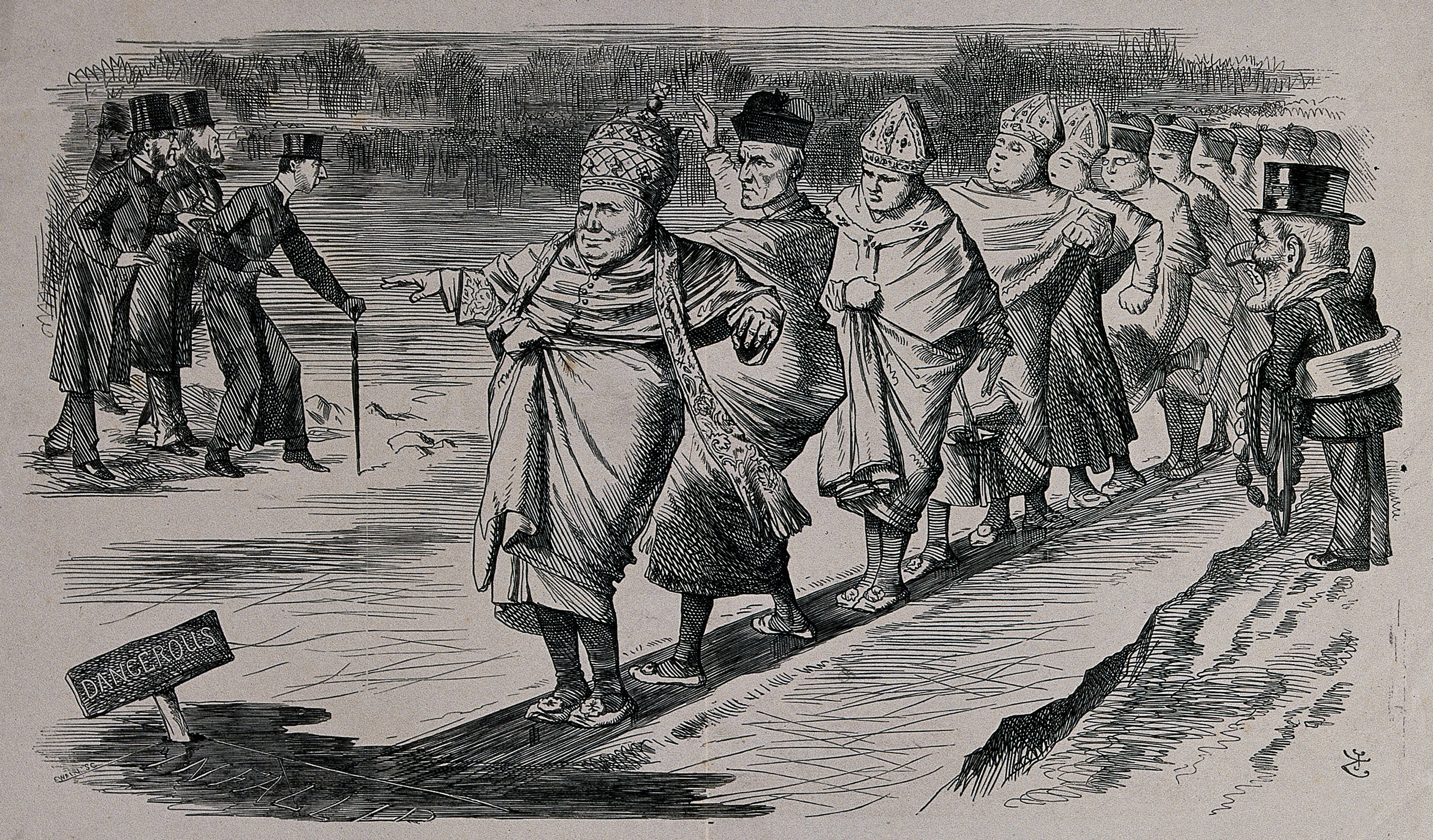
Satirical cartoon by John Tenniel and Joseph Swain, showing the Pope leading a line of Catholic clerics along a plank placed on thin ice. A group of Anglo-Catholics at left are also considering venturing onto the dangerous ice.

The dogma of papal infallibility raised considerable opposition in some liberal theological circles in the Netherlands, Austria, Germany and Switzerland; the most notable theologian opposing the formulation of the dogma was Ignaz von Döllinger, who was excommunicated in 1871 by Archbishop Gregor von Scherr of Munich and Freising, for refusing to accept the council's decision.

=== Old Catholic schism ===
Following the council's decision, a minority of clergy and laity opposed to the newly proclaimed dogma united with the Jansenists, which had maintained a somewhat precarious existence in separation from Rome since the 18th century but had preserved an episcopal succession recognized by Rome as valid though illicit. The first consecration of the new order was that of Joseph H. Reinkens, who was made bishop in Germany by a sympathetic Jansenist bishop Johannes Heykamp of Utrecht. Such new group referred to itself as the Old Catholic Church (or the Christian Catholic Church in Switzerland). Old Catholics in Europe united into the Union of Utrecht in 1889, which entered into full communion with the Anglican Communion in 1931 through the Bonn Agreement.

The Union of Utrecht still exists to this day and includes the Old Catholic Church of the Netherlands, the Catholic Diocese of the Old Catholics in Germany, the Old Catholic Church of Austria, the Old Catholic Church of the Czech Republic, the Polish-Catholic Church of the Republic of Poland and the Christian Catholic Church of Switzerland. The Union of Scranton, formed by more theologically conservative Old Catholics, was formed in 2008 and currently includes the Polish National Catholic Church and the Nordic Catholic Church.

=== Masonic Anti-Council ===
Radical democrat Giuseppe Ricciardi, with the assistance of Freemasons, Spiritists, and feminists, organized an Anticoncilio of freethinkers to take place in Naples on the same days as Vatican I. This meeting was dissolved by Italian police after just two days.

== See also ==
- Second Vatican Council
