= Papacy during the Renaissance =

Period of papal history (1417–1500s)

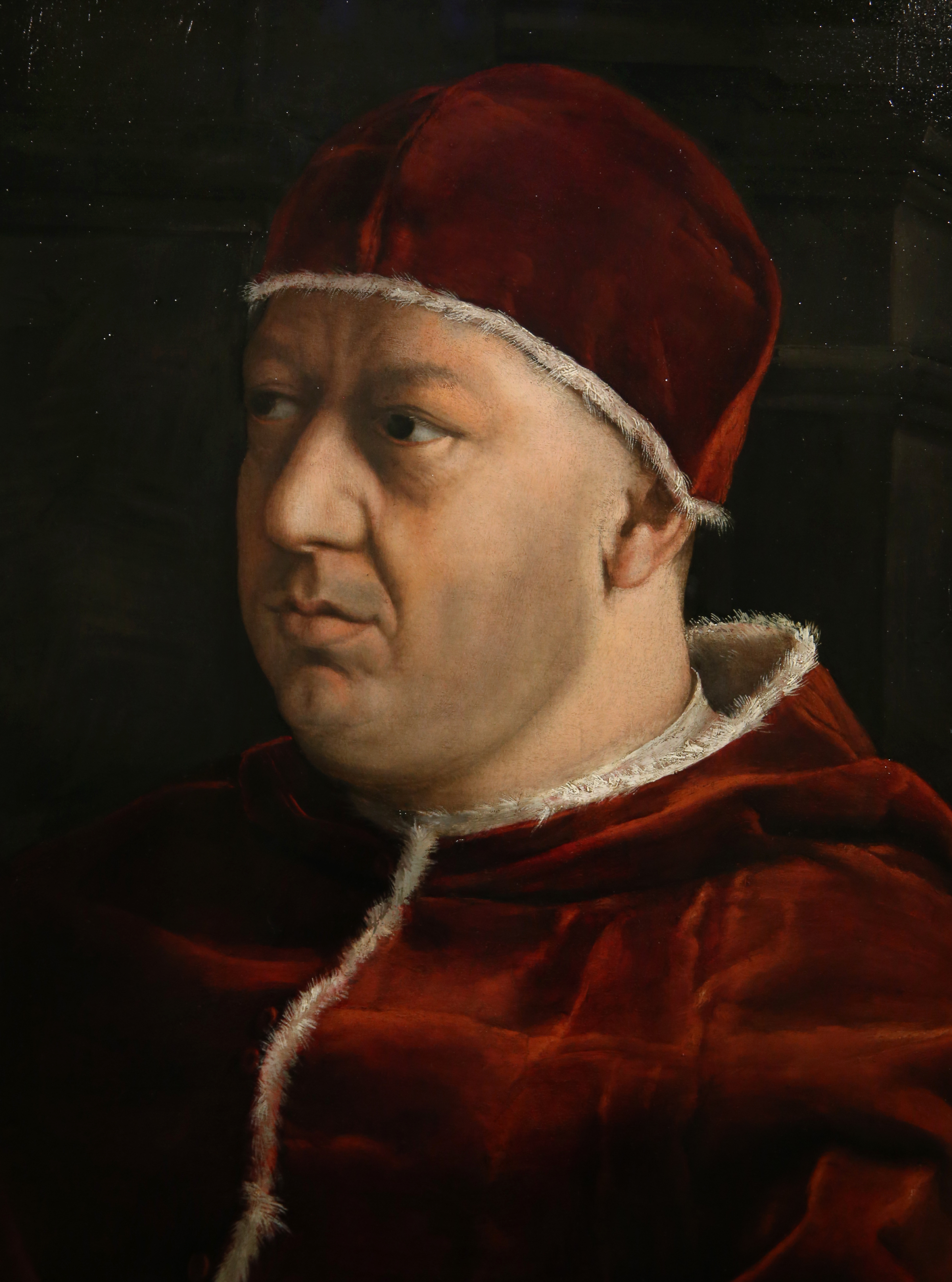
Pope Leo X, the quintessential Renaissance pope

The Renaissance period in papal history was between the Western Schism and the Reformation. From the election of Pope Martin V of the Council of Constance in 1417 to the Reformation in the 16th century, Western Christianity was largely free from schism as well as significant disputed papal claimants. There were many important divisions over the direction of the religion, but these were resolved through the then-settled procedures of the papal conclave.

The popes of this period were a reflection of the College of Cardinals that elected them. The College was dominated by cardinal-nephews (relatives of the popes that elevated them), crown-cardinals (representatives of the Catholic monarchies of Europe), and members of the powerful Italian families. There were two popes each from the House of Borgia, House of della Rovere, and House of Medici during this period. The wealthy popes and cardinals increasingly patronized Renaissance art and architecture, (re)building the landmarks of Rome from the ground up.

The Papal States began to resemble a modern nation-state during this period, and the papacy took an increasingly active role in European wars and diplomacy. Popes were more frequently called upon to arbitrate disputes between competing colonial powers than to resolve complicated theological disputes. To the extent that this period is relevant to modern Catholic dogma, it is in the area of papal supremacy. None of these popes have been canonized as a saint, or even regarded as Blessed or Venerable.

== History ==
In 1420, the papacy returned to Rome under Pope Martin V. Generally speaking, the Renaissance popes who followed him prioritized the temporal interests of the Papal States in Italian politics. In addition to being the head of the Holy Roman Church, the Pope became one of Italy's most powerful secular rulers, signing treaties with other sovereigns and fighting wars. In practice though, much of the territory of the Papal States was only nominally controlled by the Pope, and in actuality was ruled by minor princes. Control was often contested; indeed it took until the 16th century for the Pope to have any genuine control over all his territories.

Numerous popes during this period used Papal finances and armies to enforce and expand upon the longstanding territorial and property claims of the papacy as an institution, e.g. Pope Julius II and the League of Cambrai; Pope Clement VII and the War of the League of Cognac. Before the Western Schism the papacy derived much of its revenue from the "vigorous exercise of its spiritual office;" however, during the Renaissance, popes were largely dependent on financial revenue from the Papal States themselves. In attempting to increase the territory of the Papal States, Pope Julius II became known as "the Warrior Pope" for his ongoing military campaigns. He continued the consolidation of power in the Papal States and continued the process of rebuilding Rome physically. His most prominent architectural project was the rebuilding of St. Peter's Basilica.

Certain Renaissance popes used papal finances and armies to enrich themselves and their families; for example, Pope Alexander VI used the power of Papal patronage to fund his son Cesare Borgia's wars throughout Italy. Likewise, Pope Leo X embroiled papal armies in fighting the protracted War of Urbino, an effort to secure the Pope's nephew Lorenzo II de Medici's rule over that city. The War of Urbino contributed, in large part, to driving the papacy into deep debt.

With ambitious temporal agendas ranging from military campaigns to the arts, Renaissance popes widened the scope of their sources of revenue. Famously, Pope Leo X expanded the sale of indulgences and bureaucratic and ecclesiastical offices to finance the rebuilding of St. Peter’s Basilica. Controversy over these practices reached their zenith in 1517, when Martin Luther initiated the Protestant Reformation, ultimately splintering Western Christendom into many denominations.

The popes of this period ruled as absolute monarchs, but unlike their European peers, they were not hereditary rulers, so a plurality of them promoted their family interests through nepotism (The word nepotism originally referred to the practice of Popes creating cardinal-nephews, when it appeared in the English language about 1669.). According to Duffy, "the inevitable outcome of all of this was a creation of a wealthy cardinalatial class, with strong dynastic connections." For example, in 1517, Pope Leo X made his cardinal-nephew Giulio de Medici vice-chancellor of the Holy Roman Church (second-in-command); and ultimately, following the former's death in 1521, in 1523 the latter became Pope Clement VII.

According to Eamon Duffy, "the Renaissance papacy invokes images of a Hollywood spectacular, all decadence and drag. Contemporaries viewed Renaissance Rome as we now view Nixon's Washington, a city of expense-account whores and political graft, where everything and everyone had a price, where nothing and nobody could be trusted. The popes themselves seemed to set the tone." Exemplary of the time and place, Pope Leo X is said to have famously remarked: "Since God has given us the Papacy, let us enjoy it." Several of the Renaissance popes took mistresses, fathered children, engaged in intrigue, and even murder. For example, Alexander VI had four acknowledged children, including the infamous murderer Cesare Borgia. Not all historical commentators take such a grim view of the Renaissance papacy though, noting that the "misdeeds (largely exaggerated) of some of the pontiffs of this era have caused many people to dismiss all of the “Renaissance Popes” as corrupt and worldly when, in fact, their ranks included men who were personally upright, modest and virtuous." The author goes on to cite Clement VII as "a very upright man, devout and not at all licentious, lavish or cruel as so many of his fellow “Renaissance Popes” are often thought of as being;" likewise, he praises Adrian VI's "holiness and moral integrity."

The Renaissance papacy began to decline when the Protestant Reformation splintered Western Christianity into denominations, and as nation-states (e.g. France, England), began asserting varying degrees of control over the Church in their territories. Other factors contributed as well; for example, by the early 1520s, after years of immoderate spending, the Holy Roman Church was nearing bankruptcy; in 1527, the armies of Holy Roman Emperor Charles V sacked Rome, causing the city's population to dwindle from 55,000 to 10,000 in a single year; and in 1533, Henry VIII of England broke away from the Catholic Church so that he could marry Anne Boleyn, initiating the English Reformation. Cumulatively, these events changed the complexion of the Church, moving it away from the humanistic values exemplified by Popes like Leo X and Clement VII, toward the religious orthodoxy that would become synonymous with the Counter-Reformation, and Roman Inquisition. Following the Council of Trent in 1545, the humanism once encouraged by the Renaissance papacy came to be regarded as against the teachings of the Church.

== Theology ==
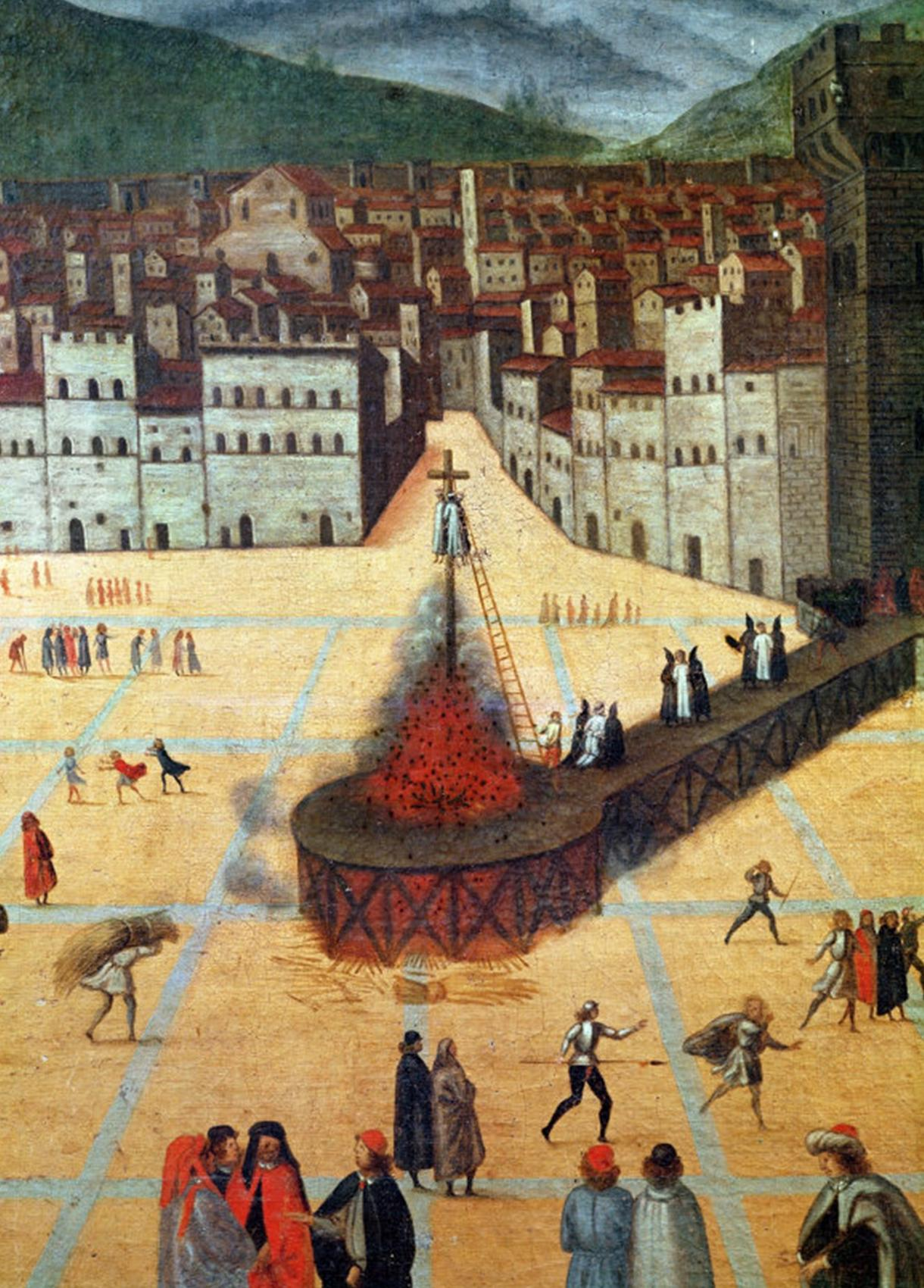
The execution of Savonarola

The "inquisitorial machinery" to deal with heresy remained largely unchanged from the thirteenth century. The two main movements unsuccessfully suppressed during this period were John Wycliffe's Lollardy and Jan Hus's Hussitism. Voices critical of the worldliness of the papacy—such as Savonarola in Florence—were excommunicated. Critics such as Desiderius Erasmus, who remained committed to reform rather than schism, were treated more favorably. The revival of Greek literature during this period made Platonism fashionable again in Catholic intellectual circles.

This was a period of declining religiosity among popes. Although Adrian VI said mass every day for the year he was pope, there is no evidence that his two predecessors—Julius II and Leo X—ever celebrated mass at all.

The reforms of the Council of Constance were unambitious and unenforced. Conciliarism—a movement to assert the authority of ecumenical councils over popes—was also defeated; papal supremacy was maintained and strengthened at the expense of the papacy's moral prestige. The role of the College of Cardinals in theological and temporal policy making also declined during this period. According to Duffy, "the one place where the cardinals were supreme was in Conclave."

The perceived abuses of this period, such as the selling of indulgences, were piled upon pre-existing theological differences and calls for reform, culminating in the Protestant Reformation. Leo X and Adrian VI "failed utterly to grasp the seriousness" of the support of Martin Luther in Germany, and their response to the rise of Protestantism was ineffective.

== Art and architecture ==
Because the popes had been in Avignon or divided by schism since 1309, Rome remained architecturally underdeveloped from both a utilitarian and artistic perspective. According to Duffy, "Rome had no industries except pilgrimage, no function except as the pope's capital." The patronage of arts and architecture was both a matter of papal policy – to increase the prestige of the institution as a whole—and the personal preferences of individual popes. Pope Leo X is well known for his patronage of Raphael, whose paintings played a large role in the redecoration of the Vatican. Pope Sixtus IV initiated a major drive to redesign and rebuild Rome, widening the streets and destroying the crumbling ruins, commissioning the Sistine Chapel, and summoning many artists from other Italian city-states. Pope Nicholas V founded the Vatican Library.

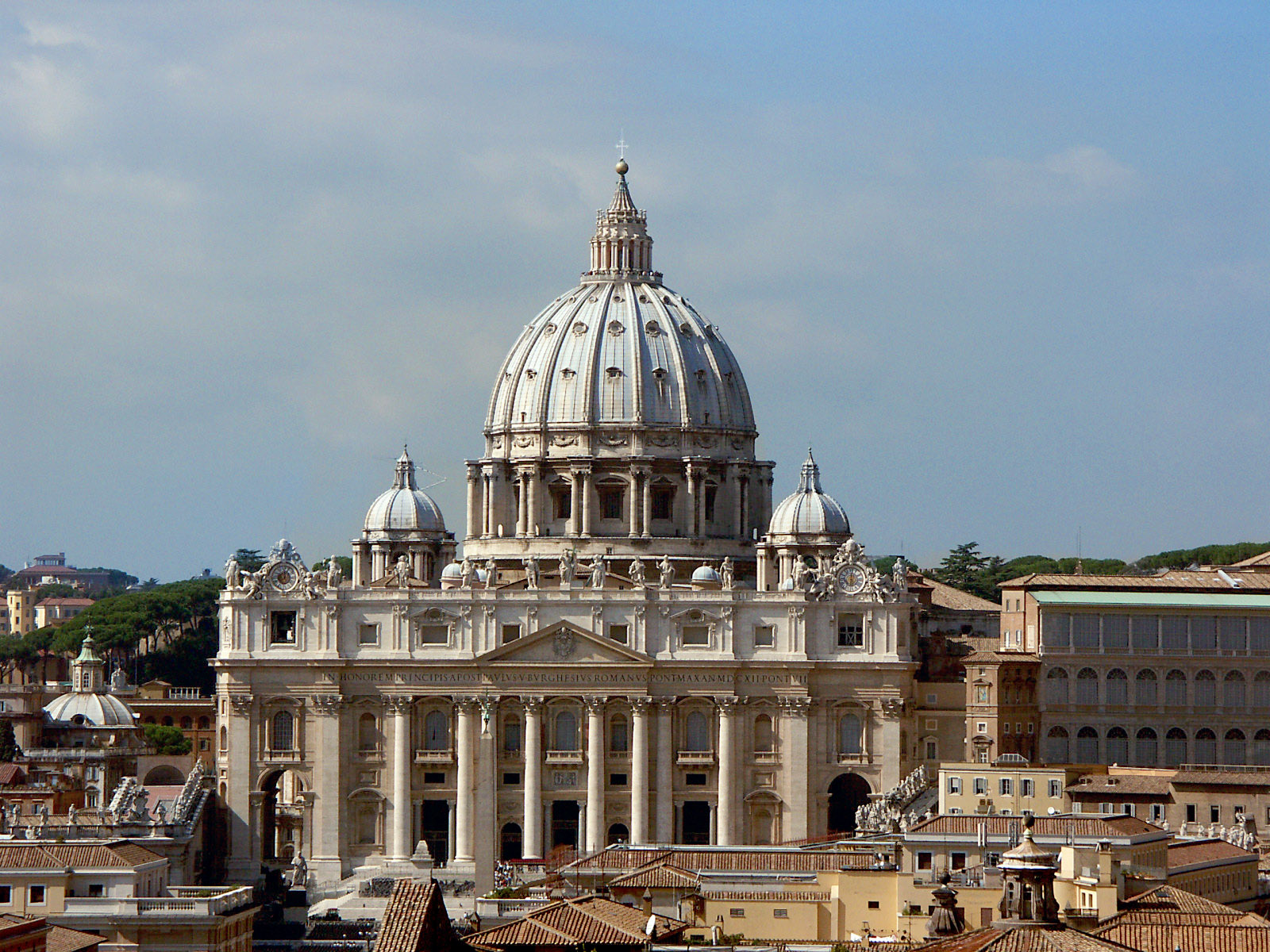
The rebuilding of St. Peter's Basilica began in 1506

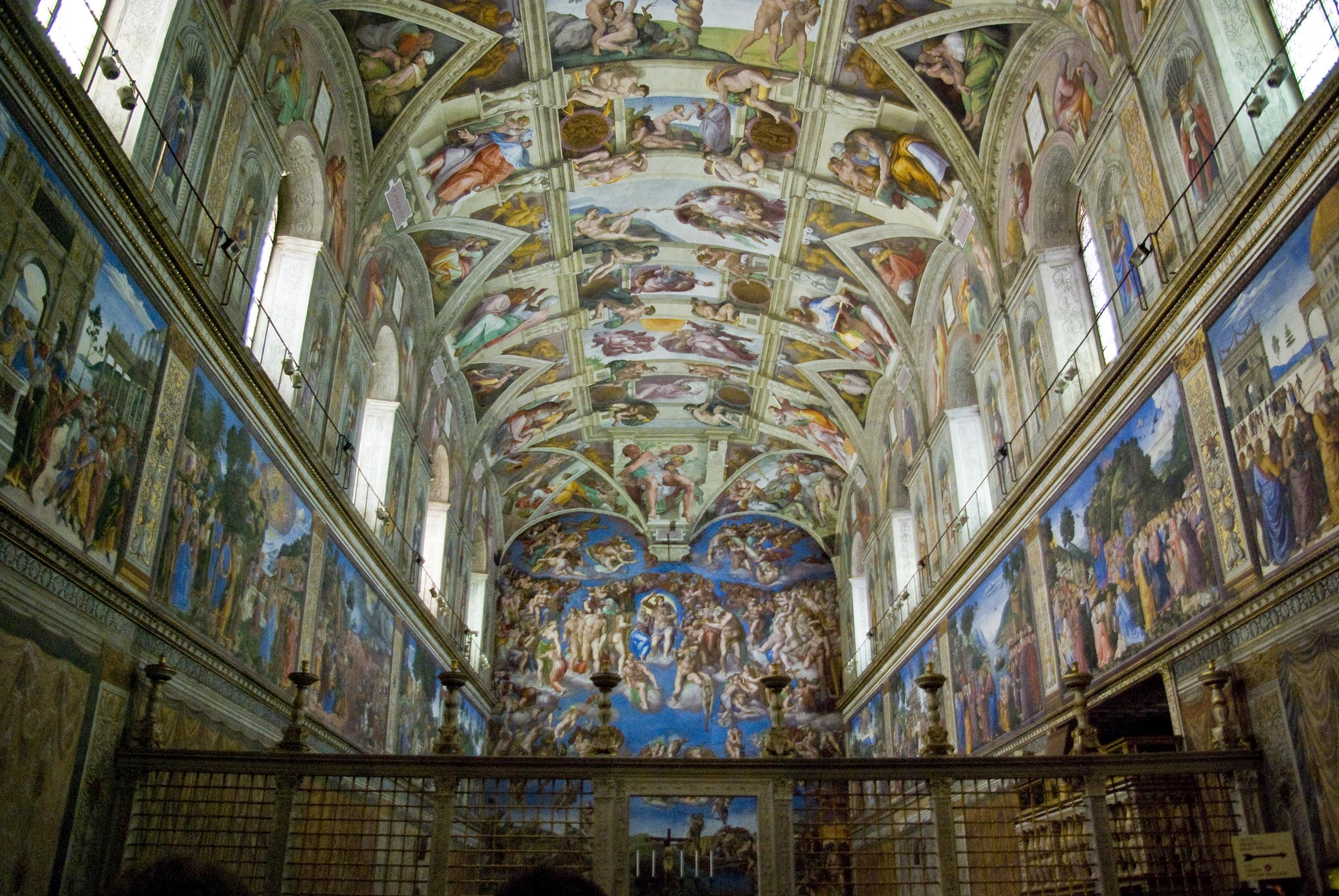
The Sistine Chapel was painted between 1481 and 1512

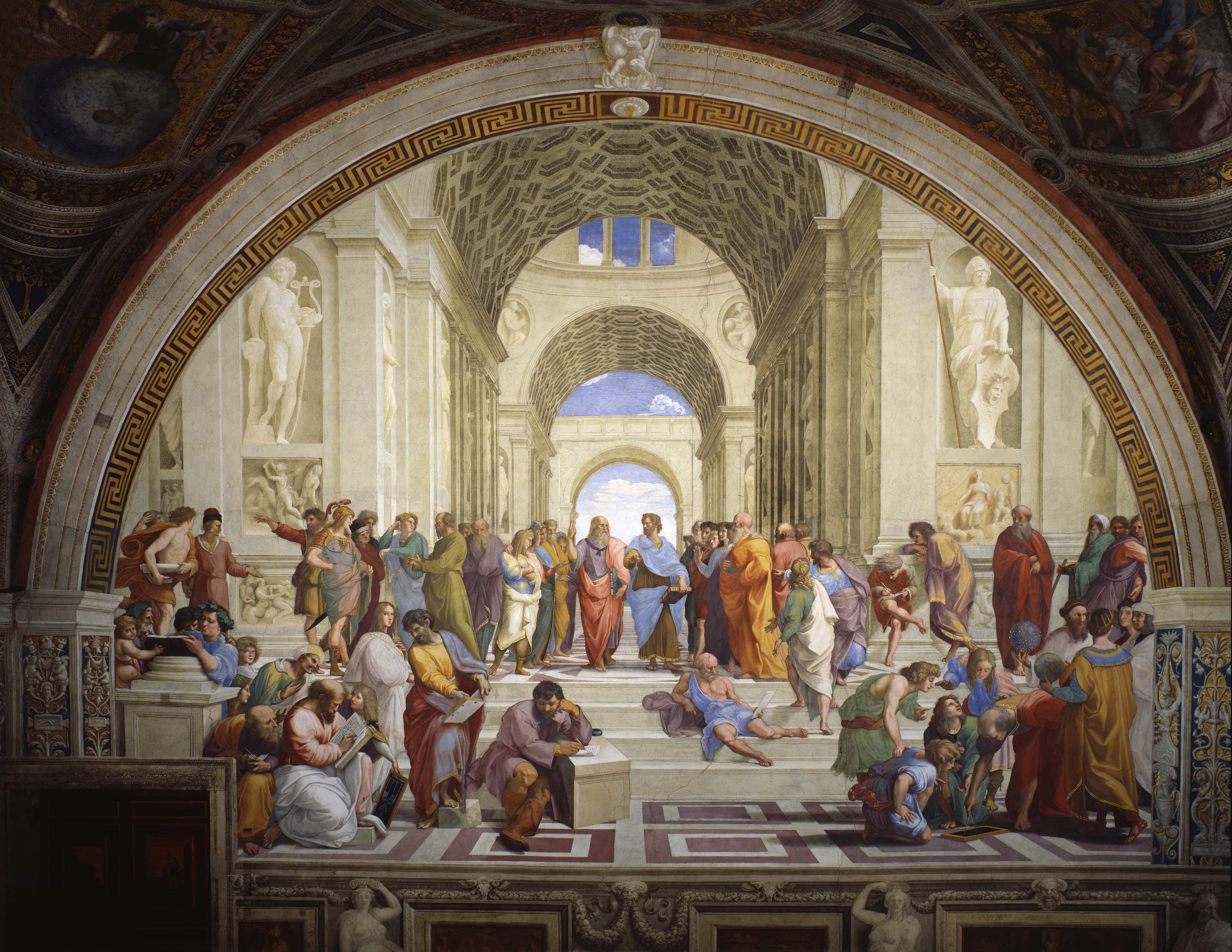
The School of Athens (1509–1511) from the Raphael Rooms

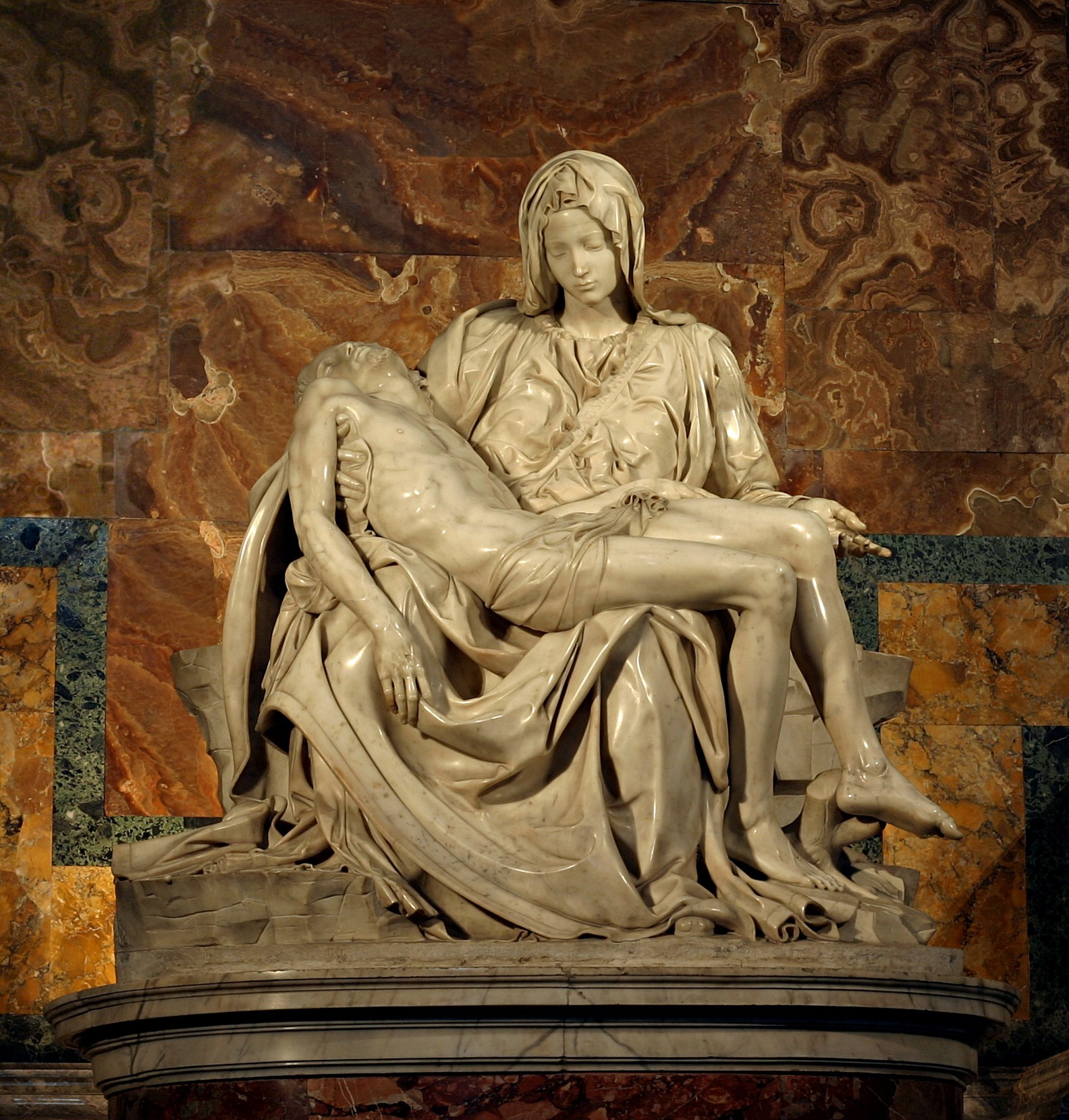
Michelangelo's Pietà, completed 1499

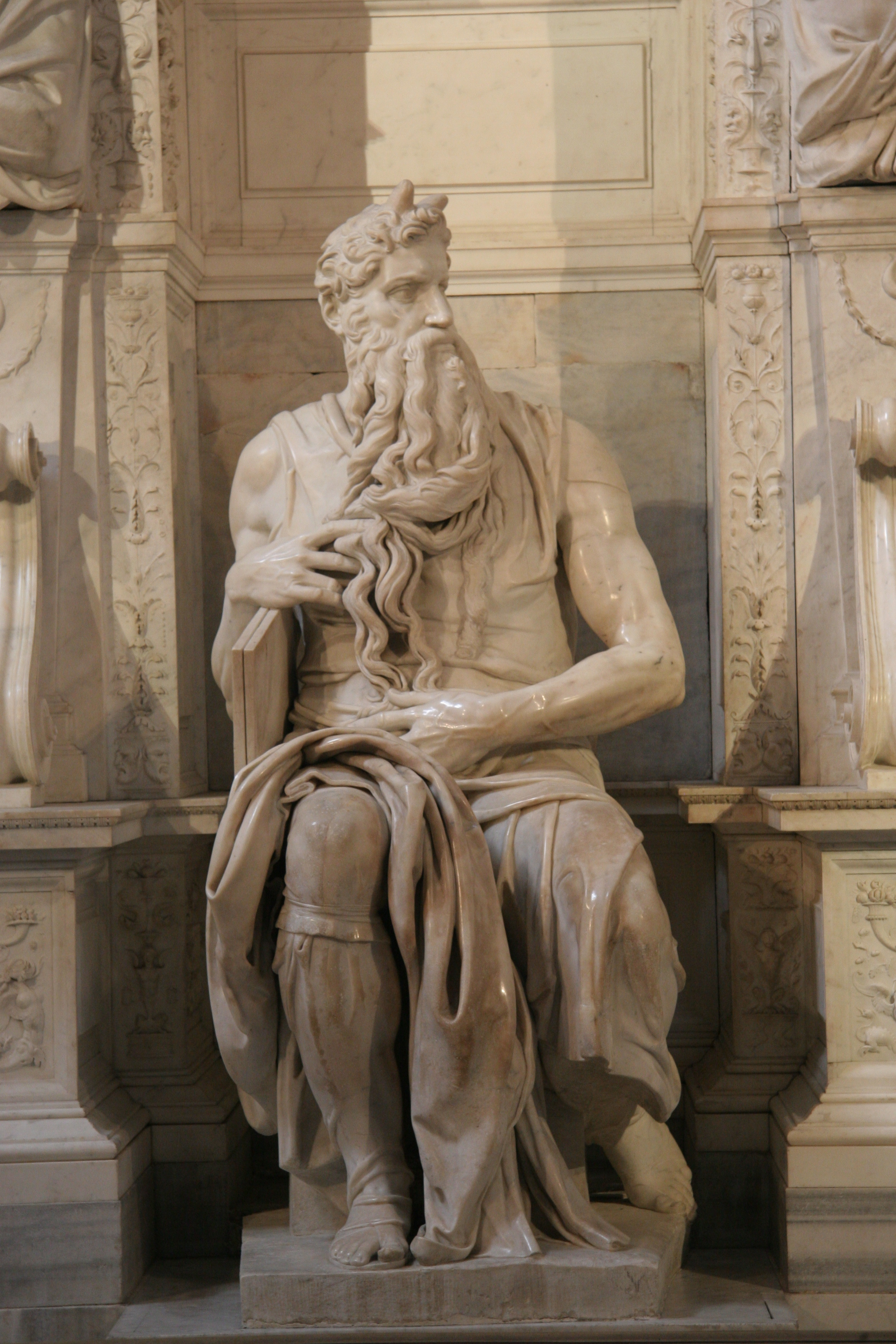
Julius II commissioned Michelangelo's Moses (1513–1515) for his tomb

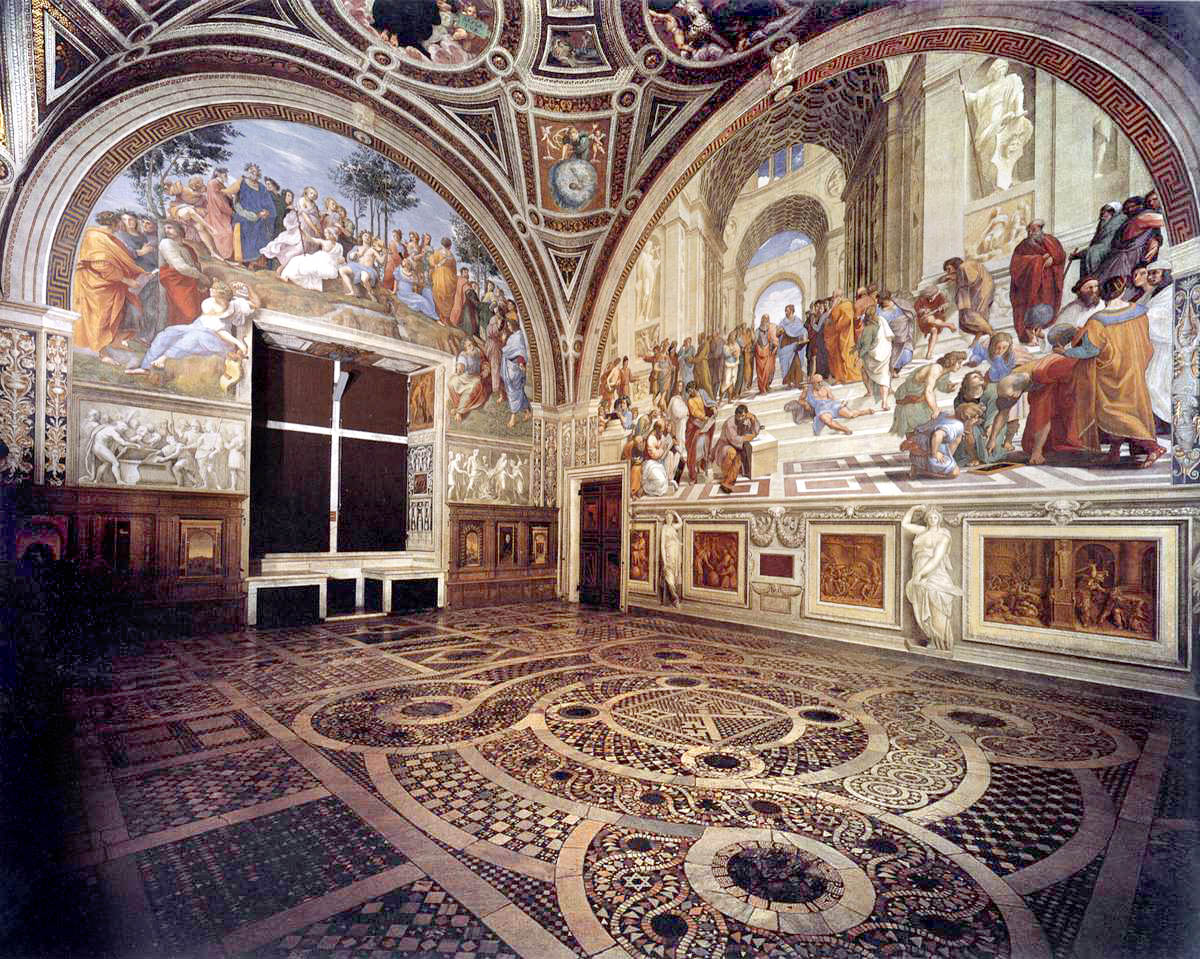
The Stanza della Segnatura by Raphael, a suite of apartments for Pope Julius II

== Overview ==
The period from end of the Western Schism in 1417 to the Council of Trent (1534–1563) is a rough approximation used by scholars to date the papacy of the Renaissance and separate it from the era of the Counter-Reformation.

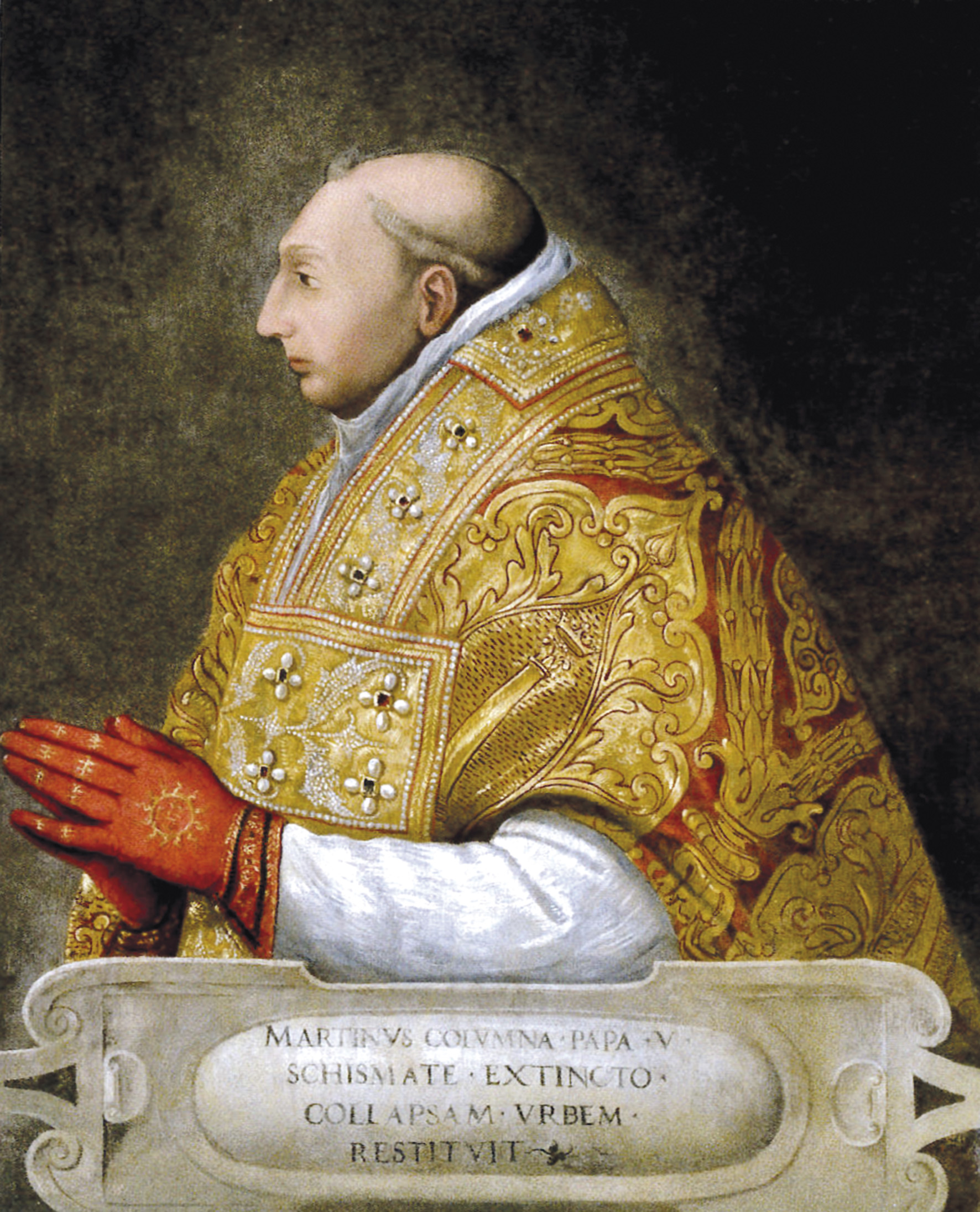
Pope Martin V (1417–1431)

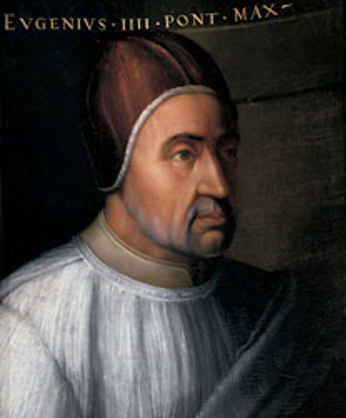
Pope Eugene IV (1431–1447)

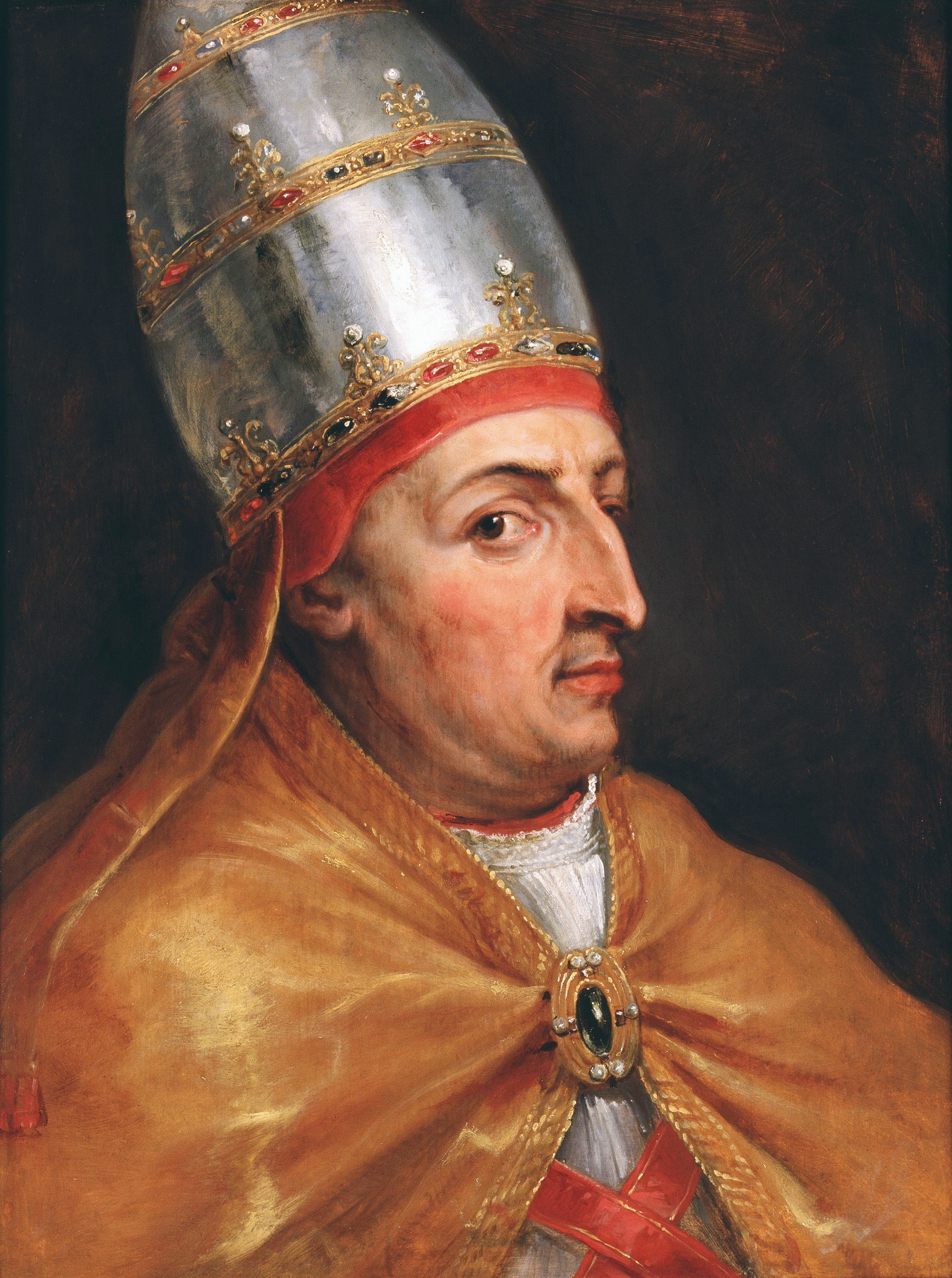
Pope Nicholas V (1447–1455)

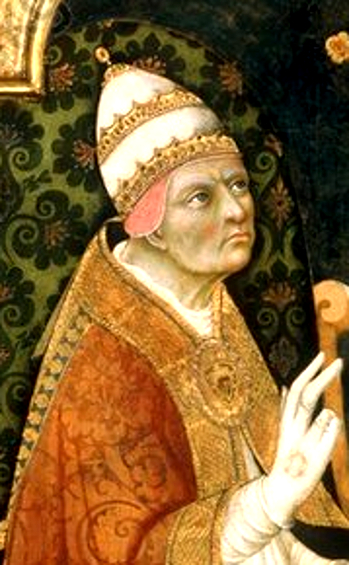
Pope Callixtus III (1455–1458)

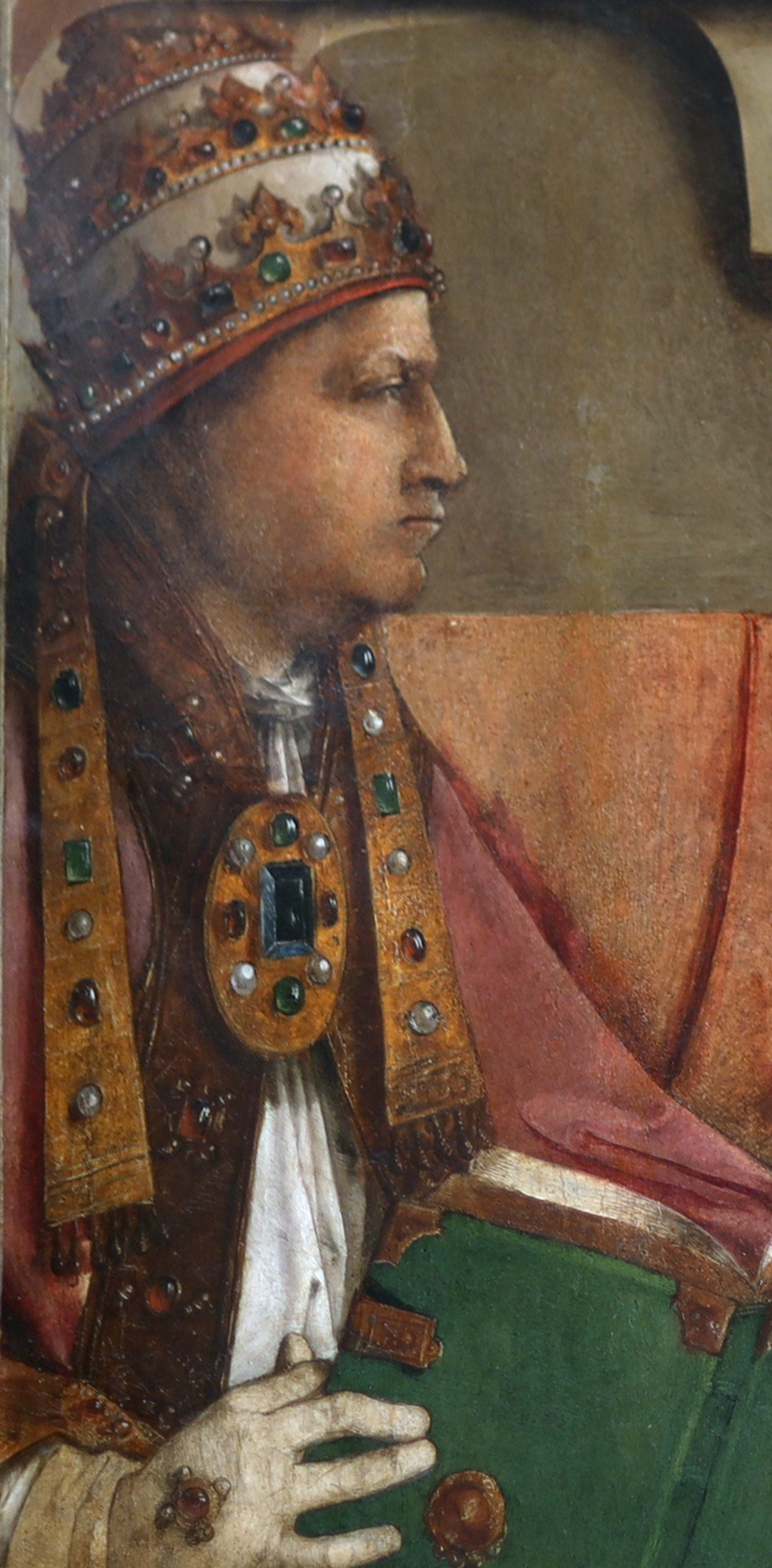
Pope Pius II (1458–1464)

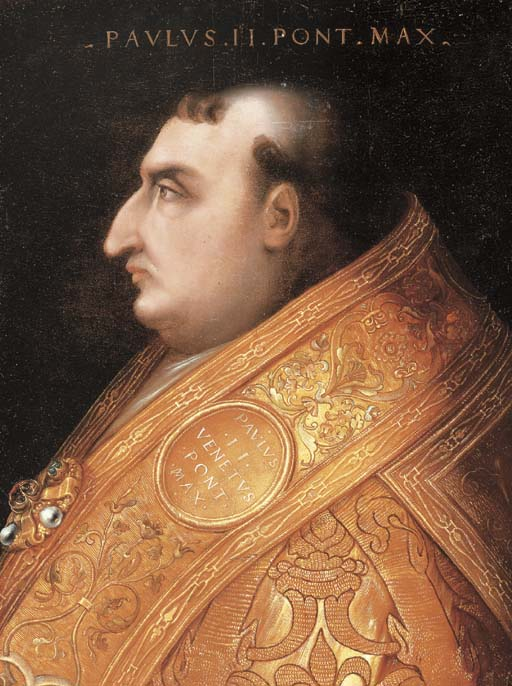
Pope Paul II (1464–1471)

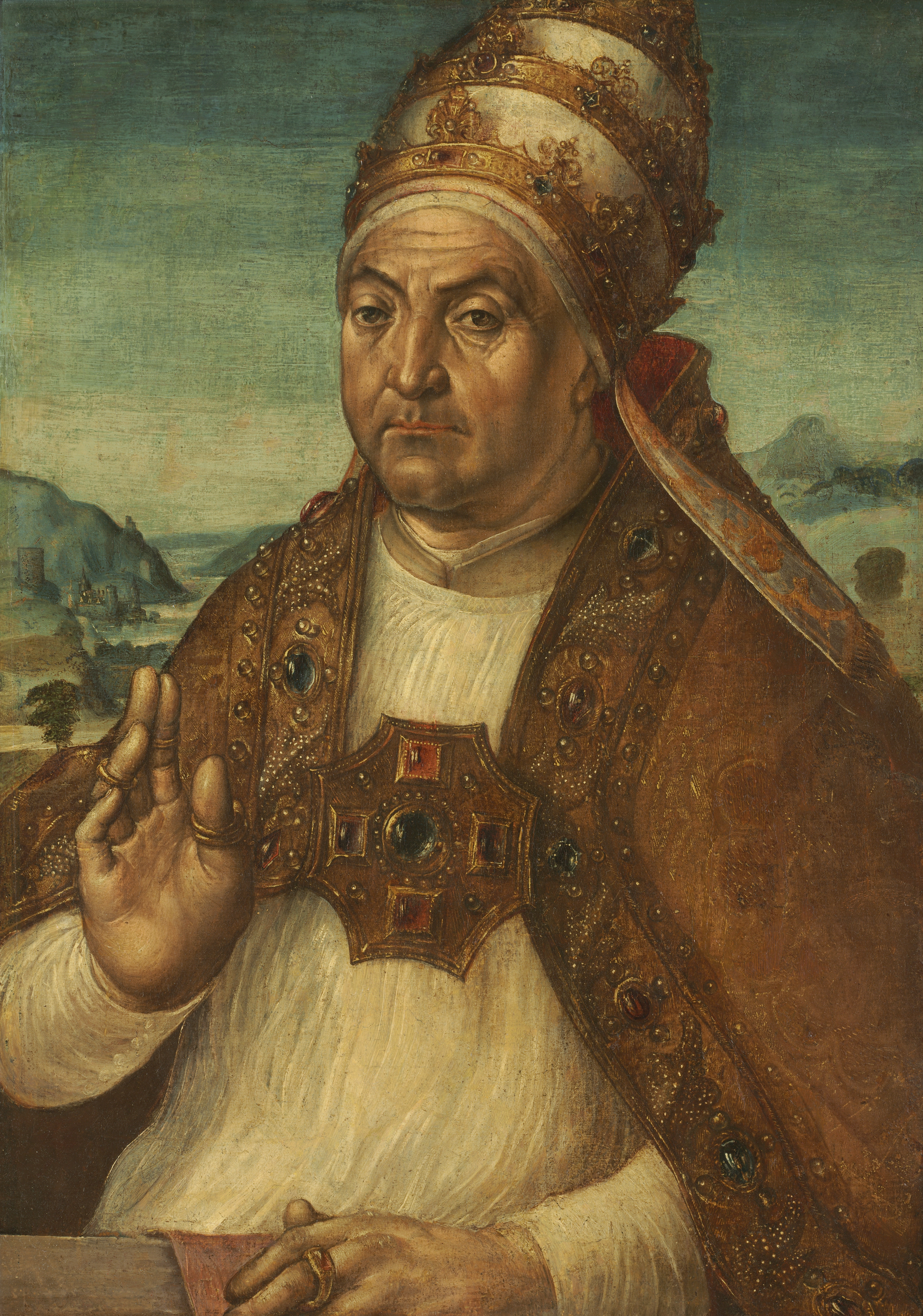
Pope Sixtus IV (1471–1484)

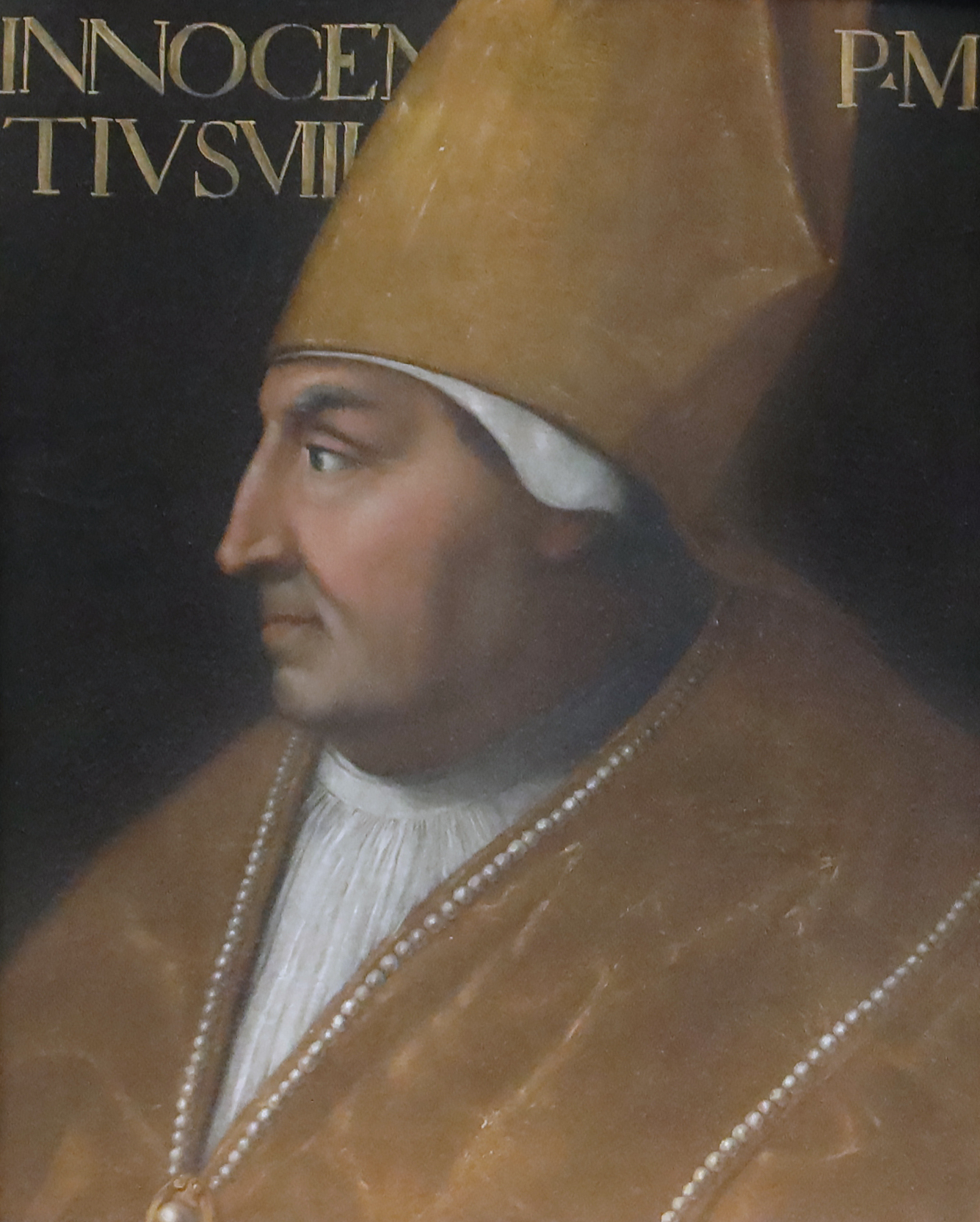
Pope Innocent VIII (1484–1492)

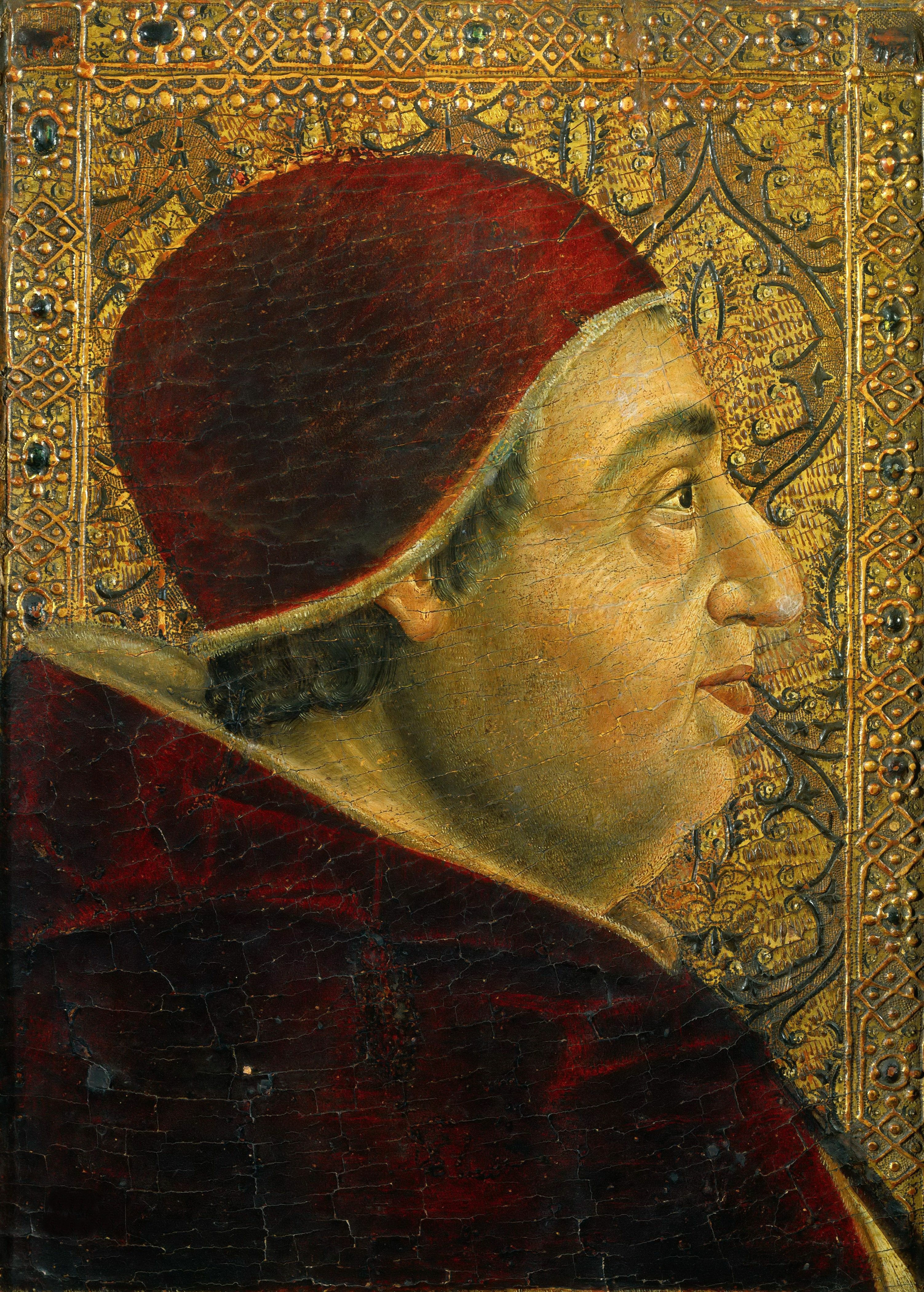
Pope Alexander VI (1492–1503)

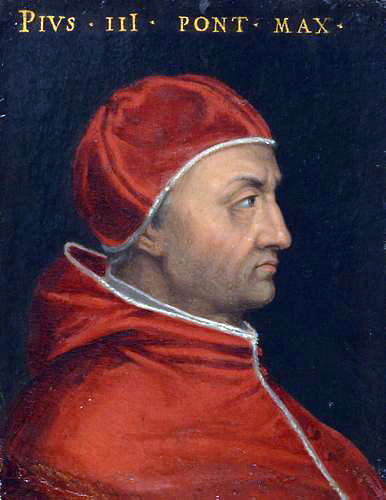
Pope Pius III (1503)

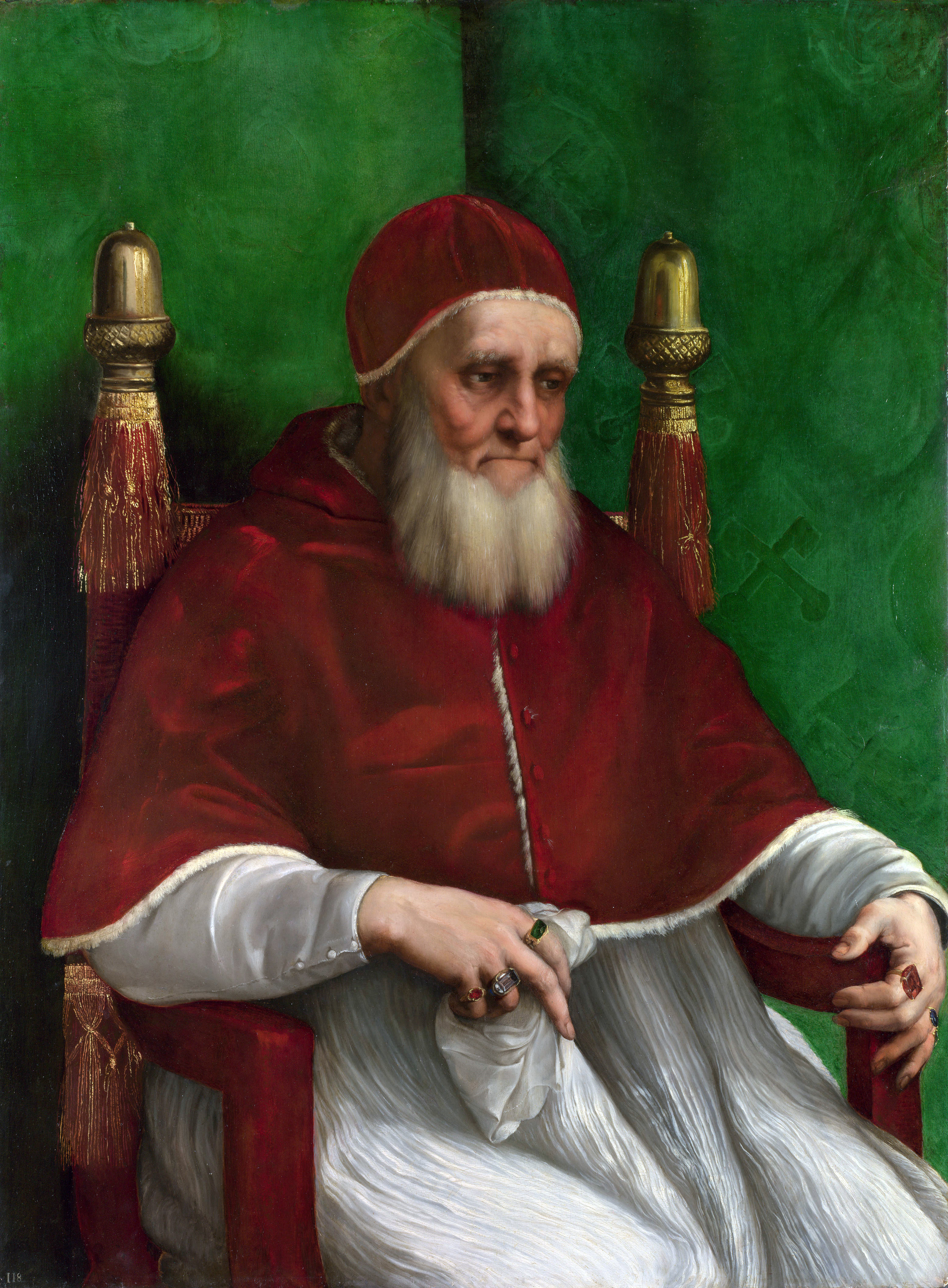
Pope Julius II (1503–1513)

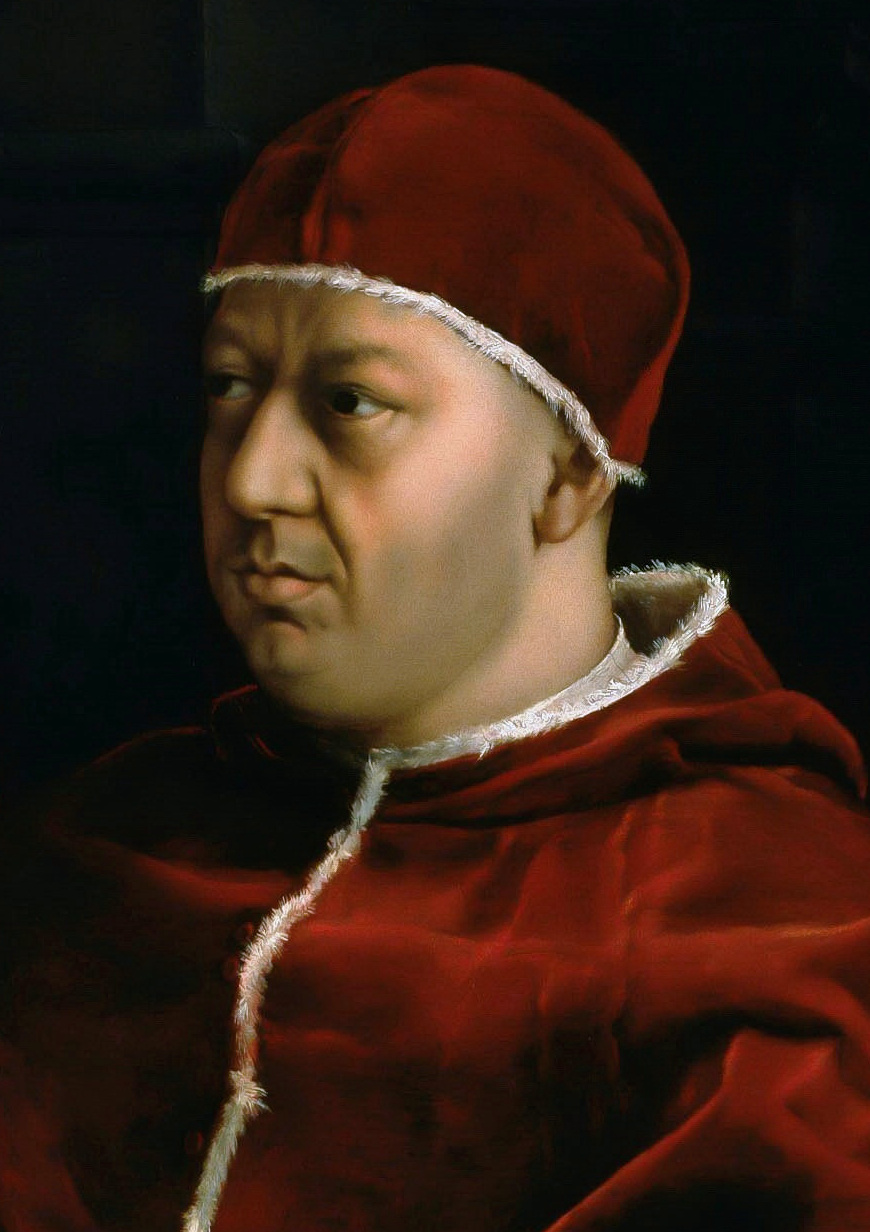
Pope Leo X (1513–1521)

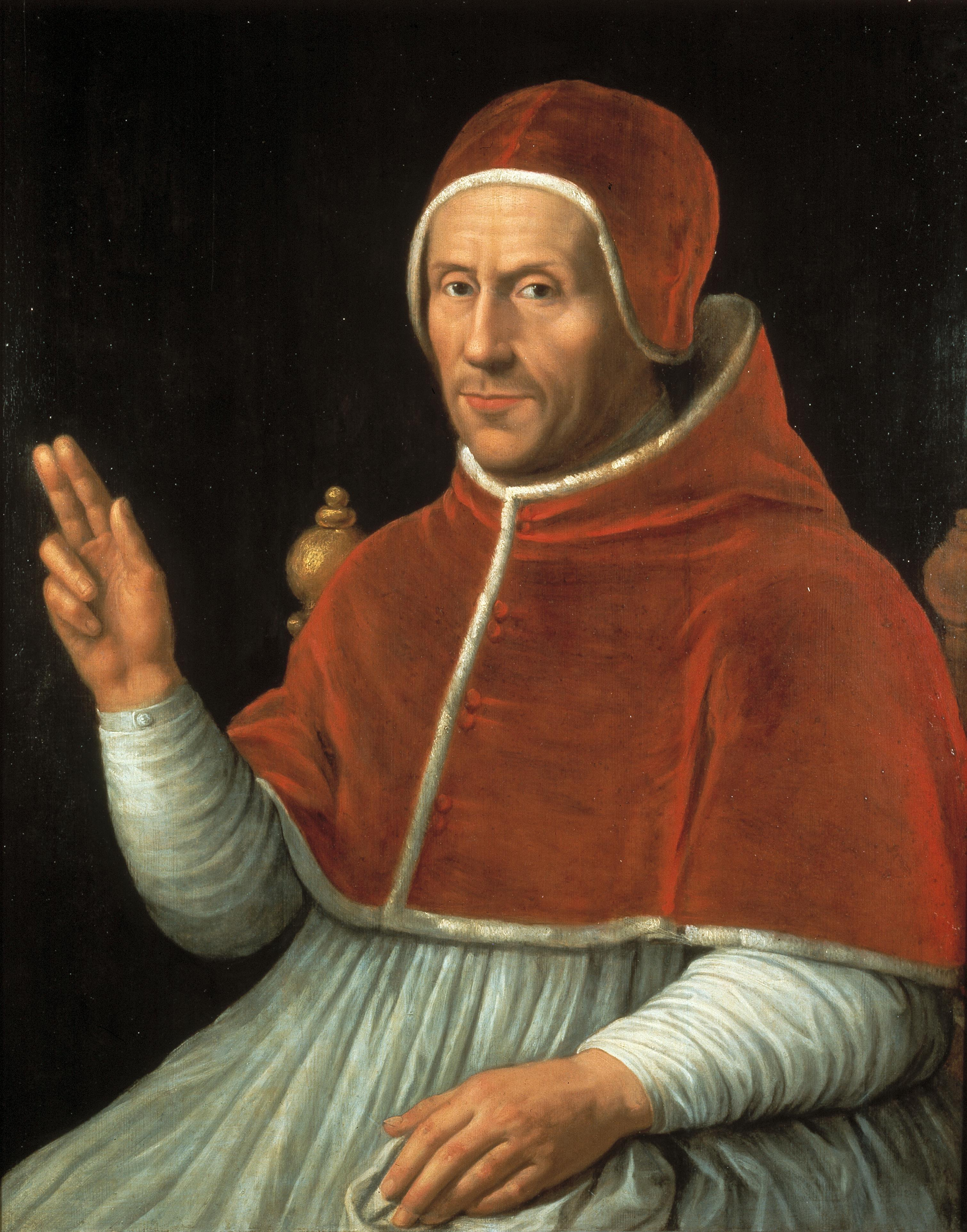
Pope Adrian VI (1522–1523)

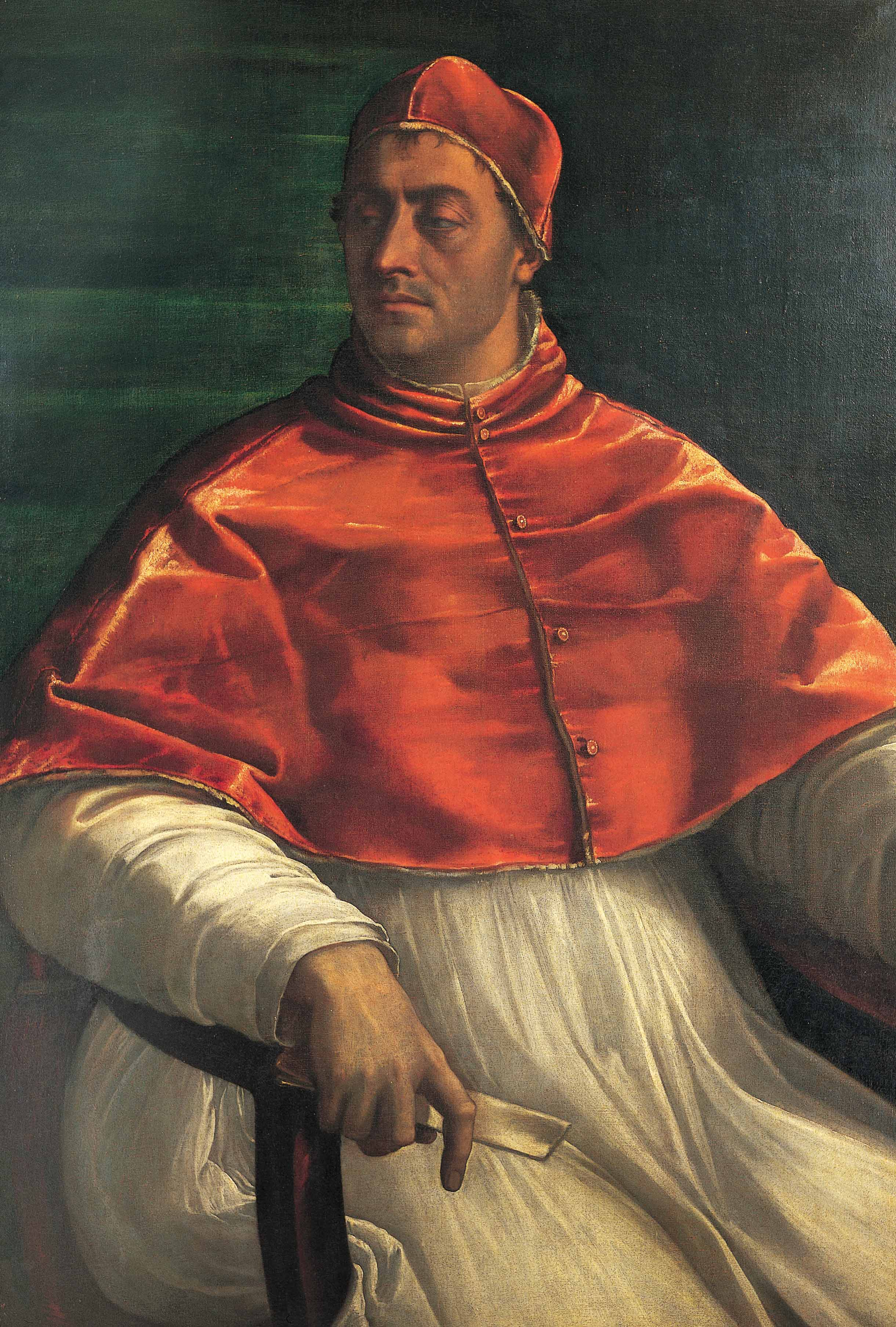
Pope Clement VII (1523–1534)

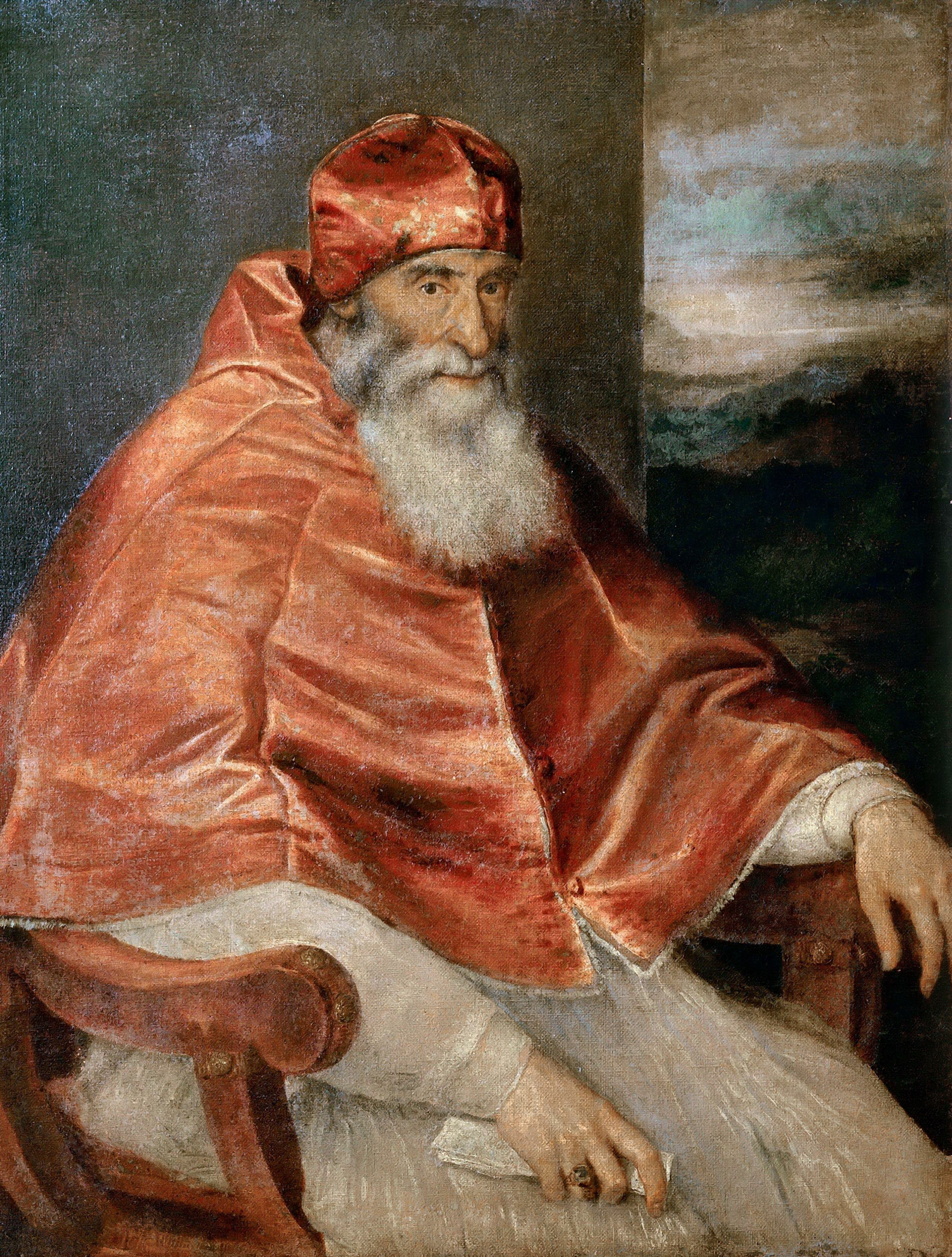
Pope Paul III (1534–1549)

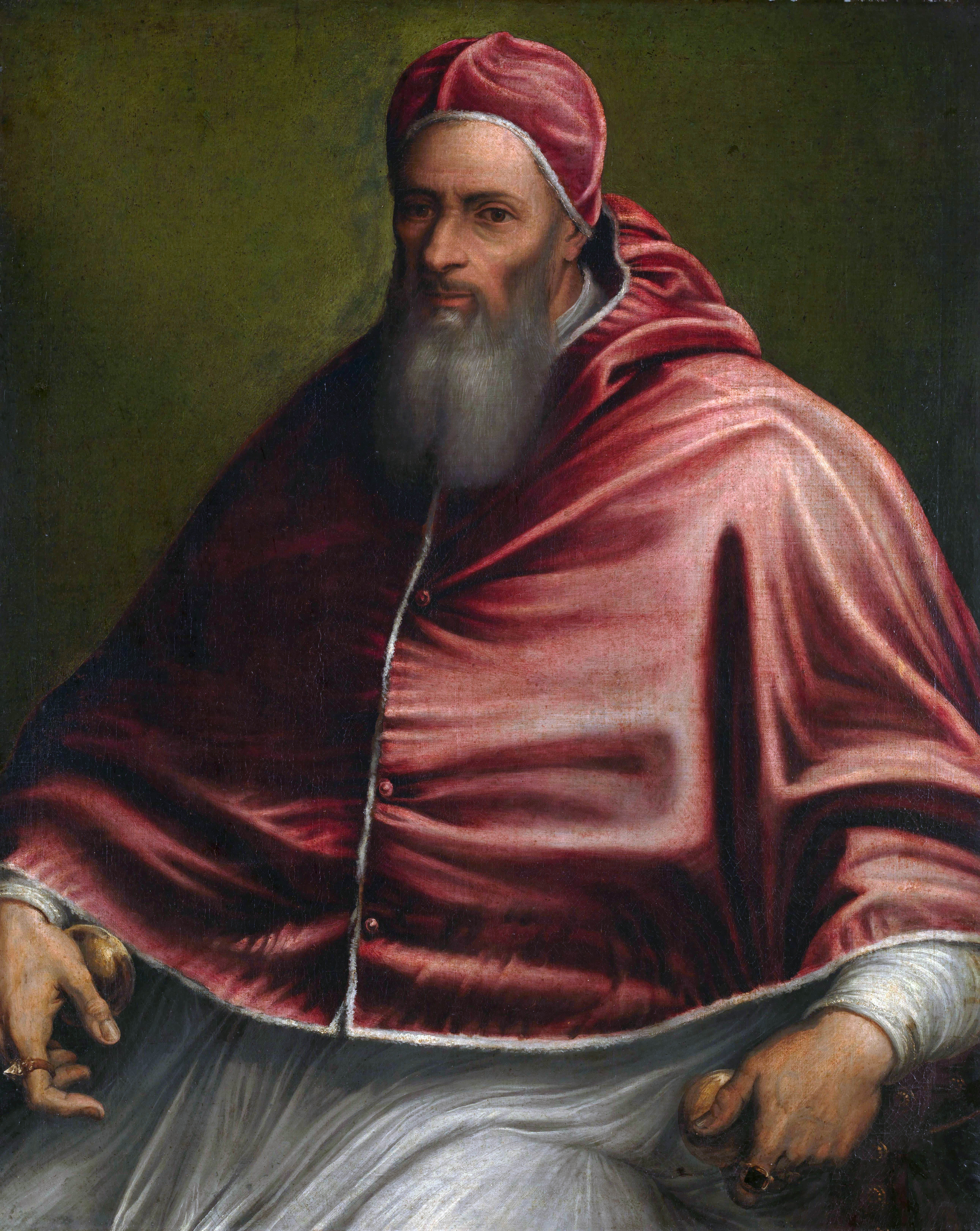
Pope Julius III (1550–1555)

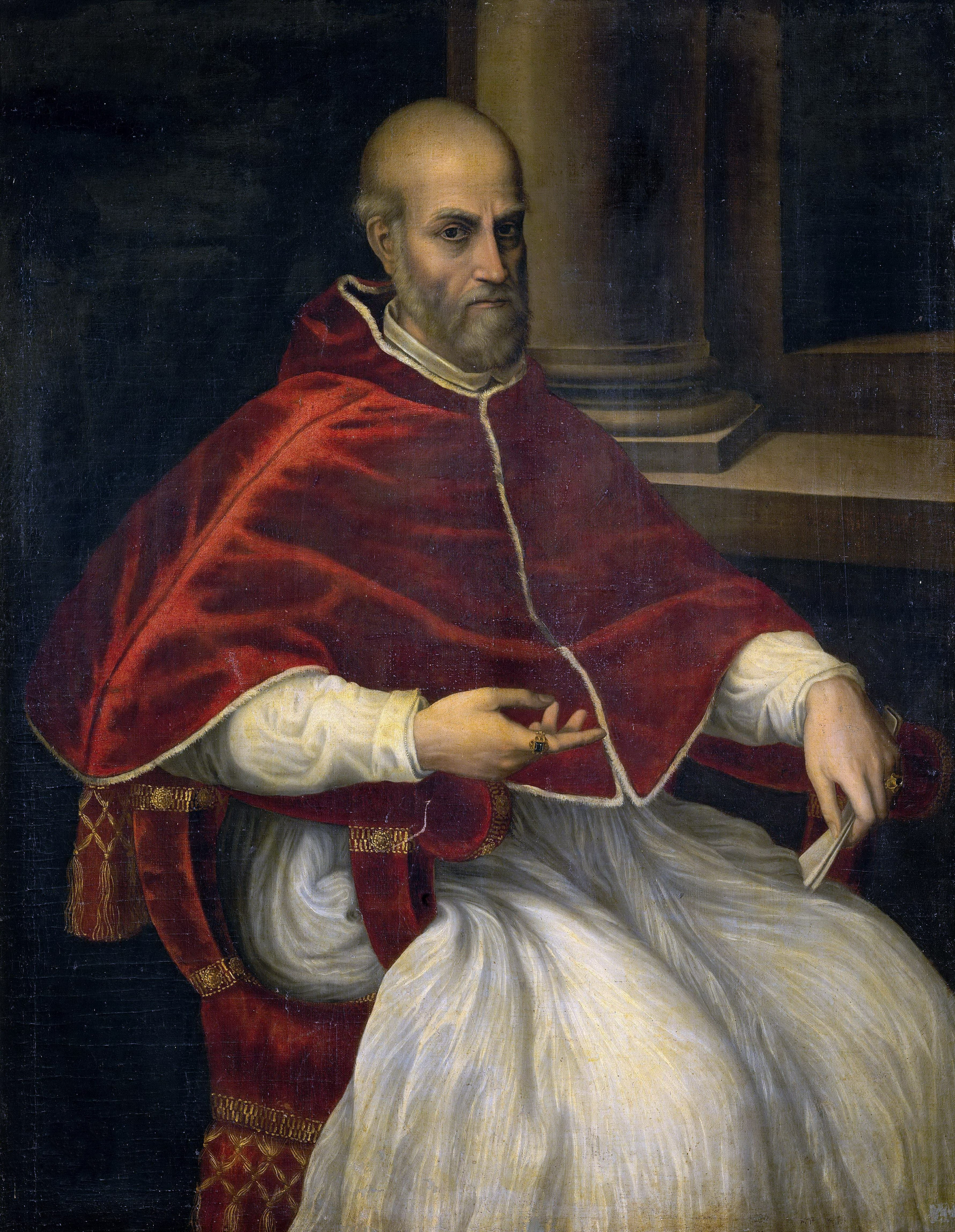
Pope Marcellus II (1555)

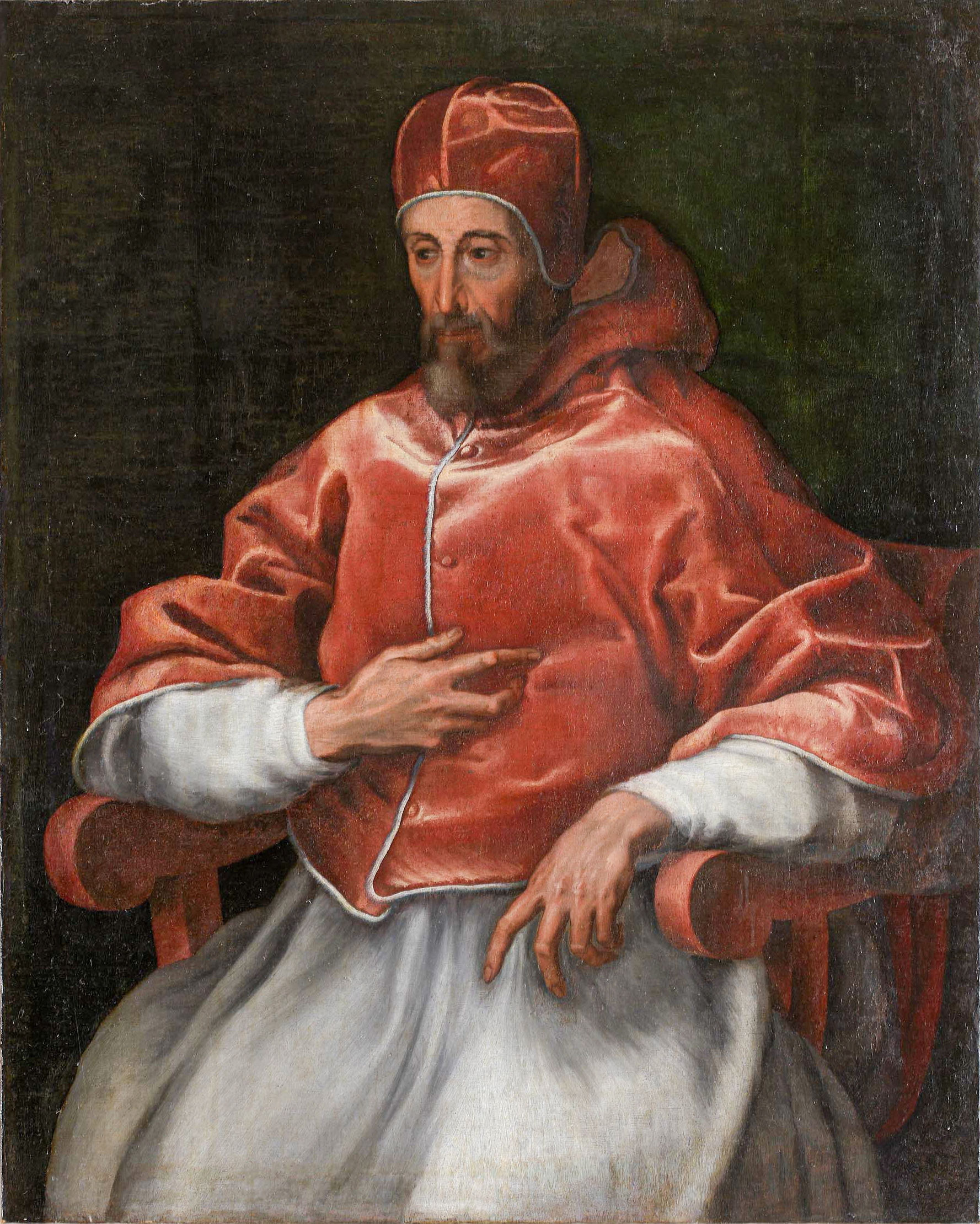
Pope Paul IV (1555–1559)

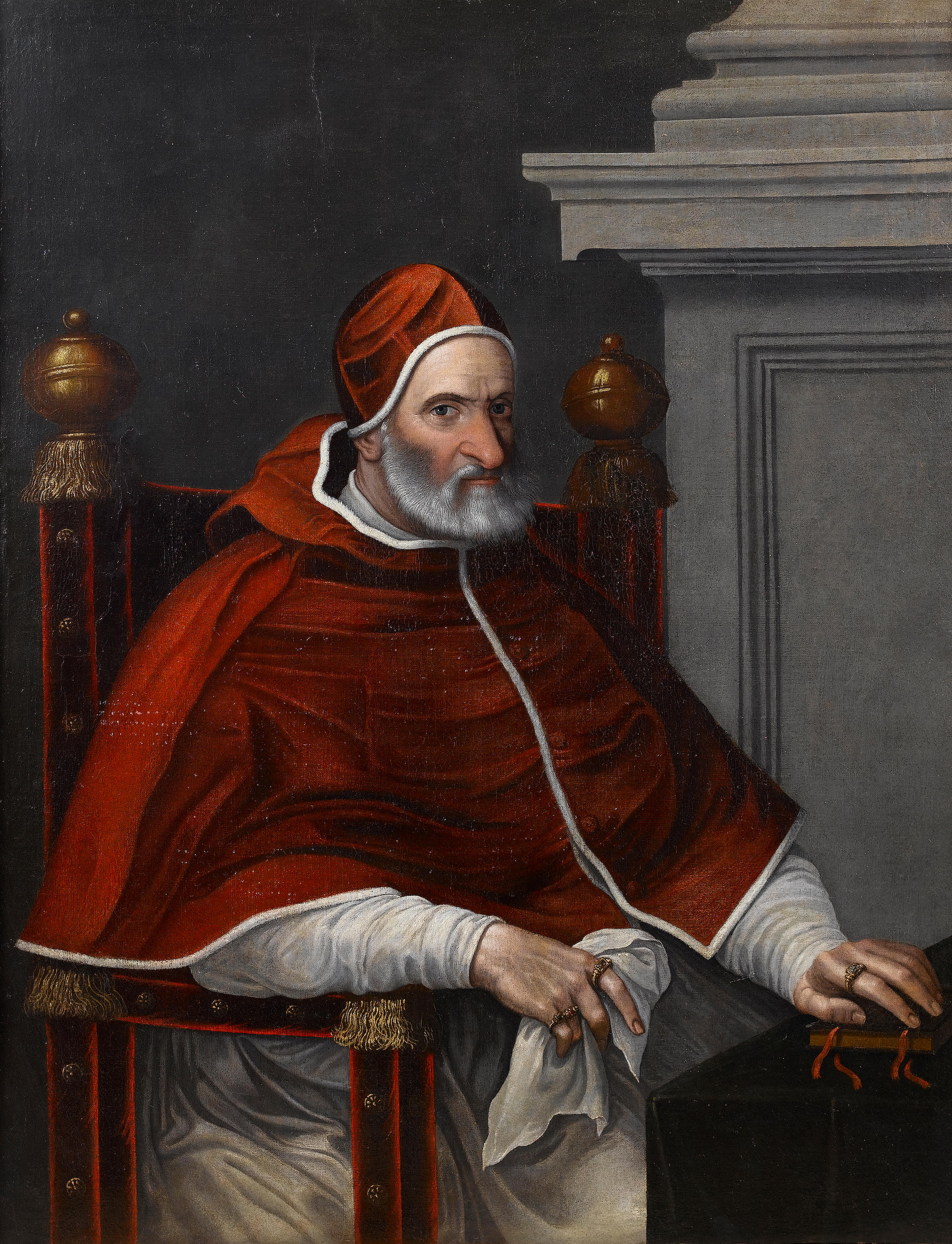
Pope Pius IV (1559–1565)
