= Execrabilis =

1460 papal bull condemning conciliarism

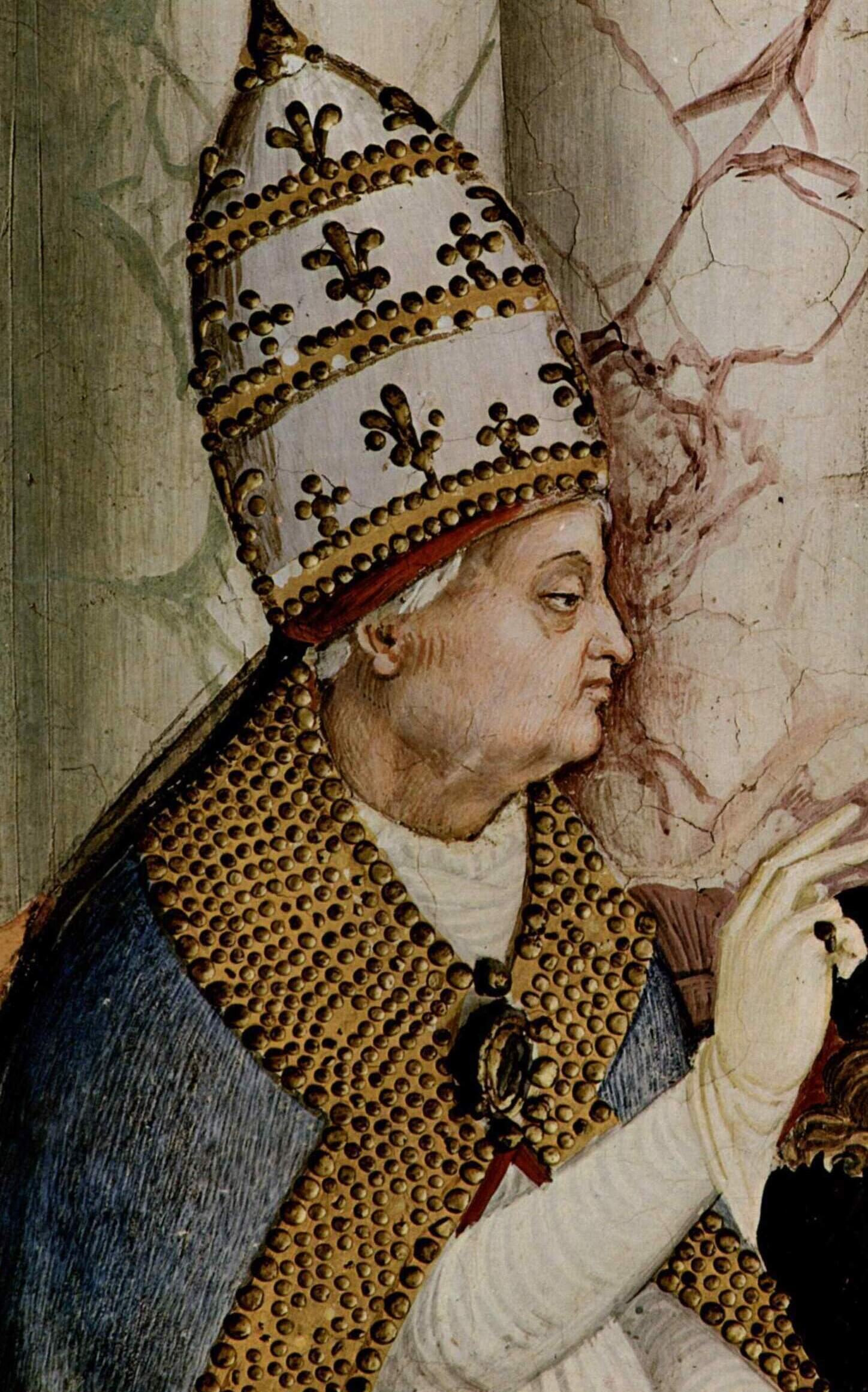
Fresco portrait of Pius II by Pinturicchio, c. 1502–7

Execrabilis is a papal bull issued by Pope Pius II on 18 January 1460 condemning conciliarism. The bull received its name from the opening word of its Latin text, which labelled as "execrable" all efforts to appeal an authoritative ruling of a Pope to a council.

Bulla of Pius II; a similar seal was affixed to Execrabilis

== Background ==
In 1415, the Council of Constance sought to put a definitive end to the Western Schism by asserting its authority over the rival papal claimants. It issued a document entitled Haec Sancta which

declares that if anyone, of whatever rank, condition, or dignity, including the pope, shall refuse to obey the commands, statutes, ordinances, or orders of this holy council, or of any other holy council properly assembled, in regard to the ending of the schism and to the reformation of the church, he shall be subject to the proper punishment, and unless he repents, he shall be duly punished.

This decree established a precedent whereby even the Pope is subject to the decrees of an ecumenical council. Encouraged by this decree, a rump of bishops defiantly continued to meet at Basel even after Pope Eugene IV had transferred the main body of the Council of Basel to Ferrara. Those remaining at Basel believed themselves to constitute the true council and even felt empowered to declare Eugene IV deposed and elect an anti-pope in response to their eventual excommunication. Although Basel had set out to reform the Catholic Church, the mixed and somewhat confused results it produced, coupled with Eugene IV's actions, convinced many to look somewhere other than the papacy for real reforms. At times these conciliarist attempts at reform became a political tool wielded by those who sought to undermine the Pope.

These developments posed a significant challenge to the authority of the papal office. In an effort to nullify the threat, Pius II issued Execrabilis to proclaim that the judgments of his office are final and cannot be appealed.

== Text ==
This bull denounces those who "presume to appeal from the pope to a future council, in spite of the fact that the pope is the vicar of Jesus Christ" and "condemn[s] all such appeals and prohibit[s] them as erroneous and detestable." Penalties for violators of any status or rank, including those having imperial, royal or even papal dignity, are grave. Anyone who contravened this papal decree would "ipso facto incur sentence of anathema, from which he cannot be absolved except by the Roman Pontiff and at the point of death." The bull concludes with a formula also used by Pope Pius XII at the conclusion of his Munificentissimus Deus that if anyone would seek to alter this decree, "let him know that he shall incur the indignation of Almighty God and of Saints Peter and Paul, His apostles."

== Reaction ==
Pius II had intended Execrabilis to put a definitive end to all future attempts to appeal papal decisions to a council. However, his intention was weakened by the fact that this injunction was not consistently invoked by subsequent Renaissance popes in response to the various manifestations of conciliarist tendencies. It was further weakened by the fact that it was "viewed less in its day as an authoritative pronouncement than a propagandistic proclamation of the view of one particular faction". Nonetheless, it was cited in 1483 by his successor Sixtus IV during the War of Ferrara as a pretext to excommunicate the Doge of Venice on account of a Venetian appeal to a council. In 1509, Pope Julius II again invoked Execrabilis when the Venetians appealed to a council during the War of the League of Cambrai.

When Execrabilis was issued, many prelates in France and Germany were opposed to this bull on account of their support for conciliarism. In the 16th century, these conciliarist tendencies helped to generate support for Martin Luther, who had in 1518 lodged with a notary his own appeal to a general council from the judgment of the Pope. In 1520, Pope Leo X alluded to Execrabilis when he brought up the name of his predecessor Pius II in his own bull, Exsurge Domine, which threatened Luther with excommunication for teachings the Catholic Church perceived to be problematic. Leo declared that "[Luther] broke forth in a rash appeal to a future council. This to be sure was contrary to the constitution of Pius II and Julius II our predecessors that all appealing in this way are to be punished with the penalties of heretics."

== See also ==
- Conciliarism
- Pope Pius II
