= Conrad of Gelnhausen =

German theologian and canon lawyer

Conrad of Gelnhausen (c. 1320 – 1390) was a German theologian and canon lawyer, and one of the founders of the conciliar movement of the late fourteenth century.

Details of his life are sketchy. He was baccalaureus at the University of Paris in 1344. For the two decades after then he can be tracked by prebends he is known to have had, in various places in Germany. He turned towards the law later in his career.

His influence was through writings from around 1380, after the Western Schism of 1378, the Epistola brevis and the Epistola concordiae. These appealed for the calling of an autonomous General Council to settle matters. This idea was taken up by others, such as Henry of Langenstein.
