= Conciliarism =

14th- to 16th-century Catholic movement

Conciliarism was a movement in the 14th-, 15th- and 16th-century Catholic Church which held that supreme authority in the Church resided with an ecumenical council, apart from, despite, or even if opposed by, the pope.

The movement emerged in response to the Western Schism between rival popes in Rome and Avignon. It was proposed that both popes abdicate in order to allow a new election that implemented a proposal where government supporters of the popes withdraw allegiance and thus prepare the way for a new election. The schism led to the summoning of the Council of Pisa (1409), which failed to end the schism, and the Council of Constance (1414–1418), which had more success, but which also proclaimed its own superiority over the Pope. Conciliarism reached its apex with the Council of Basel (1431–1449). The eventual victor in the warring movements was the pope and the institution of the papacy: the pope's power and teaching authority was confirmed by the condemnation of conciliarism at the Fifth Lateran Council (1512–1517). The apex of the theory of papal authority, on the other hand, was probably reached with the adoption of the doctrine of papal infallibility, promulgated by the First Vatican Council (1870).

== Background ==
Conciliar theory has its roots and foundations in both history and theology, arguing that many of the most important decisions of the Catholic Church have been made through conciliar means, beginning with the First Council of Nicaea (325). Conciliarism also drew on corporate theories of the church, which allowed the head to be restrained or judged by the members when his actions threatened the welfare of the whole ecclesial body.

In his Defensor Pacis (1324), Marsilius of Padua wrote that the universal Church is a church of the faithful, not the priests. Marsilius focused on the idea that the inequality of the priesthood has no divine basis and that Jesus, not the pope, is the only head of the Catholic Church.

William of Ockham (d. 1349) wrote some of the earliest documents outlining the basic understanding of conciliarism. His goal in these writings was removal of Pope John XXII, who had revoked a decree favoring ideas of the Spiritual Franciscans about Christ and the apostles owning nothing individually or in common. Some of William's arguments include that the election by the faithful, or their representatives, confers the position of pope and further limits the papal authority. The catholic (universal) church is the congregation of the faithful, not the institution, which was promised to the Apostles by Jesus.

== Conciliar theory ==
Conrad of Gelnhausen was one of the founders of the conciliar movement of the late fourteenth century. In response to the Western Schism of 1378, he advocated for the calling together of an autonomous General Council to settle the issue. This was echoed by scholastic philosopher, Henry of Langenstein.

The canonists and theologians who advocated conciliar superiority drew on the same sources used by Marsilius and William, but they used them in a more conservative way. They wanted to unify, defend and reform the institution under clerical control, not advance a Franciscan or a lay agenda. Among the theorists of this more clerical conciliarism were Jean Gerson, Pierre d'Ailly and Francesco Zabarella. Nicholas of Cusa synthesized this strain of conciliarism, balancing hierarchy with consent and representation of the faithful.

John Kilcullen wrote, in the Stanford Encyclopedia of Philosophy, that "in France conciliarism was one of the sources of Gallicanism."

== Opposition to conciliarism ==
Many members of the Church continued to believe that the pope, as the successor of Saint Peter, retained the supreme governing authority in the Church. Juan de Torquemada defended papal supremacy in his Summa de ecclesia, completed ca. 1453. A generation later, Thomas Cajetan vigorously defended papal authority in his On the comparison of the authority of pope and council. He wrote that "Peter alone had the vicariate of Jesus Christ and only he received the power of jurisdiction immediately from Christ in an ordinary way, so that the others (the Apostles) were to receive it from him in the ordinary course of the law and were subject to him," and that "Christ gave the plenitude of ecclesiastical power not to the community of the Church but to a single person in it."

Pope Pius II was a major opponent of conciliarism. According to Michael de la Bédoyère, "Pius II [...] [insisted] that the doctrine holding General Councils of the Church to be superior to the Pope was heretical." Pius II's bull Execrabilis condemned conciliarism.

Pope Pius VII condemned the conciliarist writings of Germanos Adam on June 3, 1816.

== Modern conciliarism ==
Although conciliarist strains of thought remain within the Church, the teaching of the Catholic Church maintains that the Pope is the Vicar of Christ, a title implying his supreme and universal primacy, both of honour and of jurisdiction, over the Church.

A new interest in conciliarism was awakened in Catholic Church circles with the convocation of the Second Vatican Council. Professor David D'Avray says that council documents emphasize episcopal authority, both individual and collegial, but presented as conjoined with papal authority rather than as over it.

== See also ==
- Conciliarity
- Haec sancta synodus
- Anticurialism
- Ultramontanism
- Medieval Restorationism
