= Henry of Langenstein =

German scholastic philosopher, theologian and mathematician (1325-1397)

- Born: Heinrich Heinbuche c. 1325; Landgraviate of Hesse
- Died: 11 February 1397; Vienna, Duchy of Austria, Holy Roman Empire
- Other name: Heinrich von Langenstein
- Education: University of Paris (M.A., 1363; M.Th., 1376)
- Known for: Reviving Eudoxus' cosmological model of homocentric spheres
- Scientific career
- Fields: Astronomy
- Workplaces: University of Paris; University of Vienna
- Academic advisors: Nicole Oresme
- Notable students: Johannes von Gmunden

Henry of Langenstein, also known as Henry of Hesse the Elder (German: Heinrich von Langenstein; born Heinrich Heinbuche; c. 1325 – 11 February 1397), was a German scholastic philosopher, theologian and mathematician.

== Biography ==
Henry was born at Hainbuch (Hembuche), near Langenstein, in the Landgraviate of Hesse. He studied at the University of Paris, where he finished his M.A. in 1363 and his M.Th. in 1376, and became professor of philosophy there this same year.

In 1368, on the occasion of the appearance of a comet, which the astrologers of his times claimed to be a sure foreboding of certain future events, he wrote a treatise entitled Quaestio de cometa, in which he refutes the then prevalent astrological beliefs. At the instance of the university he wrote three other treatises on the same subject, completed in 1373.

On his scientific work, A. C. Crombie writes

Oresme extended the impetus theory to psychology. One of his followers, Henry, while doubting whether the proportions and intentions of the elements of a given substance were knowable in detail, seriously considered the possibility of the generation of a plant or animal from the corpse of another species, for example of a fox from a dead dog. (Augustine to Galileo, Vol. 2, 1922, p. 114)

When the Western Schism broke out in 1378, Henry sided with Pope Urban VI against Antipope Clement VII, and wrote various treatises in defence of the former. In 1379 he composed "Epistola pacis" (see Helmstädter Program, 1779 and 1780) in which, under the form of a disputation between an Urbanist and a Clementine, he advocates the suppression of the schism by way of a general council or a compromise. In his Epistola concilii pacis, composed in 1381, and based on a similar work, the Epistola Concordiae of Conrad of Gelnhausen, he urges still more strongly the necessity of a general council and severely criticises the many abuses that were permitted to go on within the Church.

These two treatises of Henry, and the Epistola Concordiae of Conrad, formed the basis of a discourse delivered by Cardinal Pietro Philargi, the future Alexander V, at the first session of the Council of Pisa (26 March 1409; see Bliemetzrieder in Historisches Jahrbuch (Munich, 1904), XXV, 536-541). Henry's Epistola concilii pacis is printed in von der Hardt's Concilium Constantiense, II, 1, 3-60, with the exception of the first and the second chapter, which were afterwards published by the same author in Discrepantia mss. et editionum (Helmstadt, 1715), 9-11.

When in 1382 the French court compelled the professors of the College of Sorbonne (University of Paris) to acknowledge the antipope Clement VII, Henry left the university and spent some time at Eberbach Abbey, a Cistercian monastery near Wiesbaden. A letter which he wrote here to Bishop Eckard of Worms, and which bears the title De scismate was edited by Sommerfeldt in Historisches Jahrbuch (Munich, 1909), XXX, 46–61. Another letter which he wrote here to the same bishop, on the occasion of the death of the bishop's brother, is entitled De contemptu mundi (edited by Sommerfeldt in Zeitschrift für katholische Theologie (Innsbruck, 1905), XXIX, 406-412). A second letter of condolence, written about 1384, was edited by Sommerfeldt in "Hist. Jahrbuch" (Munich, 1909), XXX, 298–307.

Following the invitation of Albert III, Duke of Austria, he went to the University of Vienna in 1384, and assisted in the foundation of a theological faculty. Here he spent the remainder of his life, teaching dogmatic theology, exegesis, and Canon law, and writing numerous treatises.

In 1384 Heinrich von Langenstein, together with his colleague and friend Heinrich Totting von Oytha (who descended from the Northern German town now known as Friesoythe), took up teaching and administrative duties at the newly established University of Vienna (founded 1365, first students subscribed 1385).

He died at Vienna, having refused an episcopal see which was offered him by Urban VI.

== Legacy ==
In 2008 the University of Vienna attached a third memorial plaque to Heinrich von Langenstein and Heinrich Totting in the University Church, St. Stephen's Cathedral, Vienna (first: 1397 upon their burial in the Apostelchoir, second: upon re-burial of the two friends in the Katharinenkapelle 1510) near the Apostelchoir, acknowledging the two teachers the "founding professors" of the University of Vienna.

== Works ==
Roth (see below) ascribes to him seven works on astronomy, eighteen historico-political treatises on the schism, seventeen polemics, fifty ascetical treatises, and twelve epistles, sermons and pamphlets. Among his printed works are:

- Tractatulus de arte praedicandi valde utilis, 1494
- De conceptione, a defence of the Immaculate Conception (Strasburg, 1500)
- Contra disceptationes et praedicationes contrarias fratrum Mendicantium, another defence of the Immaculate Conception against some of the Mendicants (Milan, 1480; Basle, 1500; Strasburg, 1516)
- Speculum animae or mirror of the soul, an ascetic treatise edited by Wimpfeling (Strasburg, 1507)
- Secreta sacerdotum que in missa teneri debent multum utilia, treating of certain abuses in the celebration of Mass, edited by Michael Lochmayer (Heidelberg, 1489), and often thereafter
- Tractatus bipartitus de contractibus, (c. 1392) also known as the Tractatus de contractibus et de origine censuum. A treatise on money, prices, and contracts. It is published in manuscript from among the works of Jean Gerson (Cologne, 1483), IV, 185–224. A transcribed edition of this text can be found here, and extensive bibliographic information here. A complete (albeit AI-assisted) English translation can be found here.
- Summa de republica, a work on public law
- Cathedra Petri, a work on ecclesiastical policy.
