= Western Schism =

Split within the Catholic Church from 1378 to 1417

- Part of the crisis of the late Middle Ages
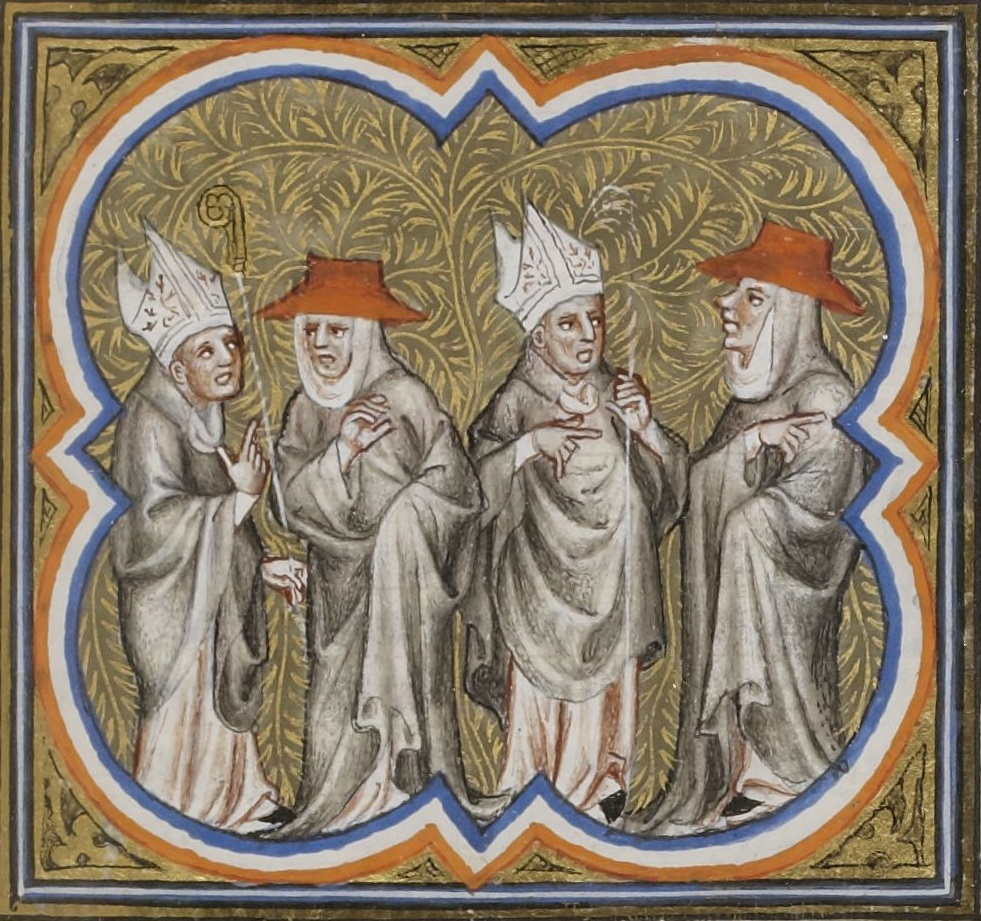
- A 14th-century miniature symbolizing the schism
- Date: 20 September 1378 – 11 November 1417 (39 years, 1 month, 3 weeks and 1 day)
- Location: Europe
- Type: Christian schism
- Cause: Election of two popes by the College of Cardinals in 1378; Election of a third pope by the Council of Pisa in 1409
- Motive: International rivalries in Catholic Europe
- Outcome: Reunification of the Catholic Church after the Council of Constance

The Western Schism, also known as the Great Divide, the Great Occidental Schism, the Schism of 1378, or the Great Western Schism (Latin: Magnum schisma occidentale, Ecclesiae occidentalis schisma), was a split within the Catholic Church lasting from 20 September 1378 to 11 November 1417, in which bishops residing in Rome and Avignon simultaneously claimed to be the true pope, and were eventually joined by a line of Pisan claimants in 1409. The event was driven by international rivalries, personalities and political allegiances, with the Avignon Papacy in particular being closely tied to the French monarchy.

The papacy had resided in Avignon since 1309, but Gregory XI returned to Rome in 1377. The Catholic Church split in September 1378, when, following Gregory XI's death and Urban VI's subsequent election, a group of French cardinals declared his election invalid due to intimidation and violence and, in the presence of three Italian cardinals, elected Clement VII, who claimed to be the true pope. As Roman claimant, Urban VI was succeeded by Boniface IX, Innocent VII and Gregory XII. Clement VII was succeeded as Avignon claimant by Benedict XIII.

Following several attempts at reconciliation, the Council of Pisa (1409) declared that both Gregory XII and Benedict XIII were heretical and schismatic, and elected another pope, Alexander V.

The schism was finally resolved when Alexander V's successor as Pisan claimant, John XXIII, called the Council of Constance (1414–1418). The Council arranged for the renunciation of both the Roman Gregory XII and the Pisan John XXIII. The Avignonian Benedict XIII was excommunicated, while Martin V was elected and reigned from Rome.

The split is sometimes referred to as the 'Great Schism', although this term is usually reserved for the East–West Schism of 1054 between the churches remaining in communion with the See of Rome and those remaining with the See of Constantinople.

== History ==
Under pressure from King Philip IV of France, the popes had, since 1309, resided in Avignon, a papal enclave surrounded by France. Initiated by Clement V, the Avignon Papacy had developed a reputation for corruption that estranged much of Western Christendom. This reputation was attributed to perceptions of strong French influence, the papal curia's efforts to extend its powers of patronage, and attempts to increase its revenues. The last Avignon pope, Gregory XI, at the entreaty of relatives, friends, and his retinue, decided to return to Rome on 17 January 1377. Gregory, however, announced his intention to reverse his decision and return to Avignon just after the Easter celebrations of 1378.

Before he could return to Avignon, Gregory XI died in the Apostolic Palace on 27 March 1378. The Romans put into operation a plan to use intimidation and violence (impressio et metus) to ensure the election of a Roman pope. The pope and his curia had returned to Rome after seventy years in Avignon, and the Romans were prepared to do everything in their power to keep them there. On 8 April 1378, the cardinals elected Bartolomeo Prignano, the archbishop of Bari, to succeed Gregory as Urban VI.

== Two popes ==
Map showing allegiance to Rome (blue), to Avignon (red), and variable allegiance (orange) during the Western Schism; this breakdown is valid until the Council of Pisa (1409), which created a third line of claimants.

The majority of the cardinals who had elected Urban VI quickly regretted their decision and removed themselves to Anagni. Meeting at Fondi, thirteen cardinals elected Clement VII on 20 September 1378. The dissident cardinals argued that the election of Urban VI was invalid because it had been out of fear of the rioting Roman crowds. Unable to maintain himself in Anagni, and following the defeat of his forces at the Battle of Marino, Clement VII fled to Naples, which was ruled by one of his supporters, Queen Joanna I of Naples. Despite being met regally by Joanna, Clement was met with the populace chanting Viva Papa Urbano (Long Live Pope Urban) and Muoia l'Anticristo (Death to the Antichrist), which convinced him to leave. He took a ship to Avignon and reestablished the papal court there. King Charles V of France, who seems to have been irked beforehand by the choice of the Roman pontiff, soon became his greatest protector. Besides France, Clement eventually succeeded in winning to his cause Castile, Aragon, Navarre, Poland, Lithuania, Hungary, Scotland, and most of Italy besides Naples and Savoy. Years later, Owain Glyndŵr's rebellion in Wales also recognized the Avignonian Benedict XIII. King John I of Portugal, the founder of the House of Aviz, who took the throne with English support signed the Treaty of Windsor in 1386 and firmly sided with Urban VI. Unlike their relatives, the Angevin rulers of Hungary (Louis I and Mary) supported Rome. Joanna I of Naples, who sided with Clement VII was deposed and replaced by Charles III in 1381. Charles III later took the throne of Hungary from Mary; for this she was excommunicated by Urban VI.

=== Consequences ===
In the intense partisanship that was characteristic of the Middle Ages, the schism engendered a fanatical hatred noted by Johan Huizinga:

when the town of Bruges went over to the "obedience" of Avignon, a great number of people left to follow their trade in a city of Urbanist allegiance. ... In the 1382, the oriflamme, which might only be unfurled in a holy cause, was taken up against the Flemings, because they were Urbanists, that is, infidels.

Sustained by such national and factional rivalries, the schism continued after the deaths of both Urban VI in 1389 and Clement VII in 1394. Boniface IX was crowned in Rome in 1389, and Benedict XIII, who was elected against the wishes of King Charles VI of France, reigned in Avignon from 1394. When Pope Boniface died in 1404, the eight cardinals of the Roman conclave offered to refrain from electing a new pope if Benedict would resign; but when Benedict's legates refused on his behalf, (Note: According to Joëlle Rollo-Koster, Benedict's legates were imprisoned until after the conclave ended.) the Roman party then proceeded to elect Innocent VII. Discussions continued instead with Innocent, but quickly stalled and by February 1405, Benedict's envoys had returned to Avignon. Benedict quickly excommunicated Innocent and with an army started marching towards Rome, in May 1405. He occupied Genoa for a year and awaited French military support, which never came. Innocent died 6 November 1406, and the Roman cardinals elected Angelo Correr as Gregory XII.

The suggestion for a church council to resolve the Schism, first made in 1378, was not adopted initially, because canon law required that a pope call a council. Eventually theologians like Pierre d'Ailly and Jean Gerson adopted arguments that permitted the Church to call a council to resolve this issue, while Francesco Zabarella argued that a council could only be convoked by an emperor.

== Three popes ==
Benedict and Gregory agreed to abdicate their respective papacies in December 1406. However, Benedict stated that he wanted to negotiate a solution first. Gregory sent an ambassador to the St. Victor abbey in Marseille, where Benedict was staying. On the other hand, Gregory preferred Savona, and Benedict concurred. They balked at the last moment, and both groups of cardinals abandoned their preferred leaders. The Council of Pisa met in 1409 under the auspices of the cardinals to try solving the dispute. At the fifteenth session, on 5 June 1409, the Council of Pisa attempted to depose both the Roman pope and Avignon antipope as schismatical, heretical, perjured and scandalous, but proceeded to inflame the problem even further by electing Peter Philargi, the cardinal Archbishop of Milan, as Alexander V. He reigned briefly in Pisa from June 26, 1409, to his death in 1410, when he was succeeded by Baldassare Cossa as John XXIII, who achieved limited support.

=== Council of Constance ===
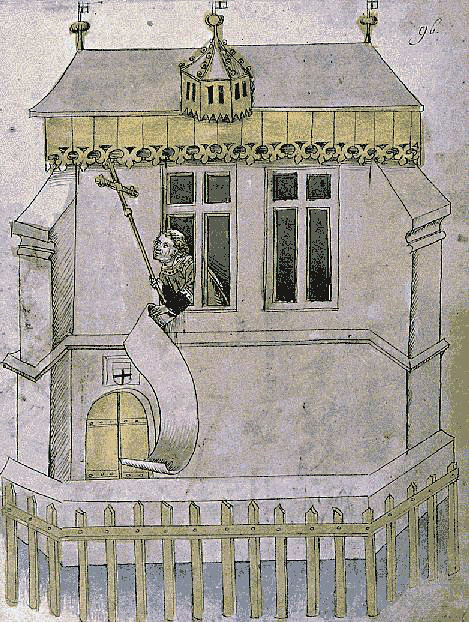
Habemus Papam at the Council of Constance

In 1414, the Council of Constance was convened by the Pisan pope John XXIII to resolve the schism once and for all. The council was also endorsed by the Roman pope Gregory XII, giving it greater legitimacy. On 6 April 1415, the council issued Haec sancta, stating that the council is the Church's highest governing body and has the authority to remove popes. Haec sancta is today considered invalid by the Catholic Church, on the basis that Gregory XII was the legitimate pope at the time and the decree was passed by the council in a session before his confirmation; further, since it was not used to remove him, it was not actually used to remove the pope.

The council, advised by the theologian Jean Gerson, secured the resignation of Gregory XII and the detention and removal of John XXIII. The Avignon Benedict XIII, who refused to step down, was excommunicated on 27 July 1417, having lost all his supporters in the process. The Council elected Martin V in 1417, essentially ending the schism.

The Avignonian Benedict XIII, recognized by King Martin of Aragon in 1397, chose to ignore pleas for his resignation. Benedict died 23 May 1423: to succeed him three cardinals elected Gil Sanchez Munoz y Carbon as Clement VIII. Clement VIII resigned in 1429 and recognized Martin V.

== Aftermath ==
Conciliarism gained impetus due to the Schism. This new reformist movement held that a general council is superior to the pope on the strength of its capability to resolve ecclesiastical issues. Theorists such as Jean Gerson explained that the priests and the church itself are the sources of the papal power and, thus, the church should be able to correct, punish, and, if necessary, depose a pope.

On 18 January 1460, Pope Pius II issued the bull Execrabilis which forbade any attempt to appeal papal judgements by general councils.

There was also a marked decline in discipline within the church. Scholars note that the Western Schism effectively eroded the church's authority and its capacity to proclaim the gospel. This dissension and loss of unity ultimately culminated in the Protestant Reformation of the 16th century.

== Official list of popes ==
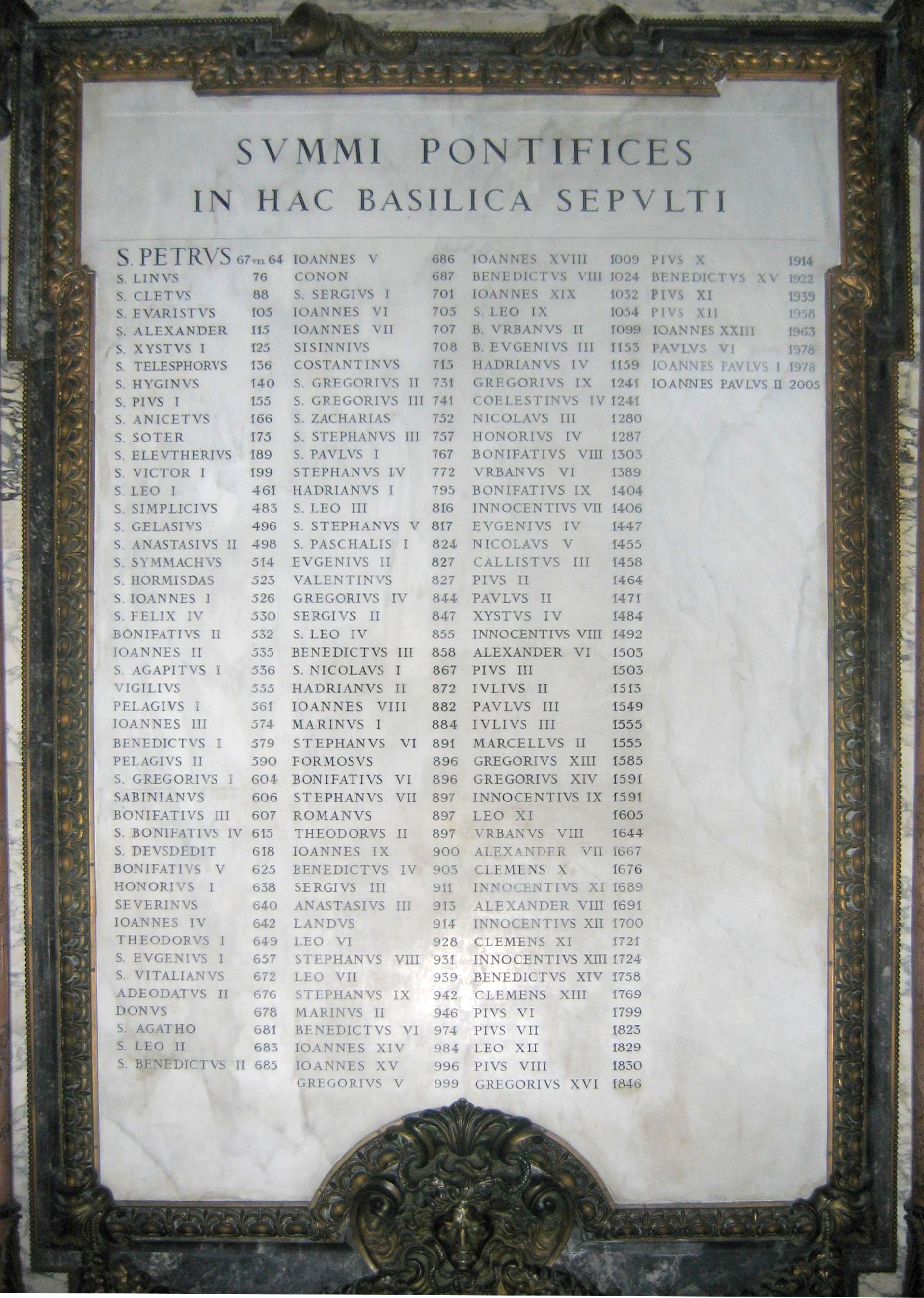
Plaque commemorating the popes buried in St. Peter's Basilica. Alexanders VI, VII, and VIII are numbered as though the Pisan pope Alexander V were legitimate, but John XXIII (d. 1963) reused the ordinal of the Pisan pope John XXIII.

For the next five centuries, the Catholic Church recognized the Roman popes as the legitimate line from 1378 to 1409, followed by the Pisan popes from 1409 to 1415. All Avignon popes after 1378 are considered to be antipopes. This recognition is reflected in the numbering of popes Alexander VI, VII, and VIII, who numbered themselves consecutively after their Pisan namesake Alexander V.

The recognition of the Pisan popes made the continued legitimacy of the Roman pope Gregory XII doubtful for 1409–1415. The editions of the Annuario Pontificio through 1946 list the Pisan popes as true popes from 1409 to 1415, and acknowledged that Gregory XII's reign ended in either 1409 or 1415, but editions from the year 1947 began to list the Roman claimants as valid and to describe the Avignonese and Pisan claimants as antipopes.

The Western Schism was, in practice, reinterpreted in 1958 when Angelo Giuseppe Roncalli chose to reuse the ordinal XXIII upon his election as Pope John XXIII, citing "twenty-two [sic] Johns of indisputable legitimacy". (There had actually been twenty undisputed Johns due to antipopes and numbering errors.) Although Roncalli's declaration of assuming the name specified that his decision was made "apart from disputes about legitimacy", this passage was subsequently excised from the version appearing in the Acta Apostolicae Sedis, and the Pisan popes Alexander V and John XXIII have since been classified as antipopes by the Roman Curia. The reinterpretation is reflected in modern editions of the Annuario Pontificio, which extend Gregory XII's reign to 1415. The line of Roman popes is now retroactively recognized by the Catholic Church as the sole legitimate line during the Western Schism. However, Popes Alexander VI through VIII have not been renumbered, leaving a gap in the numbering sequence.

According to John F. Broderick (1987):

Doubt still shrouds the validity of the three rival lines of pontiffs during the four decades subsequent to the still disputed papal election of 1378. This makes suspect the credentials of the cardinals created by the Roman, Avignon, and Pisan claimants to the Apostolic See. Unity was finally restored without a definitive solution to the question; for the Council of Constance succeeded in terminating the Western Schism, not by declaring which of the three claimants was the rightful one, but by eliminating all of them by forcing their abdication or deposition, and then setting up a novel arrangement for choosing a new pope acceptable to all sides. To this day the Church has never made any official, authoritative pronouncement about the papal lines of succession for this confusing period; nor has Martin V or any of his successors. Modern scholars are not agreed in their solutions, although they tend to favor the Roman line.

=== Papal recognition ===
Papacy	Avignon popes	Roman popes	Pisan popes (from 1409)
Supporters:	House of Valois; Kingdom of France (until 1409); Kingdom of Navarre; Kingdom of Naples (until 1382, continued to fight Hungary); Kingdom of Portugal (until 1385); Burgundian State; Crown of Aragon; Crown of Castile; Kingdom of Scotland; Kingdom of Sicily; County of Savoy; Duchy of Brittany; Kingdom of Cyprus; Crown of Bohemia; Knights of Rhodes; Welsh rebels (fought against England); County of Foix; County of Armagnac; Kingdom of Tyrconnell; Mayo Burkes; small number of estates of the Holy Roman Empire	Italian city-states (Central-Northern Italy); Papal States; Republic of Venice; Republic of Genoa; Republic of Florence; Holy Roman Empire (majority and the Emperor, only a small number of estates aligned with Avignon); Kingdom of England; Ireland under English rule; Gaelic kingdoms of Ireland; Kingdom of Naples (since 1382); Kingdom of Portugal (aligned with Rome in 1385); Kingdom of Hungary (until 1385); Kingdom of Hungary (since 1385); Crown of Poland; Grand Duchy of Lithuania; County of Flanders; Kingdom of Denmark; Kingdom of Norway; Kingdom of Sweden; Teutonic Order; Duchy of Aquitaine; Ghent rebels (fought against France)	Kingdom of France (from 1409); Kingdom of England; Ireland under English rule; Crown of Poland (changed two times to Roman pope Gregory XII in 1410 and 1414); Grand Duchy of Lithuania; Kingdom of Hungary (changed to Roman pope Gregory XII in 1414); Kingdom of Portugal (began supporting Pisa in 1409); Kingdom of Denmark; Kingdom of Norway; Kingdom of Sweden; some imperial states of Holy Roman Empire; Teutonic Order (from 1409–1415 was in alliance with Pisa)

== Sources ==
- Atwood, Craig D. (2001). Always Reforming: A History of Christianity Since 1300. Mercer University Press.
- Bellitto, Christopher M. (2002). The General Councils. Paulist Press.
- Blumenfeld-Kosinski, Renate (2009). "The Conceptualization and Imagery of the Great Schism". In Rollo-Koster, Joëlle; Izbicki, Thomas M. (eds.). A Companion to the Great Western Schism (1378–1417). Brill. pp. 123–158.
- Broderick, John F. (1987). "The Sacred College of Cardinals: Size and Geographical Composition (1099–1986)". Archivum Historiae Pontificiae. 25. Gregorian Biblical Press: 7–71.
- Cable, Martin J. (2015). "Cum essem in Constantie...": Raffaele Fulgosio and the Council of Constance, 1414-1415. Brill.
- Coriden, James (2004). An Introduction to Canon Law. Paulist Press. ISBN 0809142562.
- Creighton, Mandell (2012). The Great Schism. The Council of Constance, 1378–1418. Houghton, Mifflin & Company.
- Fleck, Cathleen A. (2009). "Seeking Legitimacy:Art and Manuscripts for the Popes in Avignon from 1378 to 1417". In Rollo-Koster, Joëlle; Izbicki, Thomas M. (eds.). A Companion to the Great Western Schism (1378–1417). Brill. pp. 239–302.
- Fleck, Cathleen A. (2016). The Clement Bible at the Medieval Courts of Naples and Avignon: "A Story of Papal Power, Royal Prestige, and Patronage. Routledge.266
- Gregorovius, Ferdinand (1906). Hamilton, Annie (ed.). History of the City of Rome in the Middle Ages. Vol. VI, Part II. George Bell.
- González, Justo (2010). The Story of Christianity. Vol. 1: The Early Church to the Dawn of the Reformation. New York: HarperCollins. pp. 408–409. ISBN 9780061855887.
- Huizinga, Johan (1924). The Waning of the Middle Ages: A Study of the Forms of Life, Thought and Art in France and the Netherlands in the XIVth and XVth Centuries. Edward Arnold & Co.
- Hunyadi, Zsolt (2017). "The Western Schism and Hungary: from Louis I to Sigismund of Luxembourg". Chronica: Annual of the Institute of History, University of Szeged Hungary. 13: 44–53. ISSN 1588-2039.
- "I Choose John ..." Time. Vol. LXXII No.19. 1958. p. 91.
- Keen, Maurice, ed. (2010). Medieval Warfare: A History. Oxford University Press.
- Kelly, J.N.D. (1986). Oxford Dictionary of the Popes. Oxford University Press.
- Kneupper, Frances Courtney (2016). The Empire At The End Of Time. Oxford University Press.
- Linder, Robert D. (2008). The Reformation Era. Greenwood Press.
- Logan, F. Donald (2002). A History of the Church in the Middle Ages. Routledge.
- McGuire, Brian Patrick (2006). A Companion to Jean Gerson. Brill.
- Oakley, Francis (2003). The Conciliarist Tradition: Constitutionalism in the Catholic Church 1300-1870. Oxford University Press.
- Oakley, Francis (2008). "The Conciliar Heritage and the Politics of Oblivion". In Christianson, Gerald; Izbicki, Thomas M.; Bellitto, Christopher M. (eds.). The Church, the Councils, and Reform: The Legacy of the Fifteenth Century. Washington, D.C.: The Catholic University of America Press. p. 89. ISBN 978-0813215273.
- O'Brien, Emily (2015). The 'Commentaries' of Pope Pius II (1458-1464) and the Crisis of the Fifteenth-Century Papacy. University of Toronto Press.
- O'Callaghan, Joseph F. (1975). A History of Medieval Spain. Cornell University Press.
- Orji, Cyril (2021). An Introduction to Religious and Theological Studies (2nd ed.). Cascade Books.
- Riccoboni, Sister Bartolomea (2000). Bornstein, Daniel (ed.). Life and Death in a Venetian Convent: The Chronicle and Necrology of Corpus. The University of Chicago Press.
- Richardson, Carol M. (2009). Reclaiming Rome: Cardinals in the Fifteenth Century. Brill.
- Rollo-Koster, Joëlle (2009). "Civil Violence and the Initiation of the Schism". In Rollo-Koster, Joëlle; Izbicki, Thomas M. (eds.). A Companion to the Great Western Schism (1378–1417). Brill. pp. 9–66.
- Rollo-Koster, Joëlle (2022). The Great Western Schism, 1378–1417: Performing Legitimacy, Performing Unity. Cambridge University Press.
- Rosenwein, Barbara H. (2018). A Short History of the Middle Ages. Vol. II: From c.900 to c.1500. University of Toronto Press.
- Scott, Karen (1993). "Io Catarina: Ecclesiastical Politics and Oral Culture in the Letters of Catherine of Siena". In Cherewatuk, Karen; Wiethaus, Ulrike (eds.). Dear Sister: Medieval Women and the Epistolary Genre. University of Pennsylvania Press.
- Stump, Philip H. (2009). "The Council of Constance (1414-1418) and the End of the Schism". In Rollo-Koster, Joëlle; Izbicki, Thomas M. (eds.). A Companion to the Great Western Schism (1378–1417). Brill. pp. 395–442.
- Swanson, Robert (2021). "The church and religious life: The papacy". In Lazzarini, Isabella (ed.). The Later Middle Ages. Oxford University Press. pp. 79–108.
- Trexler, R.C. (1974). The Spiritual Power: Republican Florence under Interdict. Brill.
- Villalon, L. J. Andrew (2014). "10. War and the Great Schism: Military Factors Determining Allegiances in Iberia". Journal of Medieval Military History. XII: 217–239. ISBN 9781843839361. ISSN 1477-545X.
- Walsh, Michael J. (2011). The Cardinals: Thirteen Centuries of the Men Behind the Papal Throne. Wm. B. Eerdmans Publishing. ISBN 9780802829412.
- Lindberg, Carter. The European Reformations. Available from: Yuzu, (3rd Edition). Wiley Global Research (STMS), 2020.
