= Absurdity =

Extremely unreasonable, foolish

Absurdity is the state or condition of being unreasonable, meaningless, or so unsound as to be irrational. "Absurd" is the adjective used to describe absurdity, e.g., "David and the boys laughed at the absurd situation." It derives from the Latin absurdum meaning "out of tune". Outside of music or acoustics, the term came to mean "out of harmony with reason". The Latin surdus means "deaf", implying stupidity. Absurdity is contrasted with being realistic or reasonable. In general usage, absurdity may be synonymous with nonsense, meaninglessness, fancifulness, foolishness, bizarreness, wildness. In specialized usage, absurdity is related to extremes in bad reasoning or pointlessness in reasoning; ridiculousness is related to extremes of incongruous juxtaposition, laughter, and ridicule; and nonsense is related to a lack of meaningfulness. Absurdism is a concept in philosophy related to the notion of absurdity.

== Philosophy ==
=== Ancient Greece ===
The Classical Greek philosopher Plato often used "absurdity" to describe very poor reasoning, or the conclusion from adopting a position that is false and thus reaching a false conclusion, called an "absurdity" (argument by reductio ad absurdum). Plato describes himself as not using absurd argumentation against himself in Parmenides. In Gorgias, Plato refers to an "inevitable absurdity" as the outcome of reasoning from a false assumption.

Aristotle rectified an irrational absurdity in reasoning with empiricism using likelihood, "once the irrational has been introduced and an air of likelihood imparted to it, we must accept it in spite of the absurdity. He claimed that absurdity in reasoning being veiled by charming language in poetry, "As it is, the absurdity is veiled by the poetic charm with which the poet invests it... But in the Epic poem the absurdity passes unnoticed." In Aristotle's book Rhetoric, he discusses the situations in which absurdity is employed and how it affects one's use of persuasion. According to Aristotle, the idea of a man being unable to persuade someone by his words is absurd. Any unnecessary information to the case is unreasonable and makes the speech unclear. If the speech becomes too unclear; the justification for their case becomes unpersuasive, making the argument absurd.

The term absurdity has been used throughout history regarding foolishness and extremely poor reasoning to form beliefs. In Aristophanes' 5th century BC comedy The Wasps, his protagonist Philocleon learned the "absurdities" of Aesop's Fables, considered to be unreasonable fantasy and not real.

=== Renaissance and early modern periods ===
Michel de Montaigne, father of the essay and modern skepticism, argued that the process of abridgement is foolish and produces absurdity, "Every abridgement of a good book is a foolish abridgement... absurdity [is] not to be cured... satisfied with itself than any reason, can reasonably be."

Francis Bacon, an early promoter of empiricism and the scientific method, argued that absurdity is a necessary component of scientific progress, and should not always be laughed at. He continued that bold new ways of thinking and bold hypotheses often led to absurdity, "For if absurdity be the subject of laughter, doubt you but great boldness is seldom without some absurdity."

Thomas Hobbes distinguished absurdity from errors, including basic linguistic errors as when a word is simply used to refer to something which does not have that name. According to Aloysius Martinich: "What Hobbes is worried about is absurdity. Only human beings can embrace an absurdity, because only human beings have language, and philosophers are more susceptible to it than others". Hobbes wrote that "words whereby we conceive nothing but the sound, are those we call absurd, insignificant, and nonsense. And therefore if a man should talk to me of a round quadrangle; or, accidents of bread in cheese; or, immaterial substances; or of a free subject; a free will; or any free, but free from being hindered by opposition, I should not say he were in an error, but that his words were without meaning, that is to say, absurd". He distinguished seven types of absurdity. Below is the summary of Martinich, based on what he describes as Hobbes' "mature account" found in "De Corpore" 5., which all use examples that could be found in Aristotelian or scholastic philosophy, and all reflect "Hobbes' commitment to the new science of Galileo and Harvey". This is known as "Hobbes' Table of Absurdity".

1. "Combining the name of a body with the name of an accident." For example, "existence is a being" or, "a being is existence". These absurdities are typical of scholastic philosophy according to Hobbes.
2. "Combining the name of a body with the name of a phantasm." For example, "a ghost is a body".
3. "Combining the name of a body with the name of a name." For example, "a universal is a thing".
4. "Combining the name of an accident with the name of a phantasm." For example, "colour appears to a perceiver".
5. "Combining the name of an accident with the name of a name." For example, "a definition is the essence of a thing".
6. "Combining the name of a phantasm with the name of a name." For example, "the idea of a man is a universal".
7. "Combining the name of a thing with the name of a speech act." For example, "some entities are beings per se".

According to Martinich, Gilbert Ryle discussed the types of problem Hobbes refers to as absurdities under the term "category error".

Although common usage now considers "absurdity" to be synonymous with "ridiculousness", Hobbes discussed the two concepts as different, in that absurdity is viewed as having to do with invalid reasoning, while ridiculousness has to do with laughter, superiority, and deformity.

=== Philosophy of language ===
G. E. Moore, an English analytic philosopher, cited as a paradox of language such superficially absurd statements as, "I went to the pictures last Tuesday but I don't believe it". They can be true and logically consistent, and are not contradictory on further consideration of the user's linguistic intent. Wittgenstein observes that in some unusual circumstances absurdity itself disappears in such statements, as there are cases where "It is raining but I don't believe it" can make sense, i.e., what appears to be an absurdity is not nonsense.

=== The Absurd ===
In existentialism, absurdism, and related philosophy since the 20th century, absurdity is used in a more specialized way, often termed the absurd: the conflict between the human tendency to seek inherent value and meaning in life, and the human inability to find these with any certainty. The universe and the human mind do not each separately cause the absurd, but rather the absurd arises by the contradictory nature of the two existing simultaneously. Therefore, absurdism, a philosophy most famously associated (posthumously) with Albert Camus, is the belief that the universe is irrational and meaningless, alongside theorizing about the human struggle to create meaning.

Due to the absurd, seeking purpose or meaning in an uncaring world without purpose or meaning may be regarded as either pointless or as still potentially valuable. Seeking to accumulate excessive wealth or pursuing other existential goals in the face of certain death are other concepts discussed by philosophers who contemplate the absurd.

In his paper The Absurd, Thomas Nagel analyzed the perpetual absurdity of human life. Absurdity in life becomes apparent when we realize the fact that we take our lives seriously, while simultaneously perceiving that there is a certain arbitrarity in everything we do. He suggests never to stop searching for the absurd. Furthermore, he suggests searching for irony amongst the absurdity.

== Art and fiction ==
Absurdity has been explored, particularly the absurd (in the above philosophical sense), in certain artistic movements, from literary nonsense to Dada to surrealism to absurdist fiction. Following the Second World War, the Theatre of the Absurd was a notable absurdist fiction movement in the dramatic arts, depicting characters grappling with the meaninglessness of life.

"Theater should be a bloody and inhuman spectacle designed to exercise (sic. exorcise) the spectator's repressed criminal and erotic obsessions.

— Antonin Artaud, The Theatre and Its Double

== Medicine ==
Medical commentators have criticized methods and reasoning in alternative and complementary medicine and integrative medicine as being either absurdities or being between evidence and absurdity. They state it often misleads the public with euphemistic terminology, such as the expressions "alternative medicine" and "complementary medicine", and call for a clear demarcation between valid scientific evidence and scientific methodology and absurdity.

== Theology ==
"I believe because it is absurd"

— Tertullian

Absurdity is cited as a basis for some theological reasoning about the formation of belief and faith, such as in fideism, an epistemological theory that reason and faith may be hostile to each other. The statement "Credo quia absurdum" ("I believe because it is absurd") is attributed to Tertullian from De Carne Christi, as translated by philosopher Voltaire. According to the New Advent Church, what Tertullian said in DCC 5 was "[...] the Son of God died; it is by all means to be believed, because it is absurd."

Absurdity can refer to any strict religious dogma that pushes something to the point of violating common sense. For example, inflexible religious dictates are sometimes termed pharisaism, referring to unreasonable emphasis on observing exact words or rules, rather than the intent or spirit.

Andrew Willet grouped absurdities with "flat contradictions to scripture" and "heresies".

== Psychology ==
Psychologists study how humans adapt to constant absurdities in life. In advertising, the presence or absence of an absurd image was found to moderate negative attitudes toward products and increase product recognition.

== Humor and comedy ==
"I can see nothing" – Alice in Wonderland

"My, you must have good eyes" – Cheshire Cat

Absurdity is used in humor to make people laugh or to make a sophisticated point. One example is Lewis Carroll's "Jabberwocky", a poem of nonsense verse, originally featured as a part of his absurdist novel Through the Looking-Glass, and What Alice Found There (1872). Carroll was a logician and parodied logic using illogic and inverting logical methods. Argentine novelist Jorge Luis Borges used absurdities in his short stories to make points. Franz Kafka's The Metamorphosis is considered absurdist by some.

== Law ==
The absurdity doctrine is a legal theory in American courts. One type of absurdity, known as the "scrivener's error", occurs when simple textual correction is needed to amend an obvious clerical error, such as a misspelled word. Another type of absurdity, called "evaluative absurdity", arises when a legal provision, despite appropriate spelling and grammar, "makes no substantive sense". An example would be a statute that mistakenly provided for a winning rather than losing party to pay the other side's reasonable attorney's fees. In order to stay within the remit of textualism and not reach further into purposivism, the doctrine is restricted by two limiting principles: "...the absurdity and the injustice of applying the provision to the case would be so monstrous, that all mankind would, without hesitation, unite in rejecting the application" and the absurdity must be correctable "...by modifying the text in relatively simple ways". This doctrine is seen as being consistent with examples of historical common sense.

"The common sense of man approves the judgment mentioned by Pufendorf [sic. Puffendorf], that the Bolognian law which enacted 'that whoever drew blood in the streets should be punished with the utmost severity', did not extend to the surgeon who opened the vein of a person that fell down in the street in a fit. The same common sense accepts the ruling, cited by Plowden, that the statute of 1st Edward II, which enacts that a prisoner who breaks prison shall be guilty of a felony, does not extend to a prisoner who breaks out when the prison is on fire – 'for he is not to be hanged because he would not stay to be burnt'."

== Logic and computer science ==
=== Reductio ad absurdum ===
Reductio ad absurdum, reducing to an absurdity, is a method of proof in polemics, logic and mathematics, whereby assuming that a proposition is true leads to absurdity; a proposition is assumed to be true and this is used to deduce a proposition known to be false, so the original proposition must have been false. It is also an argumentation style in polemics, whereby a position is demonstrated to be false, or "absurd", by assuming it and reasoning to reach something known to be believed as false or to violate common sense; it is used by Plato to argue against other philosophical positions. An absurdity constraint is used in the logic of model transformations.

=== Constant in logic ===
The "absurdity constant", often denoted by the symbol ⊥, is used in formal logic. It represents the concept of falsum, an elementary logical proposition, denoted by a constant "false" in several programming languages.

=== Rule in logic ===
The absurdity rule is a rule in logic, as used by Patrick Suppes in Logic, methodology and philosophy of science: Proceedings.

== See also ==
- Doctrine of Absurdity
- Illogical
- Nonsense
- Non sequitur (literary device)
- Ridiculous
- Silliness
- Stupidity
- The Moon is made of green cheese
