= Absurdist =

Absurdist may refer to:

- Absurdism, the philosophical theory that life in general is absurd
- Absurdist fiction, a genre of novels, plays, poems, films, etc. in which the characters cannot find any inherent purpose in life
  - Theatre of the Absurd, Absurdist plays
- Absurdist humour, a synonym of surreal humour

== See also ==
- Absurdity, a thing that is unreasonable or absurd
