= Absurdism =

Theory that life is meaningless

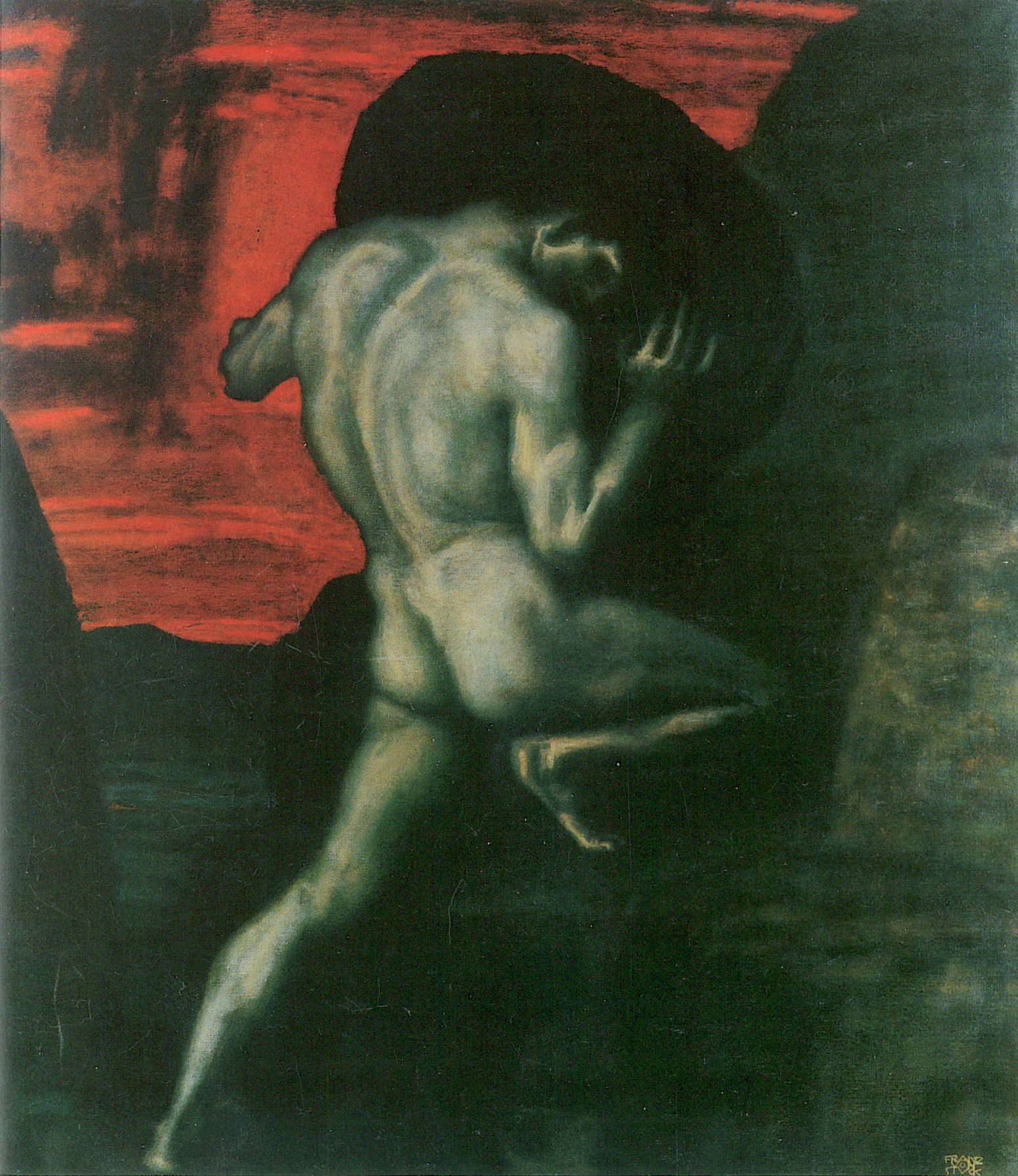
Sisyphus, the symbol of the absurdity of existence, painting by Franz Stuck (1920)

Absurdism is the philosophical theory that the universe is irrational and meaningless. It states that trying to find meaning leads people into conflict with a seemingly meaningless world. This conflict can be between rational humanity and an irrational universe, between intention and outcome, or between subjective assessment and objective worth, but the precise definition of the term is disputed. Absurdism claims that, due to one or more of these conflicts, existence as a whole is absurd. It differs in this regard from the less global thesis that some particular situations, persons, or phases in life are absurd.

Various components of the absurd are discussed in the academic literature, and different theorists frequently concentrate their definition and research on different components. On the practical level, the conflict underlying the absurd is characterized by the individual's struggle to find meaning in a meaningless world. The theoretical component, on the other hand, emphasizes more the epistemic inability of reason to penetrate and understand reality. Traditionally, the conflict is characterized as a collision between an internal component of human nature, and an external component of the universe. However, some later theorists have suggested that both components may be internal: the capacity to see through the arbitrariness of any ultimate purpose, on the one hand, and the incapacity to stop caring about such purposes, on the other hand. Certain accounts also involve a metacognitive component by holding that an awareness of the conflict is necessary for the absurd to arise.

Some arguments in favor of absurdism focus on the human insignificance in the universe, on the role of death, or on the implausibility or irrationality of positing an ultimate purpose. Objections to absurdism often contend that life is in fact meaningful or point out certain problematic consequences or inconsistencies of absurdism. Defenders of absurdism often complain that it does not receive the attention of professional philosophers that it merits in virtue of the topic's importance and its potential psychological impact on the affected individuals in the form of existential crises. Various possible responses to deal with absurdism and its impact have been suggested. The three responses discussed in the traditional absurdist literature are suicide, religious belief in a higher purpose, and rebellion against the absurd. Of these, rebellion is usually presented as the recommended response since, unlike the other two responses, it does not escape the absurd and instead recognizes it for what it is. Later theorists have suggested additional responses, like using irony to take life less seriously or remaining ignorant of the responsible conflict. Some absurdists argue that whether and how one responds is insignificant. This is based on the idea that if nothing really matters, then the human response toward this fact does not matter either.

The term "absurdism" is most closely associated with the philosophy of Albert Camus. However, important precursors and discussions of the absurd are also found in the works of Søren Kierkegaard. Absurdism is intimately related to various other concepts and theories. Its basic outlook is inspired by existentialist philosophy. However, existentialism includes additional theoretical commitments and often takes a more optimistic attitude toward the possibility of finding or creating meaning in one's life. Absurdism and nihilism share the belief that life is meaningless, but absurdists do not treat this as an isolated fact and are instead interested in the conflict between the human desire for meaning and the world's lack thereof. Being confronted with this conflict may trigger an existential crisis, in which unpleasant experiences like anxiety or depression may push the affected to find a response for dealing with the conflict. Recognizing the absence of objective meaning, however, does not preclude the conscious thinker from finding subjective meaning.

== Definition ==
Absurdism is the philosophical thesis that life, or the world in general, is absurd. There is wide agreement that the term "absurd" implies a lack of meaning or purpose, but there is also significant dispute concerning its exact definition and various versions have been suggested. The choice of one's definition has important implications for whether the thesis of absurdism is correct and for the arguments cited for and against it: it may be true on one definition and false on another.

In a general sense, the absurd is that which lacks a sense, often because it involves some form of contradiction. The absurd is paradoxical in the sense that it cannot be grasped by reason. But in the context of absurdism, the term is usually used in a more specific sense. According to most definitions, it involves a conflict, discrepancy, or collision between two things. Opinions differ on what these two things are. For example, it is traditionally identified as the confrontation of rational man with an irrational world or as the attempt to grasp something based on reasons even though it is beyond the limits of rationality. Similar definitions see the discrepancy between intention and outcome, between aspiration and reality, or between subjective assessment and objective worth as the source of absurdity. Other definitions locate both conflicting sides within man: the ability to apprehend the arbitrariness of final ends and the inability to let go of commitments to them. In regard to the conflict, absurdism differs from nihilism since it is not just the thesis that nothing matters. Instead, it includes the component that things seem to matter to us nonetheless and that this impression cannot be shaken off. This difference is expressed in the relational aspect of the absurd in that it constitutes a conflict between two sides.

Various components of the absurd have been suggested and different researchers often focus their definition and inquiry on one of these components. Some accounts emphasize the practical components concerned with the individual seeking meaning while others stress the theoretical components about being unable to know the world or to rationally grasp it. A different disagreement concerns whether the conflict exists only internal to the individual or is between the individual's expectations and the external world. Some theorists also include the metacognitive component that the absurd entails that the individual is aware of this conflict.

An important aspect of absurdism is that the absurd is not limited to particular situations but encompasses life as a whole. There is a general agreement that people are often confronted with absurd situations in everyday life. They often arise when there is a serious mismatch between one's intentions and reality. For example, a person struggling to break down a heavy front door is absurd if the house they are trying to break into lacks a back wall and could easily be entered on this route. But the philosophical thesis of absurdism is much more wide-reaching since it is not restricted to individual situations, persons, or phases in life. Instead, it asserts that life, or the world as a whole, is absurd. The claim that the absurd has such a global extension is controversial, in contrast to the weaker claim that some situations are absurd.

The perspective of absurdism usually comes into view when the agent takes a step back from their individual everyday engagements with the world to assess their importance from a bigger context. Such an assessment can result in the insight that the day-to-day engagements matter a lot to us despite the fact that they lack real meaning when evaluated from a wider perspective. This assessment reveals the conflict between the significance seen from the internal perspective and the arbitrariness revealed through the external perspective. The absurd becomes a problem since there is a strong desire for meaning and purpose even though they seem to be absent. In this sense, the conflict responsible for the absurd often either constitutes or is accompanied by an existential crisis.

== Components ==
=== Practical and theoretical ===
An important component of the absurd on the practical level concerns the seriousness people bring toward life. This seriousness is reflected in many different attitudes and areas, for example, concerning fame, pleasure, justice, knowledge, or survival, both in regard to ourselves as well as in regard to others. This can be understood in terms of importance and caring: it is absurd that people continue to care about these matters even though they seem to lack importance on an objective level. The collision between these two sides can be defined as the absurd. This is perhaps best exemplified when the agent is seriously engaged in choosing between arbitrary options, none of which truly matters.

Some theorists characterize the ethical sides of absurdism and nihilism in the same way as the view that it does not matter how we act or that "everything is permitted." On this view, an important aspect of the absurd is that whatever higher end or purpose we choose to pursue, it can also be put into doubt since, in the last step, it always lacks a higher-order justification. But usually, a distinction between absurdism and nihilism is made since absurdism involves the additional component that there is a conflict between man's desire for meaning and the absence of meaning.

On a more theoretical view, absurdism is the belief that the world is, at its core, indifferent and impenetrable toward human attempts to uncover its deeper reason or that it cannot be known. According to this theoretical component, it involves the epistemological problem of the human limitations of knowing the world. This includes the thesis that the world is in critical ways ungraspable to humans, both in relation to what to believe and how to act. This is reflected in the chaos and irrationality of the universe, which acts according to its own laws in a manner indifferent to human concerns and aspirations. It is closely related to the idea that the world remains silent when we ask why things are the way they are. This silence arises from the impression that, on the most fundamental level, all things exist without a reason: they are simply there. An important aspect of these limitations to knowing the world is that they are essential to human cognition, i.e. they are not due to following false principles or accidental weaknesses but are inherent in the human cognitive faculties themselves.

Some theorists also link this problem to the circularity of human reason, which is very skilled at producing chains of justification linking one thing to another while trying and failing to do the same for the chain of justification as a whole when taking a reflective step backward. This implies that human reason is not just too limited to grasp life as a whole, but that, if one seriously tried to do so anyway, its ungrounded circularity might collapse and lead to madness.

=== Internal and external ===
An important disagreement within the academic literature about the nature of absurdism and the absurd focuses specifically on whether the components responsible for the conflict are internal or external. According to the traditional position, the absurd has both internal and external components: it is due to the discrepancy between man's internal desire to lead a meaningful life and the external meaninglessness of the world. In this view, humans have, among their desires, some transcendent aspirations that seek a higher form of meaning in life. The absurd arises since these aspirations are ignored by the world, which is indifferent to our "need for validation of the importance of our concerns." This implies that the absurd "is not in man ... nor in the world, but in their presence together." This position has been rejected by some later theorists, who hold that the absurd is purely internal because it "derives not from a collision between our expectations and the world, but from a collision within ourselves".

The distinction is important since, on the latter view, the absurd is built into human nature and would prevail no matter what the world was like. So, it is not just that absurdism is true in the actual world. Instead, any possible world, even one that was designed by a divine god and guided by them according to their higher purpose, would still be equally absurd to man. In this sense, absurdity is the product of the power of our consciousness to take a step back from whatever it is considering and reflect on the reason of its object. When this process is applied to the world as a whole, including God, it is bound to fail its search for a reason or an explanation, no matter what the world is like. In this sense, absurdity arises from the conflict between features of ourselves: "our capacity to recognize the arbitrariness of our ultimate concerns and our simultaneous incapacity to relinquish our commitment to them". This view has the side effect that the absurd depends on the fact that the affected person recognizes it. For example, people who fail to apprehend the arbitrariness or the conflict would not be affected.

=== Metacognitive ===
According to some researchers, a central aspect of the absurd is that the agent is aware of the existence of the corresponding conflict. This means that the person is conscious both of the seriousness they invest and of how it seems misplaced in an arbitrary world. It also implies that other entities that lack this form of consciousness, like non-organic matter or lower life forms, are not absurd and are not faced with this particular problem. Some theorists also emphasize that the conflict remains despite the individual's awareness of it, i.e. that the individual continues to care about their everyday concerns despite their impression that, on the large scale, these concerns are meaningless. Defenders of the metacognitive component have argued that it manages to explain why absurdity is primarily ascribed to human aspirations but not to lower animals: because they lack this metacognitive awareness. However, other researchers reject the metacognitive requirement based on the fact that it would severely limit the scope of the absurd to only those possibly few individuals who clearly recognize the contradiction while sparing the rest. Thus, opponents have argued that not recognizing the conflict is just as absurd as consciously living through it.

== Arguments ==
=== For ===
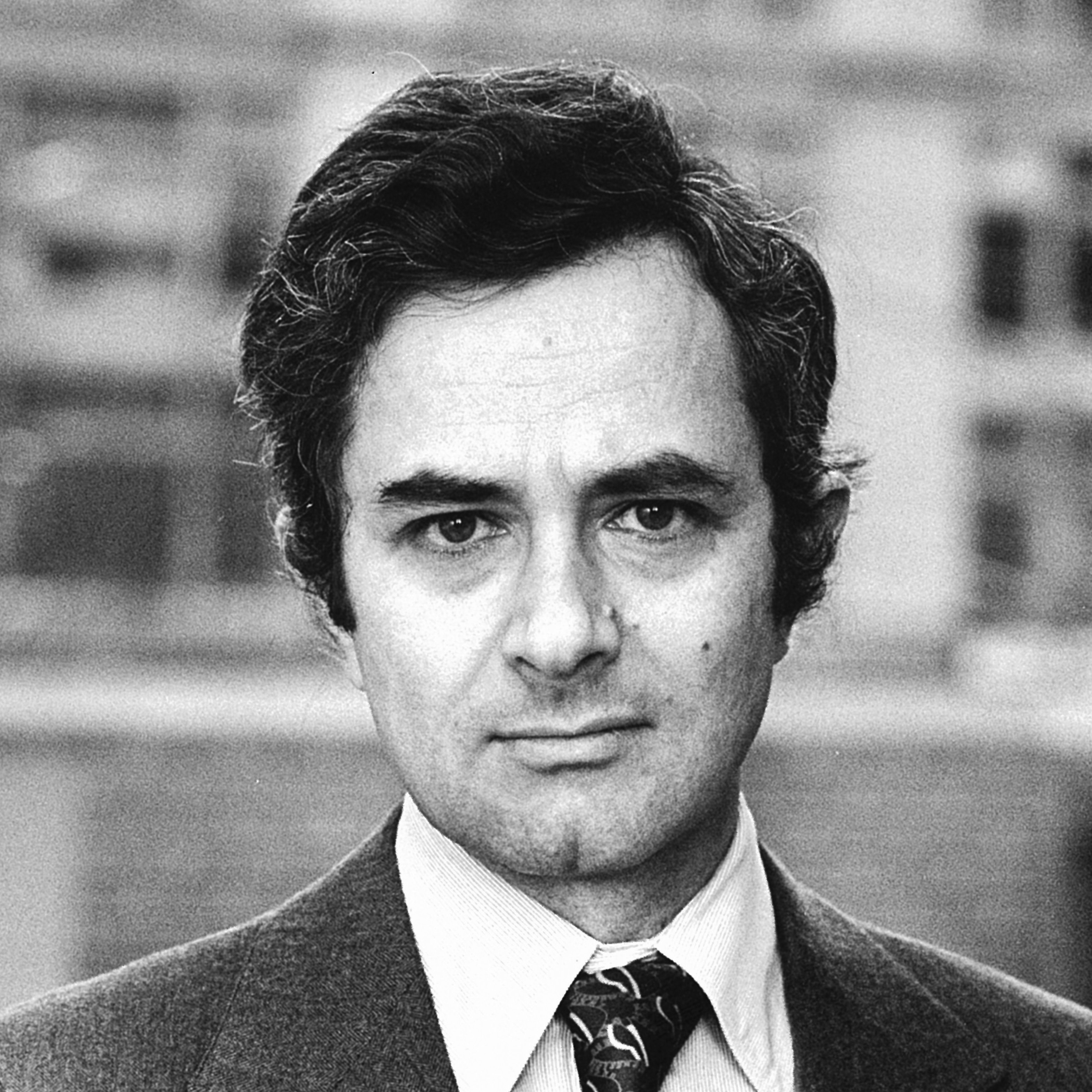
Thomas Nagel examined the nature of the absurd, considering arguments and responses to it.

Various popular arguments are often cited in favor of absurdism. Some focus on the future by pointing out that nothing we do today will matter in a million years. A similar line of argument points to the fact that our lives are insignificant because of how small they are in relation to the universe as a whole, both concerning their spatial and their temporal dimensions. The thesis of absurdism is also sometimes based on the problem of death, i.e. that there is no final end for us to pursue since we are all going to die. In this sense, death is said to destroy all our hard-earned achievements like career, wealth, or knowledge. This argument is mitigated to some extent by the fact that we may have positive or negative effects on the lives of other people as well. But this does not fully solve the issue since the same problem, i.e. the lack of an ultimate end, applies to their lives as well. Thomas Nagel has objected to these lines of argument based on the claim that they are circular: they assume rather than establish that life is absurd. For example, the claim that our actions today will not matter in a million years does not directly imply that they do not matter today. And similarly, the fact that a process does not reach a meaningful ultimate goal does not entail that the process as a whole is worthless since some parts of the process may contain their justification without depending on a justification external to them.

Another argument proceeds indirectly by pointing out how various great thinkers have obvious irrational elements in their systems of thought. These purported mistakes of reason are then taken as signs of absurdism that were meant to hide or avoid it. From this perspective, the tendency to posit the existence of a benevolent God may be seen as a form of defense mechanism or wishful thinking to avoid an unsettling and inconvenient truth. This is closely related to the idea that humans have an inborn desire for meaning and purpose, which is dwarfed by a meaningless and indifferent universe. For example, René Descartes aims to build a philosophical system based on the absolute certainty of the "I think, therefore I am" just to introduce without a proper justification the existence of a benevolent and non-deceiving God in a later step in order to ensure that we can know about the external world. A similar problematic step is taken by John Locke, who accepts the existence of a God beyond sensory experience, despite his strict empiricism, which demands that all knowledge be based on sensory experience.

Other theorists argue in favor of absurdism based on the claim that meaning is relational. In this sense, for something to be meaningful, it has to stand in relation to something else that is meaningful. For example, a word is meaningful because of its relation to a language or someone's life could be meaningful because this person dedicates their efforts to a higher meaningful project, like serving God or fighting poverty. An important consequence of this characterization of meaning is that it threatens to lead to an infinite regress: at each step, something is meaningful because something else is meaningful, which in its turn has meaning only because it is related to yet another meaningful thing, and so on. This infinite chain and the corresponding absurdity could be avoided if some things had intrinsic or ultimate meaning, i.e. if their meaning did not depend on the meaning of something else. For example, if things on the large scale, like God or fighting poverty, had meaning, then our everyday engagements could be meaningful by standing in the right relation to them. However, if these wider contexts themselves lack meaning then they are unable to act as sources of meaning for other things. This would lead to the absurd when understood as the conflict between the impression that our everyday engagements are meaningful even though they lack meaning because they do not stand in a relation to something else that is meaningful.

Another argument for absurdism is based on the attempt of assessing standards of what matters and why it matters. It has been argued that the only way to answer such a question is in reference to these standards themselves. This means that, in the end, it depends only on us, that "what seems to us important or serious or valuable would not seem so if we were differently constituted". The circularity and groundlessness of these standards themselves are then used to argue for absurdism.

=== Against ===
The most common criticism of absurdism is to argue that life in fact has meaning. Supernaturalist arguments to this effect are based on the claim that God exists and acts as the source of meaning. Naturalist arguments, on the other hand, contend that various sources of meaning can be found in the natural world without recourse to a supernatural realm. Some of them hold that meaning is subjective. On this view, whether a given thing is meaningful varies from person to person based on their subjective attitude toward this thing. Others find meaning in external values, for example, in morality, knowledge, or beauty. All these different positions have in common that they affirm the existence of meaning, in contrast to absurdism.

Another criticism of absurdism focuses on its negative attitude toward moral values. In the absurdist literature, the moral dimension is sometimes outright denied, for example, by holding that value judgments are to be discarded or that the rejection of God implies the rejection of moral values. On this view, absurdism brings with it a highly controversial form of moral nihilism. This means that there is a lack, not just of a higher purpose in life, but also of moral values. These two sides can be linked by the idea that without a higher purpose, nothing is worth pursuing that could give one's life meaning. This worthlessness seems to apply to morally relevant actions equally as to other issues. In this sense, "[b]elief in the meaning of life always implies a scale of values" while "[b]elief in the absurd ... teaches the contrary". Various objections to such a position have been presented, for example, that it violates common sense or that it leads to numerous radical consequences, like that no one is ever guilty of any blameworthy behavior or that there are no ethical rules.

But this negative attitude toward moral values is not always consistently maintained by absurdists and some of the suggested responses on how to deal with the absurd seem to explicitly defend the existence of moral values. Due to this ambiguity, other critics of absurdism have objected to it based on its inconsistency. The moral values defended by absurdists often overlap with the ethical outlook of existentialism and include traits like sincerity, authenticity, and courage as virtues. In this sense, absurdists often argue that it matters how the agent faces the absurdity of their situation and that the response should exemplify these virtues. This aspect is particularly prominent in the idea that the agent should rebel against the absurd and live their life authentically as a form of passionate revolt.

Some see the latter position as inconsistent with the idea that there is no meaning in life: if nothing matters then it should also not matter how we respond to this fact. Defenders of absurdism have tried to resist this line of argument by contending that, in contrast to other responses, it remains true to the basic insight of absurdism and the "logic of the absurd" by acknowledging the existence of the absurd instead of denying it. But this defense is not always accepted. One of its shortcomings seems to be that it commits the is-ought fallacy: absurdism presents itself as a descriptive claim about the existence and nature of the absurd but then goes on to posit various normative claims. Another defense of absurdism consists in weakening the claims about how one should respond to the absurd and which virtues such a response should exemplify. On this view, absurdism may be understood as a form of self-help that merely provides prudential advice. Such prudential advice may be helpful to certain people without pretending to have the status of universally valid moral values or categorical normative judgments. So the value of the prudential advice may merely be relative to the interests of some people but not valuable in a more general sense. This way, absurdists have tried to resolve the apparent inconsistency in their position.

== Examples ==
According to absurdism, life in general is absurd: the absurd is not just limited to a few specific cases. Nonetheless, some cases are more paradigmatic examples than others. The Myth of Sisyphus is often treated as a key example of the absurd. In it, Zeus punishes King Sisyphus by compelling him to roll a massive boulder up a hill. Whenever the boulder reaches the top, it rolls down again, thereby forcing Sisyphus to repeat the same task all over again throughout eternity. This story may be seen as an absurdist parable for the hopelessness and futility of human life in general: just like Sisyphus, humans in general are condemned to toil day in and day out in the attempt to fulfill pointless tasks, which will be replaced by new pointless tasks once they are completed. It has been argued that a central aspect of Sisyphus' situation is not just the futility of his labor but also his awareness of the futility.

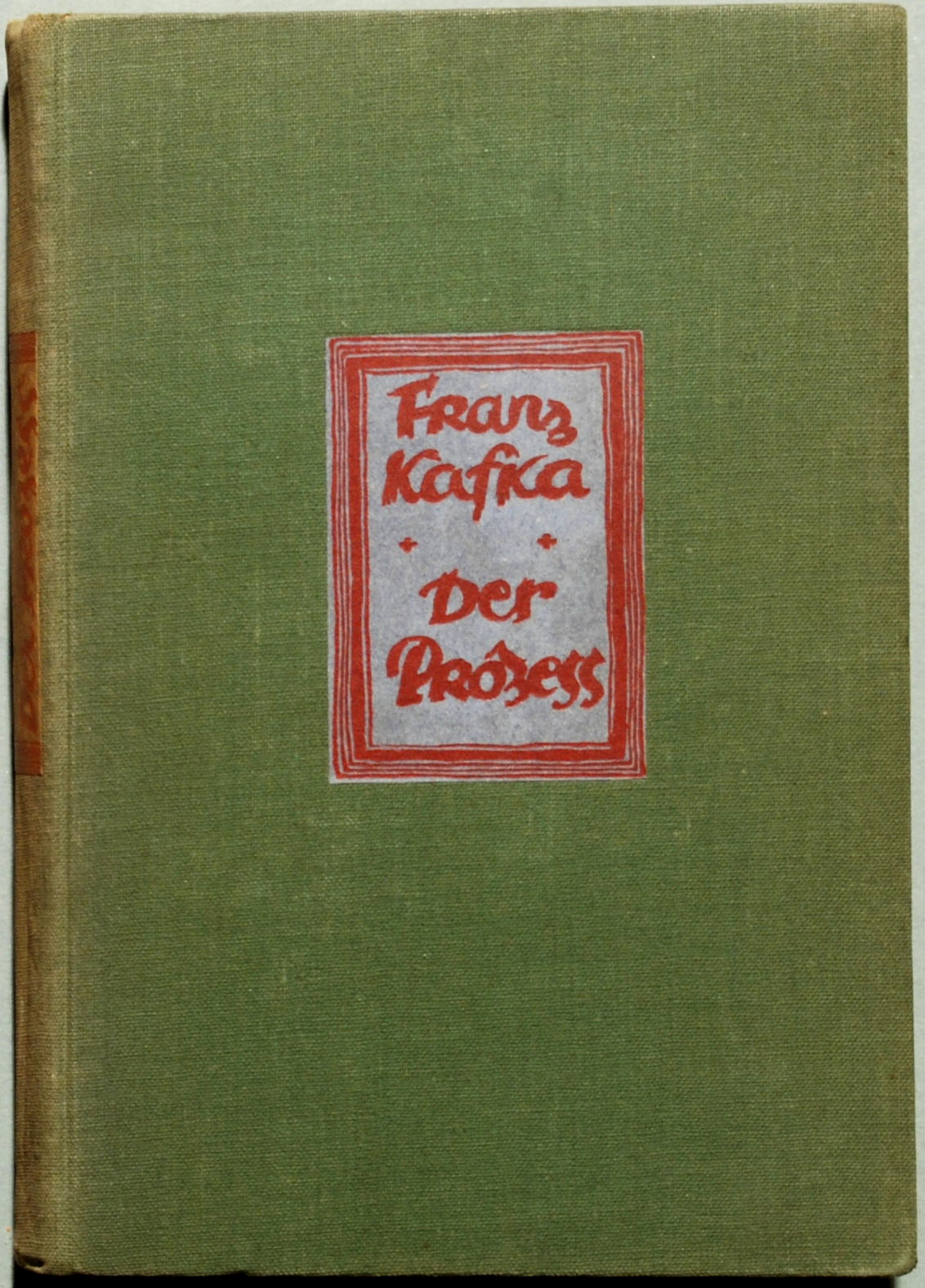
Franz Kafka's book The Trial (German: Der Prozess) examines the absurdity of life through the lens of an impenetrable judicial system.

Another example of the absurdist aspect of the human condition is given in Franz Kafka's The Trial. In it, the protagonist Josef K. is arrested and prosecuted by an inaccessible authority even though he is convinced that he has done nothing wrong. Throughout the story, he desperately tries to discover what crimes he is accused of and how to defend himself. But in the end, he lets go of his futile attempts and submits to his execution without ever finding out what he was accused of. The absurd nature of the world is exemplified by the mysterious and impenetrable functioning of the judicial system, which seems indifferent to Josef K. and resists all of his attempts of making sense of it.

== Importance ==
Philosophers of absurdism often complain that the topic of the absurd does not receive the attention of professional philosophers it merits, especially when compared to other perennial philosophical areas of inquiry. It has been argued, for example, that this can be seen in the tendency of various philosophers throughout the ages to include the epistemically dubitable existence of God in their philosophical systems as a source of ultimate explanation of the mysteries of existence. In that regard, this tendency may be seen as a form of defense mechanism or wishful thinking constituting a side-effect of the unacknowledged and ignored importance of the absurd. While some discussions of absurdism happen explicitly in the philosophical literature, it is often presented in a less explicit manner in the form of novels or plays. These presentations usually happen by telling stories that exemplify some of the key aspects of absurdism even though they may not explicitly discuss the topic.

It has been argued that acknowledging the existence of the absurd has important consequences for epistemology, especially in relation to philosophy but also when applied more widely to other fields. The reason for this is that acknowledging the absurd includes becoming aware of human cognitive limitations and may lead to a form of epistemic humbleness.

The impression that life is absurd may in some cases have serious psychological consequences like triggering an existential crisis. In this regard, an awareness both of absurdism itself and the possible responses to it can be central to avoiding or resolving such consequences.

== Possible responses ==
... in spite of or in defiance of the whole of existence he wills to be himself with it, to take it along, almost defying his torment. For to hope in the possibility of help, not to speak of help by virtue of the absurd, that for God all things are possible—no, that he will not do. And as for seeking help from any other—no, that he will not do for all the world; rather than seek help he would prefer to be himself—with all the tortures of hell, if so it must be.

— Søren Kierkegaard, The Sickness Unto Death

Most researchers argue that the basic conflict posed by the absurd cannot be truly resolved. This means that any attempt to do so is bound to fail even though their protagonists may not be aware of their failure. On this view, there are still several possible responses, some better than others, but none able to solve the fundamental conflict. Traditional absurdism, as exemplified by Albert Camus, holds that there are three possible responses to absurdism: suicide, religious belief, or revolting against the absurd. Later researchers have suggested more ways of responding to absurdism.

A very blunt and simple response, though quite radical, is to commit suicide. According to Camus, for example, the problem of suicide is the only "really serious philosophical problem". It consists in seeking an answer to the question "Should I kill myself?". This response is motivated by the insight that, no matter how hard the agent tries, they may never reach their goal of leading a meaningful life, which can then justify the rejection of continuing to live at all. Most researchers acknowledge that this is one form of response to the absurd but reject it due to its radical and irreversible nature and argue instead for a different approach.

One such alternative response to the apparent absurdity of life is to assume that there is some higher ultimate purpose in which the individual may participate, like service to society, progress of history, or God's glory. While the individual may only play a small part in the realization of this overarching purpose, it may still act as a source of meaning. This way, the individual may find meaning and thereby escape the absurd. One serious issue with this approach is that the problem of absurdity applies to this alleged higher purpose as well. So just like the aims of a single individual life can be put into doubt, this applies equally to a larger purpose shared by many. And if this purpose is itself absurd, it fails to act as a source of meaning for the individual participating in it. Camus identifies this response as a form of suicide as well, pertaining not to the physical but to the philosophical level. It is a philosophical suicide in the sense that the individual just assumes that the chosen higher purpose is meaningful and thereby fails to reflect on its absurdity.

Traditional absurdists usually reject both physical and philosophical suicide as the recommended response to the absurd, usually with the argument that both these responses constitute some form of escape that fails to face the absurd for what it is. Despite the gravity and inevitability of the absurd, they recommend that we should face it directly, i.e. not escape from it by retreating into the illusion of false hope or by ending one's life. In this sense, accepting the reality of the absurd means rejecting any hopes for a happy afterlife free of those contradictions. Instead, the individual should acknowledge the absurd and engage in a rebellion against it. Such a revolt usually exemplifies certain virtues closely related to existentialism, like the affirmation of one's freedom in the face of adversity as well as accepting responsibility and defining one's own essence. An important aspect of this lifestyle is that life is lived passionately and intensely by inviting and seeking new experiences. Such a lifestyle might be exemplified by an actor, a conqueror, or a seduction artist who is constantly on the lookout for new roles, conquests, or attractive people despite their awareness of the absurdity of these enterprises. Another aspect lies in creativity, i.e. that the agent sees themselves as and acts as the creator of their own works and paths in life. This constitutes a form of rebellion in the sense that the agent remains aware of the absurdity of the world and their part in it but keeps on opposing it instead of resigning and admitting defeat. But this response does not solve the problem of the absurd at its core: even a life dedicated to the rebellion against the absurd is itself still absurd. Defenders of the rebellious response to absurdism have pointed out that, despite its possible shortcomings, it has one important advantage over many of its alternatives: it manages to accept the absurd for what it is without denying it by rejecting that it exists or by stopping one's own existence. Some even hold that it is the only philosophically coherent response to the absurd.

While these three responses are the most prominent ones in the traditional absurdist literature, various other responses have also been suggested. Instead of rebellion, for example, absurdism may also lead to a form of irony. This irony is not sufficient to escape the absurdity of life altogether, but it may mitigate it to some extent by distancing oneself to some degree from the seriousness of life. According to Thomas Nagel, there may be, at least theoretically, two responses to actually resolving the problem of the absurd. This is based on the idea that the absurd arises from the consciousness of a conflict between two aspects of human life: that humans care about various things and that the world seems arbitrary and does not merit this concern. The absurd would not arise if either of the conflicting elements would cease to exist, i.e. if the individual would stop caring about things, as some Eastern religions seem to suggest, or if one could find something that possesses a non-arbitrary meaning that merits the concern. For theorists who give importance to the consciousness of this conflict for the absurd, a further option presents itself: to remain ignorant of it to the extent that this is possible.

Other theorists hold that a proper response to the absurd may neither be possible nor necessary, that it just remains one of the basic aspects of life no matter how it is confronted. This lack of response may be justified through the thesis of absurdism itself: if nothing really matters on the grand scale, then this applies equally to human responses toward this fact. From this perspective, the passionate rebellion against an apparently trivial or unimportant state of affairs seems less like a heroic quest and more like a fool's errand. Jeffrey Gordon has objected to this criticism based on the claim that there is a difference between absurdity and lack of importance. So even if life as a whole is absurd, some facts about life may still be more important than others and the fact that life as a whole is absurd would be a good candidate for the more important facts.

== History ==
Certain precursors to absurdism are found in Ecclesiastes, a book of the Bible, and in the works of William Shakespeare. Absurdism has its origins in the work of the 19th-century Danish philosopher Søren Kierkegaard, who chose to confront the crisis that humans face with the Absurd by developing his own existentialist philosophy. Absurdism as a belief system was born of the European existentialist movement that ensued, specifically when Camus rejected certain aspects of that philosophical line of thought and published his essay The Myth of Sisyphus. The aftermath of World War II provided the social environment that stimulated absurdist views and allowed for their popular development, especially in the devastated country of France. Foucault viewed Shakespearean theater as a precursor of absurdism.

=== Immanuel Kant ===
An idea very close to the concept of the absurd is due to Immanuel Kant, who distinguishes between phenomena and noumena. This distinction refers to the gap between how things appear to us and what they are like in themselves. For example, according to Kant, space and times are dimensions belonging to the realm of phenomena since this is how sensory impressions are organized by the mind, but may not be found on the level of noumena. The concept of the absurd corresponds to the thesis that there is such a gap and human limitations may limit the mind from ever truly grasping reality, i.e. that reality in this sense remains absurd to the mind.

=== Søren Kierkegaard ===
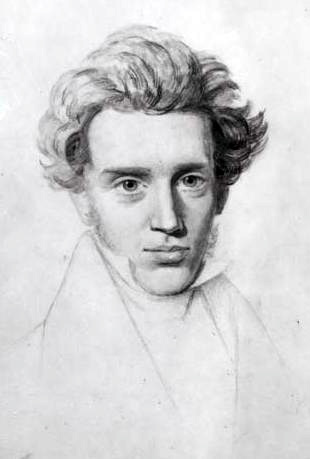
Kierkegaard designed the relationship framework based (in part) on how a person reacts to despair. Absurdist philosophy fits into the 'despair of defiance' rubric.

A century before Camus, the 19th-century Danish philosopher Søren Kierkegaard wrote extensively about the absurdity of the world. In his journals, Kierkegaard writes about the absurd:

What is the Absurd? It is, as may quite easily be seen, that I, a rational being, must act in a case where my reason, my powers of reflection, tell me: you can just as well do the one thing as the other, that is to say where my reason and reflection say: you cannot act and yet here is where I have to act... The Absurd, or to act by virtue of the absurd, is to act upon faith ... I must act, but reflection has closed the road so I take one of the possibilities and say: This is what I do, I cannot do otherwise because I am brought to a standstill by my powers of reflection.

— Kierkegaard, Søren, Journals, 1849

Here is another example of the Absurd from his writings:

What, then, is the absurd? The absurd is that the eternal truth has come into existence in time, that God has come into existence, has been born, has grown up. etc., has come into existence exactly as an individual human being, indistinguishable from any other human being, in as much as all immediate recognizability is pre-Socratic paganism and from the Jewish point of view is idolatry.

— Kierkegaard, Concluding Unscientific Postscript, 1846, Hong 1992, p. 210

How can this absurdity be held or believed? Kierkegaard says:

I gladly undertake, by way of brief repetition, to emphasize what other pseudonyms have emphasized. The absurd is not the absurd or absurdities without any distinction (wherefore Johannes de Silentio: "How many of our age understand what the absurd is?"). The absurd is a category, and the most developed thought is required to define the Christian absurd accurately and with conceptual correctness. The absurd is a category, the negative criterion, of the divine or of the relationship to the divine. When the believer has faith, the absurd is not the absurd—faith transforms it, but in every weak moment it is again more or less absurd to him. The passion of faith is the only thing which masters the absurd—if not, then faith is not faith in the strictest sense, but a kind of knowledge. The absurd terminates negatively before the sphere of faith, which is a sphere by itself. To a third person the believer relates himself by virtue of the absurd; so must a third person judge, for a third person does not have the passion of faith. Johannes de Silentio has never claimed to be a believer; just the opposite, he has explained that he is not a believer—in order to illuminate faith negatively.

— Journals of Søren Kierkegaard X6B 79

Kierkegaard provides an example in Fear and Trembling (1843), which was published under the pseudonym Johannes de Silentio. In the story of Abraham in the Book of Genesis, Abraham is told by God to kill his son Isaac. Just as Abraham is about to kill Isaac, an angel stops Abraham from doing so. Kierkegaard believes that through virtue of the absurd, Abraham, defying all reason and ethical duties ("you cannot act"), got back his son and reaffirmed his faith ("where I have to act").

Another instance of absurdist themes in Kierkegaard's work appears in The Sickness Unto Death, which Kierkegaard signed with pseudonym Anti-Climacus. Exploring the forms of despair, Kierkegaard examines the type of despair known as defiance. In the opening quotation reproduced at the beginning of the article, Kierkegaard describes how such a man would endure such a defiance and identifies the three major traits of the Absurd Man, later discussed by Albert Camus: a rejection of escaping existence (suicide), a rejection of help from a higher power and acceptance of his absurd (and despairing) condition.

According to Kierkegaard in his autobiography The Point of View of My Work as an Author, most of his pseudonymous writings are not necessarily reflective of his own opinions. Nevertheless, his work anticipated many absurdist themes and provided its theoretical background.

=== Albert Camus ===
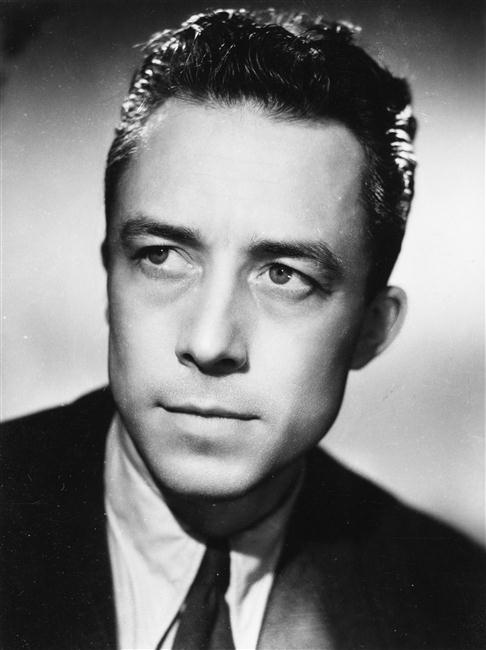
Albert Camus in 1945

The philosophy of Albert Camus, or more precisely the "camusian absurd" (French : l'absurde camusien), refers with absurdism to the work and philosophical thought of the French writer Albert Camus. This philosophy is influenced by the author's political, libertarian, social and ecological ideas; and is inspired by previous philosophical trends, such as Greek philosophy, nihilism, the Nietzschean thought or existentialism. It revolves around three major cycles: "the absurd (l'absurde)", "the revolt (la révolte)" and "love (l'amour)". Each cycle is linked to a Greek myth (Sisyphus, Prometheus, Nemesis) and explores specific themes and objects; the common thread remaining the solitude and despair of the human, constantly driven by the tireless search for the meaning of the world and of life.

I had a precise plan when I started my work: I wanted to first express negation. In three forms. Romanesque: it was The Stranger. Drama: Caligula and The Misunderstanding. Ideological: The Myth of Sisyphus. I wouldn't have been able to talk about it if I hadn't experienced it; I have no imagination. But for me it was, if you like, the methodical doubt of Descartes. I knew that we cannot live in negation and I announced it in the preface to the Myth of Sisyphus; I anticipated the positive in all three forms again. Romance: The Plague. Drama: The State of Siege and The Righteous. Ideological: The Rebel. I already saw a third layer around the theme of love. These are the projects I have in progress

— Albert Camus at Stockholm in 1957, quoted by Roger Quilliot in Essais, II, p. 1610.

The cycle of the absurd, or negation, primarily addresses suicide and the human condition. It is expressed through four of Camus's works: the novel The Stranger and the essay The Myth of Sisyphus (1942), then the plays Caligula and The Misunderstanding (1944). By refusing the refuge of belief, Human becomes aware that his existence revolves around repetitive and meaningless acts. The certainty of death only reinforces, according to the writer, the feeling of uselessness of all existence. The absurd is therefore the feeling that man feels when confronted with the absence of meaning in the face of the Universe, the painful realization of his separation from the world. The question then arises of the legitimacy of suicide.

The cycle of revolt, called the positive, is a direct response to the absurd and is also expressed by four of his works: the novel The Plague (1947), the plays The State of Siege (1948) and The Just Assassins (1949), then the essay The Rebel (1951). Positive concept of affirmation of the individual, where only action and commitment count in the face of the tragedy of the world, revolt is for the writer the way of experiencing the absurd, knowing our fatal destiny and nevertheless facing it : "Man refuses the world as it is, without agreeing to escape it." It is intelligence grappling with the "unreasonable silence of the world". Depriving ourselves of eternal life frees us from the constraints imposed by an improbable future; Man gains freedom of action, lucidity and dignity.

The philosophy of Camus therefore has as its finitude a singular humanism. Advancing a message of lucidity, resilience and emancipation in the face of the absurdity of life, it encourages people to create their own meanings through personal choices and commitments, and to embrace their freedom to the fullest. Because he affirms that, even in the absurd, there is room for passion and rebellion; and although the Universe may be indifferent to our search for meaning, this search is in itself meaningful. In The Myth of Sisyphus, despite his absurd destiny, Sisyphus finds a form of liberation in his incessant work: "one must imagine Sisyphus happy". With the cycle of love and the "midday thought" (French: la pensée de midi), the philosophy of the absurd is completed by a principle of measurement and pleasure, close to Epicureanism.

Though the notion of the 'absurd' pervades all Albert Camus's writing, The Myth of Sisyphus is his chief work on the subject. In it, Camus considers absurdity as a confrontation, an opposition, a conflict or a "divorce" between two ideals. Specifically, he defines the human condition as absurd, as the confrontation between man's desire for significance, meaning and clarity on the one hand—and the silent, cold universe on the other. He continues that there are specific human experiences evoking notions of absurdity. Such a realization or encounter with the absurd leaves the individual with a choice: suicide, a leap of faith, or recognition. He concludes that recognition is the only defensible option.

For Camus, suicide is a "confession" that life is not worth living; it is a choice that implicitly declares that life is "too much." Suicide offers the most basic "way out" of absurdity: the immediate termination of the self and its place in the universe.

The absurd encounter can also arouse a "leap of faith," a term derived from one of Kierkegaard's early pseudonyms, Johannes de Silentio (although the term was not used by Kierkegaard himself), where one believes that there is more than the rational life (aesthetic or ethical). To take a "leap of faith," one must act with the "virtue of the absurd" (as Johannes de Silentio put it), where a suspension of the ethical may need to exist. This faith has no expectations, but is a flexible power initiated by a recognition of the absurd. Camus states that because the leap of faith escapes rationality and defers to abstraction over personal experience, the leap of faith is not absurd. Camus considers the leap of faith as "philosophical suicide," rejecting both this and physical suicide.

Lastly, a person can choose to embrace the absurd condition. According to Camus, one's freedom—and the opportunity to give life meaning—lies in the recognition of absurdity. If the absurd experience is truly the realization that the universe is fundamentally devoid of absolutes, then we as individuals are truly free. "To live without appeal," as he puts it, is a philosophical move to define absolutes and universals subjectively, rather than objectively. The freedom of man is thus established in one's natural ability and opportunity to create their own meaning and purpose; to decide (or think) for oneself. The individual becomes the most precious unit of existence, representing a set of unique ideals that can be characterized as an entire universe in its own right. In acknowledging the absurdity of seeking any inherent meaning, but continuing this search regardless, one can be happy, gradually developing meaning from the search alone. "Happiness and the absurd are two sons of the same earth. They are inseparable."

Camus states in The Myth of Sisyphus: "Thus I draw from the absurd three consequences, which are my revolt, my freedom, and my passion. By the mere activity of consciousness I transform into a rule of life what was an invitation to death, and I refuse suicide." "Revolt" here refers to the refusal of suicide and search for meaning despite the revelation of the Absurd; "Freedom" refers to the lack of imprisonment by religious devotion or others' moral codes; "Passion" refers to the most wholehearted experiencing of life, since hope has been rejected, and so he concludes that every moment must be lived fully.

== Relation to other concepts ==
=== Existentialism and nihilism ===
Absurdism originated from (as well as alongside) the 20th-century strains of existentialism and nihilism; it shares some prominent starting points with both, though also entails conclusions that are uniquely distinct from these other schools of thought. All three arose from the human experience of anguish and confusion stemming from existence: the apparent meaninglessness of a world in which humans, nevertheless, are compelled to find or create meaning. The three schools of thought diverge from there. Existentialists have generally advocated the individual's construction of their own meaning in life as well as the free will of the individual. Nihilists, on the contrary, contend that "it is futile to seek or to affirm meaning where none can be found." Absurdists, following Camus' formulation, hesitantly allow the possibility for some meaning or value in life, but are neither as certain as existentialists are about the value of one's own constructed meaning nor as nihilists are about the total inability to create meaning. It has been argued, moreover, that the absurdist interpretation of the demand for meaning as an essential feature of being human is incompatible with the existentialist idea that human beings have no essential normative features; others have argued that the demand need not be essential in order to grant life its absurdity. Absurdists following Camus also devalue or outright reject free will, encouraging merely that the individual live defiantly and authentically in spite of the psychological tension of the Absurd.

Camus himself passionately worked to counter nihilism, as he explained in his essay "The Rebel", while he also categorically rejected the label of "existentialist" in his essay "Enigma" and in the compilation The Lyrical and Critical Essays of Albert Camus, though he was, and still is, often broadly characterized by others as an existentialist. Both existentialism and absurdism entail consideration of the practical applications of becoming conscious of the truth of existential nihilism: i.e., how a driven seeker of meaning should act when suddenly confronted with the seeming concealment, or downright absence, of meaning in the universe.

While absurdism can be seen as a kind of response to existentialism, it can be debated exactly how substantively the two positions differ from each other. The existentialist, after all, does not deny the reality of death. But the absurdist seems to reaffirm the way in which death ultimately nullifies our meaning-making activities, a conclusion the existentialists seem to resist through various notions of posterity or, in Sartre's case, participation in a grand humanist project.

=== Existential crisis ===
The basic problem of absurdism is usually not encountered through a dispassionate philosophical inquiry but as the manifestation of an existential crisis. Existential crises are inner conflicts in which the individual wrestles with the impression that life lacks meaning. They are accompanied by various negative experiences, such as stress, anxiety, despair, and depression, which can disturb the individual's normal functioning in everyday life. In this sense, the conflict underlying the absurdist perspective poses a psychological challenge to the affected. This challenge is due to the impression that the agent's vigorous daily engagement stands in incongruity with its apparent insignificance encountered through philosophical reflection. Realizing this incongruity is usually not a pleasant occurrence and may lead to estrangement, alienation, and hopelessness. The intimate relation to psychological crises is also manifested in the problem of finding the right response to this unwelcome conflict, for example, by denying it, by taking life less seriously, or by revolting against the absurd. But accepting the position of absurdism may also have certain positive psychological effects. In this sense, it can help the individual achieve a certain psychological distance from unexamined dogmas and thus help them evaluate their situation from a more encompassing and objective perspective. However, it brings with it the danger of leveling all significant differences and thereby making it difficult for the individual to decide what to do or how to live their life.

=== Epistemological skepticism ===
It has been argued that absurdism in the practical domain resembles epistemological skepticism in the theoretical domain. In the case of epistemology, we usually take for granted our knowledge of the world around us even though, when methodological doubt is applied, it turns out that this knowledge is not as unshakable as initially assumed. For example, the agent may decide to trust their perception that the sun is shining but its reliability depends on the assumption that the agent is not dreaming, which they would not know even if they were dreaming. In a similar sense in the practical domain, the agent may decide to take aspirin in order to avoid a headache even though they may be unable to give a reason for why they should be concerned with their own wellbeing at all. In both cases, the agent goes ahead with a form of unsupported natural confidence and takes life largely for granted despite the fact that their power to justify is only limited to a rather small range and fails when applied to the larger context, on which the small range depends.

=== Education ===
It has been argued that absurdism is opposed to various fundamental principles and assumptions guiding education, like the importance of truth and of fostering rationality in the students.

== See also ==
- Absurdistan
- Absurdist fiction
- Church of the SubGenius
- Cognitive dissonance
- Credo quia absurdum
- Depersonalization-derealization disorder
- Discordianism
- Don Quixote
- Fact–value distinction
- Kafkaesque
- Lottery of birth
- Meaning (non-linguistic)
- Non sequitur (literary device)
- Pataphysics
- Peter Wessel Zapffe
- Philosophical pessimism
- Self-estrangement
- Theatre of the Absurd
- Terror management theory
- Use–mention distinction
