= Apologeticus =

Book by Tertullianus

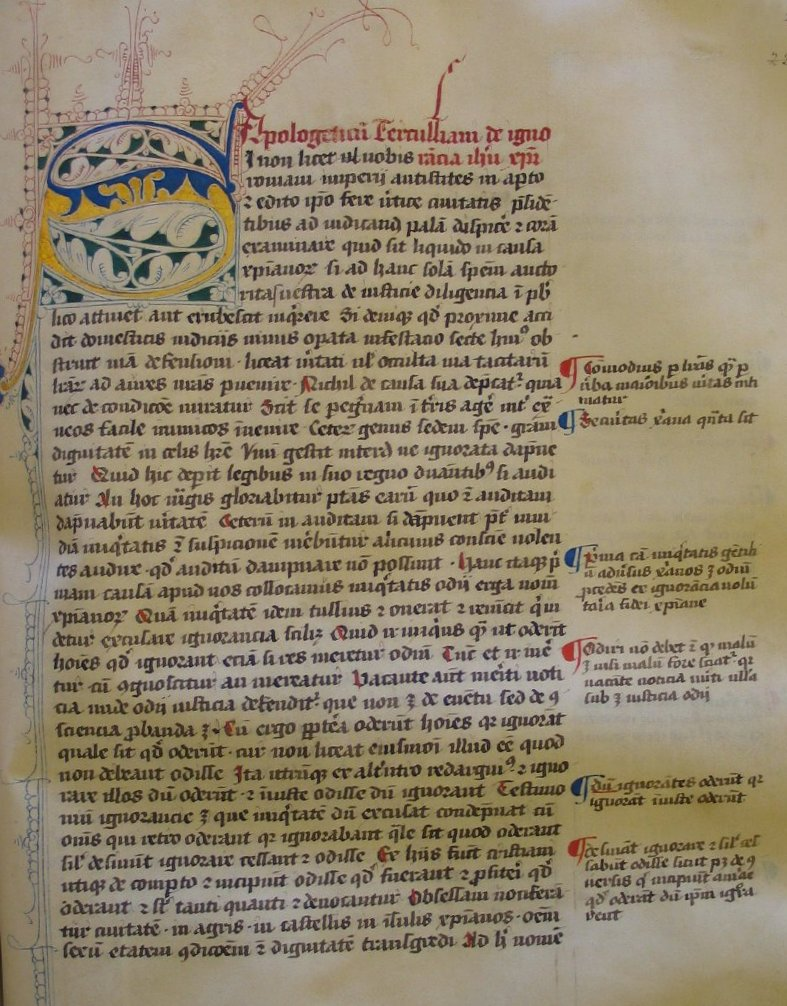
A manuscript of Tertullian's Apologeticus from the 1440s.

Apologeticus (Latin: Apologeticum or Apologeticus) is a text attributed to Tertullian according to Christian tradition, consisting of apologetic and polemic. In this work Tertullian defends Christianity, demanding legal toleration and that Christians be treated like all other sects of the Roman Empire. It is in this treatise that one finds the sentence "Plures efficimur, quotiens metimur a vobis: semen est sanguis Christianorum," which has been liberally and apocryphally translated as "the blood of the martyrs is the seed of the Church" (Apologeticus, L.13). Alexander Souter translated this phrase as "We spring up in greater numbers the more we are mown down by you: the blood of the Christians is the seed of a new life," but even this takes liberties with the original text. "We multiply when you reap us. The blood of Christians is seed," is perhaps a more faithful, if less poetic, rendering. Tertullian says Christians, ends deliberately on the single open word semen — seed — and leaves the reader to complete the image themselves. The simplest and most faithful rendering remains: We multiply when you reap us. The blood of Christians is seed.

There is a similarity of content, if not of purpose, between this work and Tertullian's Ad nationes—published earlier in the same year—and it has been claimed that the latter is a finished draft of Apologeticus. There arises also the question of similarity to Minucius Felix's dialogue Octavius. Some paragraphs are shared by both texts; it is not known which predated the other.

Tertullian's brief De testimonio animae ("Concerning the Evidences of the Soul") is an appendix to the Apologeticus, intended to illustrate the meaning of the phrase testimonium animae naturaliter christianae in chapter 17).

== Authorship ==
Not much is known about the life of Quintus Septimus Florens Tertullian. Some scholars believe him to have been a presbyter (priest) of the Christian Church, the son of a Roman centurion, and have him training to be a lawyer in Rome. Others, like David Wright, find that to be highly improbable. "No firm evidence places him in Rome at all, or for that matter anywhere outside of Carthage… It is in the well-educated circles in Carthage," Wright argues, "that Tertullian most securely belongs". Sometime after his conversion to the Christian faith, Tertullian left the mainstream Church in favour of the Montanist movement which he remained a part of for at least 10–15 years of his active life and whose influence can be seen in many of his later works.

== Ascribed date ==
Apologeticus, his most famous apologetic work, was written in Carthage in the summer or autumn of AD 197, during the reign of Septimius Severus. Using this date, most scholars agree that Tertullian's conversion to Christianity occurred sometime before 197, possibly around 195. It was written before the edict of Septimius Severus (AD 202), and consequently, the laws to which Tertullian took exception were those under which the Christians of the 1st and 2nd centuries had been convicted.

== Oldest extant manuscripts ==
"The present treatise depends on three authorities, none of them comprising the entire work. The first printed edition, by Martin Mesnart at Paris in 1545, containing chapters 1-19, was made from a manuscript now lost, but which seems to have been a copy of the already mutilated original of the eleventh-century codex Agobardinus (now at Paris). This, our oldest extant authority, contains a number of Tertullian's works, and of the present treatise chapters 1-30; in the first sentence of chapter 21 the copyist, following his original, which had lost a number of pages, passed on (without apparently noticing any discrepancy) to the middle of a sentence near the beginning of a different work On The Dress of Women."

"The study of the manuscripts of Tert. has established that in the Middle Ages several collection of works of this author were in existence^{1}:

1. The collection of the Codex Agobardinus, the oldest extant manuscript of Tert.^{2}.
2. The collection of the manuscript of Troyes 523 (Codex Trecensis) of the twelfth century^{3}.
3. A collection represented by a number of manuscripts, which derive from a lost Codex Cluniacensis and a likewise lost manuscript from Hirsau (Württemberg), the Hirsaugiensis^{4}.

== Addressees and audience ==
This work is ostensibly addressed to the provincial governors of the Roman Empire, more specifically the magistrates of Carthage- "that the truth, being forbidden to defend itself publicly, may reach the ears of the rulers by the hidden path of letters"— and thus bears resemblance to the Greek apologues. It is structured as an appeal on behalf of the Christians and pleads "for toleration of Christianity, attacking pagan superstition, rebutting charges against Christian morality, and claiming that Christians are no danger to the State but useful citizens". Its readership is likely to have been composed of Christians, whose faith was reinforced through Tertullian's defense against rationalizations and rumours and who "would have been hugely enheartened by Tertullian’s matchless confidence in the superiority of the Christian religion".

== Genre ==
Apologeticus has the typical concerns of other apologetic works of his time, though it is presented in a much more complex manner. According to Wright, the text is constantly shifting "from the philosophical mode to the rhetorical and even juridical". Drawing from his training in literature and law, Tertullian demonstrates his talents as a Latinist and a rhetorician in an attempt to defend his newfound Christian faith. Tertullian's modern editor Otto Bardenhewer further contends that Apologeticus is calm in tone, "a model of judicial discussion". Unlike previous apologists of Christianity, whose appeals for tolerance were made in the name of reason and humanity, Tertullian, influenced by his legal training, spoke as a jurist convinced of the injustice of the laws under which the Christians were persecuted.

== Summary of Apologeticus ==
The following outline and summary is based on Robert D. Sider's translation of Apologeticus.

=== Introduction and addressing of unjust treatment of the Christians (Chapters 1–6) ===
The first section of Apology is concerned with the unjust treatment of the Christians, which Tertullian believes stems from the ignorance of the pagan populace. Simply put, he argues that people praise what they know and hate what they do not. To Tertullian this becomes evident in the cases of people who once hated because they were ignorant towards that they hated, and once their ignorance was gone, so was their hate. Their hatred prevents them from investigating more closely and acknowledging the goodness that is inherent in Christianity, and so they remain ignorant. And there is good in Christianity, Tertullian claims, despite the fact that people remain ignorant to it. Even when brought forth and accused, true Christians do not tremble with fear or deny their faith. It is the authorities that display bad behavior when they deny proper criminal treatment to the Christians. He argues that if Christians are to be treated as criminals, they should not be treated differently from ordinary criminals, who are free to answer to charges, to cross-question and defend themselves. In reality, the Christians are not free to say anything that will clear their name or ensure that the judge conducts a fair trial. If an individual says he is not a Christian, he is tortured until he says he is; if he admits to being a Christian, the authorities want to hear that he is not and torture him until he denies it. They resort to any means necessary to force them to either deny or confess, anything to acquit him. If all this done to someone simply for admitting to be a Christian, then they are surely making a mockery of Roman laws by basing all the charges on the name "Christian". Before hating the name, one must look at and study the founder and the school.

In addressing the charges, Tertullian plans to show the hypocrisy that surrounds these charges, demonstrating that those crimes exist among the pagan prosecutors as well. Then he analyzes the laws, claiming it suspicious that a law should refuse to be examined for error and worthless if it demands obedience without examination. If a law is found having an error and being unjust, should it not be reformed or even condemned? Faulty laws have no place in a just judicial system and should thus not be applied and observed. Here Tertullian mentions Nero, and to a certain extent Domitian, as examples of emperors who raged against the Christians through the use of unjust laws, simply for condemning "some magnificent good". He then brings up the good laws, and asks what has become of them; those that "restrained extravagance and bribery", "protected their [women's] modesty and sobriety", of the "conjugal happiness so fostered by high moral living that for nearly six hundred years after Rome was founded no sued for divorce". These traditions and laws are being ignored, neglected and destroyed and yet Rome chooses to concern itself with the "crimes" committed by the Christians.

=== Charges based on rumor answered (Chapters 7–9) ===
Tertullian begins by addressing the charges based on rumors, charges that vary from murdering and eating babies to committing incestuous and adulterous acts. Ultimately, he argues, they are simply rumors, for no evidence has ever been brought forth. No one has ever seen believers gather and supposedly commit impure acts or heard the cry of a crying baby because meetings and rituals are rarely performed in front of non-believers. It's all just lies and rumors meant to slander the Christian faith. Tertullian then makes the claim that Romans themselves are guilty of the very crimes it claims the Christians do. People from every age are sacrificed to Saturn and Jupiter all throughout the empire. The arenas are filled with the blood of those that fight, and the Romans even consume the animals that eat the bloodied bodies of the dead. For the Christians, murder is strictly forbidden; there is to be no killing or spilling of human blood, and that includes the killing the baby in the womb, for it would be destroying its soul. Neither are Christians allowed to eat meat that still has blood.

Of the charges of incest and adultery, Tertullian says that Christians are not guilty of them, for they refrain from adultery and from all sexual activity outside marriage, thus ensuring that they are safe from incest. Such behavior is different from that of the Romans, who through their immoral acts commit incest. This comes about simply through the case of mistaken identity: men go off and commit adultery, begetting children all throughout the empire who later unknowingly have intercourse with their own kin by mistake. In his attempt to make the Romans acknowledge their engagement in these acts, Tertullian hopes to demonstrate that Christians behave much differently from what they are accused of and that the charges should not hold.

=== Charges of more "manifest crimes" answered (Chapters 10–45) ===
Of the more "manifest crimes", as Tertullian refers to them, he first addresses the charges of sacrilege and says that Christians do not worship the pagan gods because the gods are not real, do not exist and thus hold no power or control over anything. Saturn, he claims, was once a mere man, as Roman lore and history will demonstrate. He then refutes further claims that the gods received their divinity through death, and wonders what business would the gods have with wanting ministers and assistants that are already dead. Such powerless beings cannot even be responsible for the rise and success of the Roman Empire. Furthermore, the character and nature of the gods themselves leave much to be desired; they are filled with rage, incestuous thoughts, envy, and jealousy. Why then should such imperfect and wicked beings be worthy of praise? He makes an even greater argument in referring to the pagan gods as demons, whose sole purpose is the subversion and destruction of mankind. They corrupt the souls of men by passions and lusts and rather successfully procuring "for themselves a proper diet of fumes and blood offered to their statues' images." In this way they draw attention to themselves and prevent people from turning to the true God. But even the demons acknowledge the power of God, and acknowledging this should be enough to clear the Christians of charges of sacrilege. For Tertullian, the Romans are at fault here for worshipping the wrong religion, not that of the one true God. But if the gods are real, and if the Christians are guilty of sacrilege, what does that say about Rome? The people all worship different gods and often treat their images with less respect than they deserve, using any opportunity to pawn their statues off and use them as sources of income. Tertullian further criticizes their literature, practices and ceremonies, calling them absurd and criticizing their philosophers’ disgraceful actions. Socrates would swear by dogs and Diogenes and Varro made less than respectful comments concerning the deities. The plays constantly make jokes about and mockery of the gods. Surely, he argues, the plays and the masks must be disrespectful to the gods. It is the Romans then that are guilty of sacrilege and impiety.

Christians do not venerate these false and dead gods, nor do they treat them in such a casual and careless manner. They worship the One God, the Creator of the universe. Unlike the pagan gods, He is real and His very existence is proven by the testimony of the soul, which cries out "God" despite its weakened and fallen state. His works and the works of his prophets are preserved from Moses—whose life took place 1,000 years before the Trojan War and predates both Saturn and much of ancient Rome's literary tradition—to many other key biblical figures. Tertullian goes on to briefly discuss the revelation of God through Christ. In order to do that, he speaks of the relationship between the Jewish people and God; they once enjoyed much favor from God but became "so filled with presumptuous confidence in their ancestors that they strayed from their teaching into manners of the world". Christ comes to re-establish the true doctrine; He is embodiment of Word and Reason, having been brought forth by God and thus having the title of Son of God. He adds, "his ray of God, then, was ever foretold in the past descended into a certain virgin and, formed as flesh in her womb, and was born man mingled (later changed to ‘united’) with God". Having given an explanation of the nature and divinity of Christ, Tertullian shifts to the charges of treason.

To the charges that Christians do not offer sacrifice to Caesar, Tertullian says that it is practically useless to do that, for it is not in their power to give Caesar health, wealth and power. What they can offer to him they do through the use of prayer, because only God has absolute power and from him comes the emperor. He alone brings up empires and takes them down and only he is responsible for granting Caesar power, health and wealth; "We ask for them [emperors] a long life, undisturbed power, security at home, brave armies, a faithful Senate, an upright people, a peaceful world, and everything for which a man or a Caesar prays". Tertullian affirms that by praying for him, Christians are effectively putting Roman interests in God's hands as well as commending Caesar to God. In no way do their meetings endanger the state, nor do they involve plotting against the emperor, the senate, or the empire. Their treatment of the Roman Empire exhibits the same respect and well wishes that they display upon to their neighbor. Any other behavior would not be the sign of a good Christian.

Tertullian has addressed the charges and demonstrated that the charges faced by Christians are based on lies and rumors and that no such things have been committed. After all he has demonstrated, Tertullian marvels at how the pagan prosecutors still claim that being a Christian is a crime against the empire. Christianity in general presents no threat to public order and thus its members should be allowed to meet and live in peace.

=== Portrait of Christian society and of philosophy (Chapters 39–47) ===
Tertullian then proceeds to give an explanation of Christian life and practices. He describes the manner in which they come together to worship and please God; to pray for each other as well as for the emperor and the empire, to study and consider the Holy Scriptures, and to share food—but not before offering prayers and thanks to God. Afterwards everyone is free to share a song or something they learned from scripture, praising God all throughout the night. He continues by explaining the practice of tithing, the concept of loving one another and of being brothers and sisters, being united by their way of life under the teachings of Christ. And being part of this world, Christians have to interact with it and with others. They shop at meat markets and local shops, go to the baths and stay at inns just like everyone else, though in everything they do, they "bear in mind that we owe thanks to the Lord our God who created us". Despite this, the persecutors and accusers fail to recognize innocence when they see it, persecuting and treating the Christians unjustly. Christians know true innocence because they have learned and inherited it from God; they recognize and understand the eternal punishment that exists apart from God and acknowledge and fear the one who passes that real and true Judgment. Tertullian declares, "in a word, we fear God, not the proconsul". He also addresses the claim that Christianity is more than a philosophy, bringing up the philosophers that say, "it [Christianity] teaches the virtues and profess morality, justice, patience, moderation, and chastity". He makes the case that if Christianity is just another kind of philosophy, it should be treated the same way, granted with the freedom to teach and spread their beliefs and practice, customs and rituals.

=== Concluding considerations and remarks ===
Tertullian concludes his apology by likening the struggle of the Christians to a man fighting a battle. The Christians take no pleasure in being persecuted and enduring trials, but as soldiers of Christ they too must fight for the truth, all, of course, for the glory of God. Addressing the magistrates, he says "Crucify us- torture us- condemn us- destroy us! Your injustice is the proof of our innocence... When we are condemned by you, we are acquitted by God".
