= Codex Agobardinus =

9th-century works of author Tertullian

Folio 1v

The Codex Agobardinus is a 9th-century parchment codex containing a collection of the works of the Christian author Tertullian. It is named after its first owner, the archbishop Agobard, who gave it to Lyon Cathedral, where it remained until the mid-16th century. It was damaged at some point, and the end is missing. The missing parts are revealed by the table of contents in the front. It currently resides in the Bibliothèque nationale de France in Paris, now Latin 1622.

== Contents ==
- table of contents
- Ad nationes, I and II
- De praescriptione haereticorum (incomplete)
- Scorpiace
- De testimonio animae
- De corona
- De spectaculis
- De idololatria (incomplete)
- De anima (incomplete)
- De oratione (incomplete)
- De cultu feminarum (incomplete)
- Ad uxorem
- De exhortatione castitatis
- De carne Christi (incomplete)
