= Credo quia absurdum =

Latin phrase meaning "I believe because it is absurd"

Credo quia absurdum is a Latin phrase that means "I believe because it is absurd", originally misattributed to Tertullian in his De Carne Christi. It is believed to be a paraphrasing of Tertullian's "prorsus credibile est, quia ineptum est" which means "it is completely credible because it is unsuitable", or "certum est, quia impossibile" which means "it is certain because it is impossible". Early modern, Protestant and Enlightenment rhetoric against Catholicism and religion more broadly resulted in this phrase being changed to "I believe because it is absurd", displaced from its original anti-Marcionite context into a personally religious one. Tertullian's phrase originated in a rebuttal to Marcion's view that a human death for the divine Son of God would be paradoxical and thus ought to be rejected.

== History of the phrase ==
=== Origins ===
The original phrase, before being transmuted through Enlightenment rhetoric to its modern form "I believe because it is absurd", appeared in Tertullian's work De Carne Christi (c. 203–206), read by scholars as "I believe because it is unfitting". The context is a defense of the tenets of orthodox Christianity against docetism:

Latin text: et mortuus est dei filius: [prorsus] credibile est, quia ineptum est.

et sepultus resurrexit: certum est, quia impossibile.

English translation: and the Son of God died; it is [utterly] credible, because it is unfitting;

and he was buried and rose again; it is certain, because it is impossible.

The consensus of Tertullian scholars is that the reading "I believe because it is absurd" sharply diverges from Tertullian's own thoughts, given the priority placed on reasoned argument and rationality in his writings. In the same work, Tertullian later writes "But here again, I must have some reasons." Elsewhere, he writes that the new Christian “should believe nothing but that nothing should be rashly believed.” Scholars note further examples of where Tertullian acts by following a method of reasoned argument. The meaning of the phrase may relate to 1 Corinthians 1:17–31, where something foolish to a human may be a part of God's wisdom, or Tertullian may be repeating an idea rehearsed in Aristotle's Rhetoric, where Aristotle argues that something is more credibly true if it is an incredible claim, on the reason that it would not have been made up if it were truly so incredible to the human mind. Eric Osborn concludes that "the classic formula credo quia absurdum (even when corrected to quia ineptum) does not represent the thought of Tertullian."

=== Transmission into the early modern era and modern use ===
No notice was given to this maxim throughout the classical and medieval periods, however, the maxim first began to receive attention and then undergo change during the early modern era. In 1521, the humanist scholar Beatus Rhenanus produced an edition of Tertullian's De carne Christi. The only French translation of this work to appear in the 17th century was Louis Giry's 1661 edition. According to Peter Harrison, the first time that the maxim was quoted was in Thomas Browne's highly influential religious classic Religio Medici (The Religion of a Doctor) of 1643, ensuring that the maxim received a wide audience at this time, and Browne also shifted the context of Tertullian's phrase from a discourse against Marcion to personal faith, and also shifted the wording of the phrase from its original certum est, quia impossibile ("It is certain, because it is impossible") to "I believe, because it is impossible." Many of Browne's contemporaries criticized him and Tertullian for this maxim, including Henry More, Edward Stillingfleet, Robert Boyle, and John Locke. As Protestant anti-Catholic polemic and rhetoric grew, many writers began associating certain Catholic doctrines (and later broadly to Christianity itself by some other writers), especially transubstantiation, with this maxim. The maxim was then brought to a French audience through Pierre Bayle's highly influential 1697 Dictionnaire Historique et Critique, which catalogued controversies of philosophical and religious nature as well as historical events and persons related to them. Then Voltaire, in his anonymously published Le Dîner du comte de Boulainvillier (1767), took the maxim to the next step and shifted the phrase from "I believe because it is impossible" to "I believe because it is absurd". Voltaire also attributed it to Augustine instead of Tertullian, a much more central figure in Christian history. The maxim would continue to be attributed to Augustine until Gaston de Flotte noted the original Latin and misattribution by Voltaire, however, the rhetorical appeal of the maxim was great enough that it continued to be widely used, even to the present day, including being used by figures like Sigmund Freud, Ernst Cassirer, Max Weber, Richard Dawkins, Jerry Coyne and even Simon Blackburn's Oxford Dictionary of Philosophy.

=== Later commentary ===
The phrase does not express the Catholic Faith, as explained by Pope Benedict XVI: "The Catholic Tradition, from the outset, rejected the so-called 'fideism', which is the desire to believe against reason. Credo quia absurdum (I believe because it is absurd) is not a formula that interprets the Catholic faith."

The phrase is thus sometimes associated with the doctrine of fideism, that is, "a system of philosophy or an attitude of mind, which, denying the power of unaided human reason to reach certitude, affirms that the fundamental act of human knowledge consists in an act of faith, and the supreme criterion of certitude is authority" according to the 1913 Catholic Encyclopedia, which later states, "It is not surprising, therefore, that the Church has condemned such doctrines".

The phrase has also been used, though often in different interpretations, by some existentialists. For example, Nietzsche, arguably the earliest existentialist and nonetheless already venturing far beyond this influential set of currents, posited:

Many have no doubt attained to that humility which says: credo quia absurdum est and sacrificed their reason to it: but, so far as I know, no one has yet attained to that humility which says: credo quia absurdus sum, though it is only one step further.

The phrase inspired a celebrated bon mot by H. L. Mencken: "Tertullian is credited with the motto Credo quia absurdum—'I believe because it is impossible'. Needless to say, he began life as a lawyer." It has also been adopted as the motto for The Ancient and Honorable Order of E Clampus Vitus in modern times, and was used as an example of zen in D. T. Suzuki's book, Introduction to Zen Buddhism (which was based on essays he wrote in 1914):

A noted Christian Father of the early Middle Ages once exclaimed: "O poor Aristotle! Thou who has discovered for the heretics the art of dialectics, the art of building up and destroying, the art of discussing all things and accomplishing nothing!" So much ado about nothing, indeed! See how philosophers of all ages contradict one another after spending all their logical acumen and analytical ingenuity on the so-called problems of science and knowledge. No wonder the same old wise man, wanting to put a stop once for all to all such profitless discussions, has boldly thrown the following bomb right into the midst of those sand-builders: "Certum est quia impossible est"; or, more logically, Credo quia absurdum est. I believe because it is irrational; is this not an unqualified confirmation of Zen?

== See also ==
- Credo ut intelligam
- Criterion of embarrassment – Type of biblical historical analysis
- Absurdism
- Apophatic theology § Christianity
- Fideism
- Sola fide
- Lectio difficilior potior
- Big lie
- E Clampus Vitus
