= Irrationality =

Thinking, talking, or acting without inclusion of rationality

Irrationality is cognition, thinking, talking, or acting without rationality.

Irrationality often has a negative connotation, as thinking and actions that are less useful or more illogical than other more rational alternatives. The concept of irrationality is especially important in Albert Ellis's rational emotive behavior therapy, where it is characterized specifically as the tendency and leaning that humans have to act, emote and think in ways that are inflexible, unrealistic, absolutist and most importantly self-defeating and socially defeating and destructive.

However, irrationality is not always viewed as a negative. Much subject matter in literature can be seen as an expression of human longing for the irrational. The Romantics valued irrationality over what they perceived as the sterile, calculating and emotionless philosophy which they thought to have been brought about by the Age of Enlightenment and the Industrial Revolution. Dada Surrealist art movements embraced irrationality as a means to "reject reason and logic". André Breton, for example, argued for a rejection of pure logic and reason which are seen as responsible for many contemporary social problems.

== See also ==
- Absurdism
- Absurdity
- Irrationalism
