= Tertullian =

Roman Christian theologian and writer (c. 155 – c. 220)

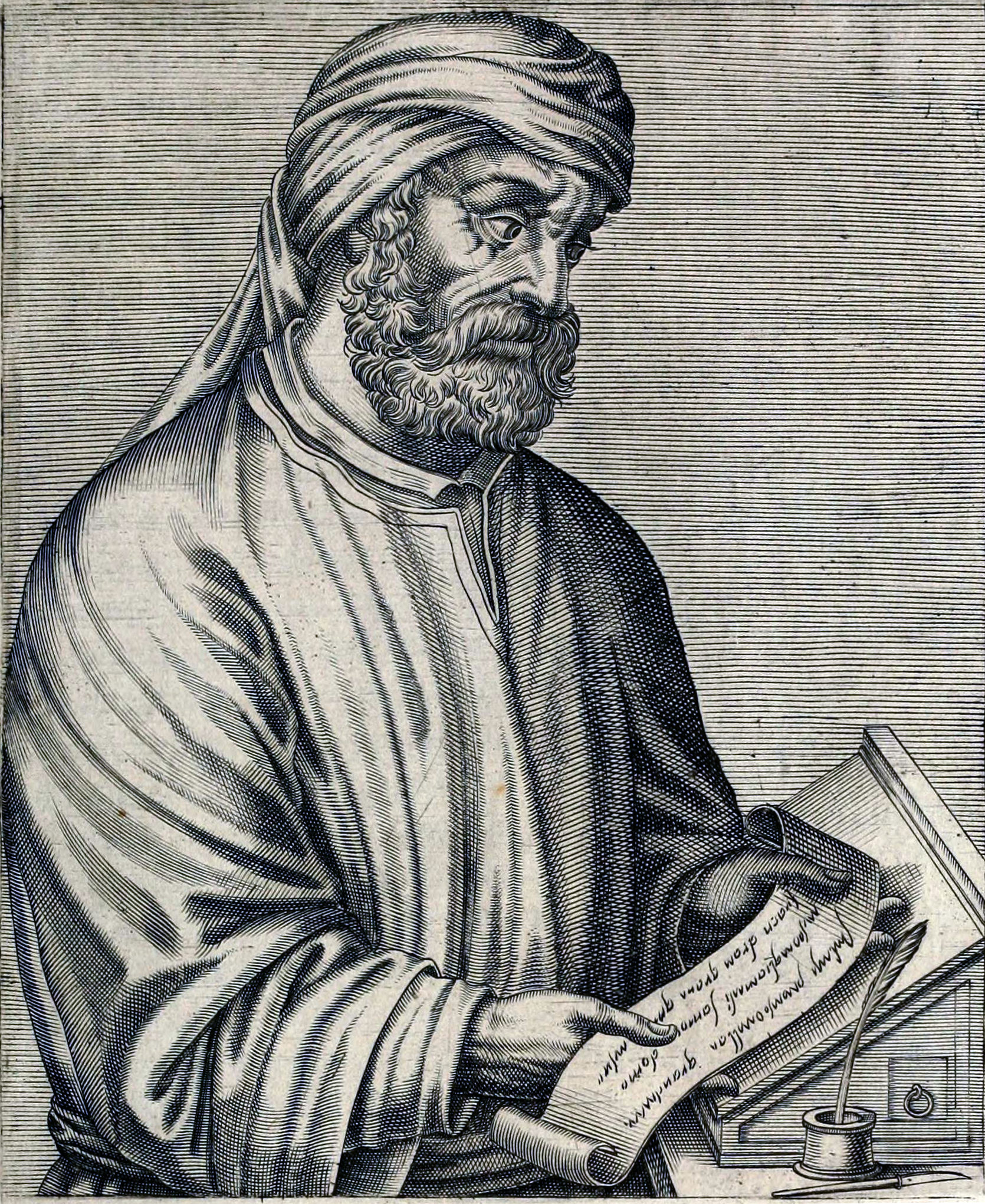
- 1584 portrait of Tertullian by André Thevet.
- Born: Quintus Septimius Florens Tertullianus c. AD 155; Carthage, Roman Africa
- Died: after AD 220; Carthage, Roman Africa
- Notable work: Apologeticus
- Theological work
- Era: Patristic age
- Tradition or movement: Trinitarianism
- Main interests: Soteriology, traducianism
- Notable ideas: Hypostasis, ousia, sacrament, consubstantiality, persona, religious liberty

Tertullian (/tərˈtʌliən/; Latin: Quintus Septimius Florens Tertullianus; c. AD 155 – c. 220) was a prolific early Christian author from Carthage in the Roman province of Africa. He was the first Christian author to produce an extensive corpus of Latin Christian literature and was an early Christian apologist and a polemicist against what he viewed as heresy, including Gnosticism.

Tertullian was the first theologian to write in Latin, and so has been called "the father of Latin Christianity", as well as "the founder of Western [Christian] theology". He is perhaps most famous for being the first writer in Latin known to use the term trinity (Latin: trinitas).

Tertullian enunciated new theological concepts and advanced the development of early Church doctrine. However, some of his teachings, such as the subordination of the Son and Spirit to the Father, and his condemnation of remarriage for widows and of fleeing from persecution, were rejected by the Catholic Church. Tertullian later joined the Montanist sect, but today most scholars reject the assertion that he was excommunicated, though he was never canonized.

== Life ==
Scant reliable evidence exists regarding Tertullian's life; most knowledge comes from passing references in his own writings. Roman Africa was famous as the home of orators, and that influence can be seen in his writing style with its archaisms or provincialisms, its glowing imagery and its passionate temper. He was a scholar with an excellent education. He wrote at least three books in Koine Greek; none of them are extant.

Some sources describe him as Berber. The linguist René Braun suggested that he was of Punic origin but acknowledged that it is difficult to decide since the heritage of Carthage had become common to the Berbers. Tertullian's own understanding of his ethnicity has been questioned: He referred to himself as Poenicum inter Romanos (lit. 'Punic among Romans') in his book De Pallio and claimed Africa as his patria. According to church tradition, Tertullian was raised in Carthage. Jerome claimed that Tertullian's father held the position of centurio proconsularis ("aide-de-camp") in the Roman army in Africa.

Tertullian has been claimed to have been a trained lawyer and an ordained priest. Those assertions rely on the accounts of Eusebius of Caesarea, Church History, II, ii. 4, and Jerome's De viris illustribus (On famous men) chapter 53. (Note: See introduction to (Barnes 1971); however, Barnes retracted some of his positions in the 1985 revised edition.) Tertullian has also been thought to be a lawyer based on his use of legal analogies and on an identification of him with the jurist Tertullianus, who is quoted in the Pandects. Although Tertullian used a knowledge of Roman law in his writings, his legal knowledge does not demonstrably exceed what could be expected from a sufficient Roman education. The writings of Tertullianus, a lawyer of the same agnomen, exist only in fragments and do not explicitly denote a Christian authorship. The notion of Tertullian being a priest is also questionable. In his extant writings, he never describes himself as ordained in the church and seems to place himself among the laity.

His conversion to Christianity perhaps took place about 197–198 (cf. Adolf Harnack, Bonwetsch, and others), but its immediate antecedents are unknown except as they are conjectured from his writings. The event must have been sudden and decisive, transforming at once his own personality. He writes that he could not imagine a truly Christian life without such a conscious breach, a radical act of conversion: "Christians are made, not born" (Apol., xviii). Two books addressed to his wife confirm that he was married to a Christian wife.

In his middle life (about 207), he was attracted to the "New Prophecy" of Montanism, but today most scholars reject the assertion that Tertullian left the mainstream church or was excommunicated. By all accounts, he was highly regarded by St. Cyprian.

In the time of Augustine, a group of "Tertullianists" still had a basilica in Carthage, which within the same period passed to the orthodox church. It is unclear whether the name was merely another for the North African Montanists (Note: The passage in Praedestinatus describing the Tertullianists suggests that might have been the case, as the Tertullianist minister obtains the use of a church in Rome on the grounds that the martyrs to whom it was dedicated were Montanists. However, the passage is very condensed and ambiguous.) or that it means that Tertullian later split with the Montanists and founded his own group.

Jerome says that Tertullian lived to old age. By the doctrinal works he published, Tertullian became the teacher of Cyprian and the predecessor of Augustine, a key figure of western theology.

== Writings ==
=== General character ===
Thirty-one works by Tertullian are extant, together with fragments of more. Some fifteen works in Latin or Greek are lost, some as recently as the 9th century (De Paradiso, De superstitione saeculi, and De carne et anima were all extant, in the now-damaged Codex Agobardinus, in AD 814). Tertullian's writings cover the whole theological field of the time – apologetics against paganism and Judaism, polemics, polity, discipline, and morals, or the whole reorganization of human life on a Christian basis; they gave a picture of the religious life and thought of the time which is of great interest to the church historian.

Like other early Christian writers Tertullian used the term paganus to mean "civilian" as a contrast to the "soldiers of Christ". The motif of Miles Christi did not assume the literal meaning of participation in war until Church doctrines justifying Christian participation in battle were developed around the 5th century. In the 2nd-century writings of Tertullian, paganus meant a "civilian" who was lacking self-discipline. In De Corona Militis XI.V he writes:

Apud hunc [Christum] tam miles est paganus fidelis quam paganus est miles fidelis.	With Him [Christ] the faithful civilian is a soldier, just as the faithful soldier is a civilian.

=== Chronology and contents ===
The chronology of his writings is difficult to fix with certainty. In his work against Marcion, which he calls his third composition on the Marcionite heresy, he gives its date as the fifteenth year of the reign of Severus (Adv. Marcionem, i.1, 15)—i.e., approximately 208.

The writings may be divided according to their subject matter, falling into two groups: Apologetic and polemic writings, such as Apologeticus, De testimonio animae, the anti-Jewish Adversus Iudaeos, Adv. Marcionem, Adv. Praxeam, Adv. Hermogenem, De praescriptione hereticorum, and Scorpiace were written to counteract Gnosticism and other religious or philosophical doctrines. The other group consists of practical and disciplinary writings, e.g., De monogamia, Ad uxorem, De virginibus velandis, De cultu feminarum, De patientia, De pudicitia, De oratione, and Ad martyras.

Among his apologetic writings, the Apologeticus, addressed to the Roman magistrates, is a most pungent defense of Christianity and the Christians against the reproaches of the pagans, and an important legacy of the ancient Church, proclaiming the principle of freedom of religion as an inalienable human right and demanding a fair trial for Christians before they are condemned to death.

Tertullian was the first to disprove charges that Christians sacrificed infants at the celebration of the Lord's Supper and committed incest. He pointed to the commission of such crimes in the pagan world and then proved, by the testimony of Pliny the Younger, that Christians pledged themselves not to commit murder, adultery, or other crimes. He adduced the inhumanity of pagan customs such as feeding the flesh of gladiators to beasts. He argued that the gods have no existence and thus there is no pagan religion against which Christians may offend. Christians do not engage in the foolish worship of the emperors, that they do better: they pray for them, and that Christians can afford to be put to torture and to death, and the more they are cast down the more they grow; "the blood of the Christians is seed" (Apologeticum, 50). In the De praescriptione, he develops as its fundamental idea that, in a dispute between the Church and a separating party, the whole burden of proof lies with the latter, as the Church, in possession of the unbroken tradition, is by its very existence a guarantee of its truth.

The five books against Marcion, written in 207 or 208, are the most comprehensive and elaborate of his polemical works, invaluable for gauging the early Christian view of Gnosticism. Tertullian has been identified by Jo Ann McNamara as the person who originally invested the consecrated virgin as the "bride of Christ".

Scholars in the past accepting the Montanist theory have also divided his work into earlier Catholic works and the later supposedly Montanist works (cf. Harnack, ii.262 sqq.), aiming to show the change of views Tertullian's mind underwent.

=== Manuscripts ===
The earliest manuscript (handwritten copy) of any of Tertullian's works dates to the eighth century, but most are of the fifteenth. There are five main collections of Tertullian's works, known as the Cluniacense, Corbeiense, Trecense, Agobardinum and Ottobonianus. Some of Tertullian's works are lost. All the manuscripts of the Corbeiense collection are also now lost, although the collection survives in early printed editions.

== Theology ==
=== Specific teachings ===
Tertullian's main doctrinal teachings are as follows:

==== God ====
Tertullian reserves the appellation God, in the sense of the ultimate originator of all things, to the Father, who made the world out of nothing through his Son, the Word, has corporeity, though he is a spirit (De praescriptione, vii.; Adv. Praxeam, vii). However, Tertullian used "corporeal" only in the Stoic sense, to mean something with actual material existence, rather than the later idea of flesh.

Tertullian is often considered an early proponent of the Nicene doctrine, approaching the subject from the standpoint of the Logos doctrine, though he did not state the later doctrine of the immanent Trinity. In his treatise against Praxeas, who taught patripassianism in Rome, he used the words "trinity", "economy" (used in reference to the three persons), "persons", and "substance", maintaining the distinction of the Son from the Father as the unoriginate God, and the Spirit from both the Father and the Son (Adv. Praxeam, xxv). At times, speaking of the Father and the Son, Tertullian refers to "two gods". (Note: "Ergo, inquis, si deus dixit et deus fecit, si alius deus dixit et alius fecit, duo dii praedicantur. Si tam durus es, puta interim. Et ut adhuc amplius hoc putes, accipe et in psalmo duos deos dictos: Thronus tuus, deus, in aevum, <virga directionis> virga regni tui; dilexisti iustitiam et odisti iniquitatem, propterea unxit te deus, deus tuus." ("'Therefore', thou sayest, 'if a god said and a god made, if one god said and another made, two gods are being preached.' If thou art so hard, think a little! And that thou mayest think more fully, accept that in the Psalm two gods are spoken of: 'Thy throne, God, is for ever, a sceptre of right direction is thy sceptre; thou hast loved justice and hast hated iniquity, therefore God, thy God, hath anointed thee.'") Adv. Prax. 13) He says that all things of the Father belong also to the Son, including his names, such as Almighty God, Most High, Lord of Hosts, or King of Israel.

Though Tertullian considered the Father to be God (Yahweh), he responded to criticism of the Modalist Praxeas—that this meant that Tertullian's Christianity was not monotheistic—by noting that even though there was one God (Yahweh, who became the Father when the Son became his agent of creation), the Son could also be referred to as God, when referred to apart from the Father, because the Son—though subordinate to God—is entitled to be called God "from the unity of the Father" in regard to being formed from a portion of His substance. (Note: "Si filium nolunt secundum a patre reputari ne secundus duos faciat deos dici, ostendimus etiam duos deos in scriptura relatos et duos dominos: et tamen ne de isto scandalizentur, rationem reddimus qua dei non duo dicantur nec domini sed qua pater et filius duo, et hoc non ex separatione substantiae sed ex dispositione, cum individuum et inseparatum filium a patre pronuntiamus, nec statu sed gradu alium, qui etsi deus dicatur quando nominatur singularis, non ideo duos deos faciat sed unum, hoc ipso quod et deus ex unitate patris vocari habeat." ("If they do not wish that the Son be considered second to the Father, lest being second he cause it to be said that there are two gods, we have also showed that two gods are related in Scripture, and two lords. And yet, let them not be scandalized by this – we give a reason why there are not said to be two gods nor lords but rather two as a Father and a Son. And this not from separation of substance but from disposition, since we pronounce the Son undivided and unseparated from the Father, other not in status but in grade, who although he is said to be God when mentioned by himself, does not therefore make two gods but one, by the fact that he is also entitled to be called God from the unity of the Father.") Adv. Prax. 19)

The Catholic Encyclopedia comments that for Tertullian, "There was a time when there was no Son and no sin, when God was neither Father nor Judge." Similarly J. N. D. Kelly stated: "Tertullian followed the Apologists in dating His 'perfect generation' from His extrapolation for the work of creation; prior to that moment God could not strictly be said to have had a Son, while after it the term 'Father', which for earlier theologians generally connoted God as author of reality, began to acquire the specialized meaning of Father of the Son."

As regards the subjects of subordination of the Son to the Father, the New Catholic Encyclopedia has commented: "In not a few areas of theology, Tertullian's views are, of course, completely unacceptable. Thus, for example, his teaching on the Trinity reveals a subordination of Son to Father that in the later crass form of Arianism the Church rejected as heretical." Though he did not fully state the doctrine of the immanence of the Trinity, according to B. B. Warfield, he went a long distance in the way of approach to it.

==== Apostolicity ====
Tertullian was a defender of the necessity of apostolicity. In his Prescription Against Heretics, he explicitly challenges heretics to produce evidence of the apostolic succession of their communities.

==== Eucharist ====
Unlike many early Christian writers, Tertullian (along with Clement of Alexandria) used the word "figure" and "symbol" to define the Eucharist, since in his book Against Marcion he implied that "this is my body" should be interpreted as "a figure of my body"; others have also suggested that he believed in a spiritual presence in the Eucharist.

==== Baptism ====
Tertullian advises the postponement of baptism of little children and the unmarried, he mentions that it was customary to baptize infants, with sponsors speaking on their behalf. He argued that an infant ran the risk of growing up and then falling into sin, which could cause them to lose their salvation, if they were baptized as infants.

Contrary to early Syrian baptismal doctrine and practice, Tertullian describes baptism as a cleansing and preparation process which precedes the reception of the Holy Spirit in post-baptismal anointing (De Baptismo 6). De Baptismo includes the earliest known mention of a prayer for the consecration of the waters of baptism.

Tertullian had an ex opere operato view of the baptism, thus the efficacy of baptism was not dependent upon the faith of the receiver. He also believed that in an emergency, the laity can give the baptism.

==== The Church ====
According to James Puglisi, Tertullian interpreted that in Matthew 16:18–19 "the rock" refers to Peter. For him, Peter is the type of the original (apostolic) Church, from which the various local churches proceed, and by which all such latter churches comprise the one unified Church. He mocked Pope Calixtus or Agrippinus (to which he was referring is debated) when he challenged him on the Church forgiving capital sinners and letting them back into the Church. He believed that the people who committed grave sins, such as sorcery, fornication and murder, should not be let inside the Church.

==== Marriage ====
Tertullian's later view of marriage, such as in his book Exhortation to Chastity, may have been heavily influenced by Montanism. He had previously held marriage to be fundamentally good, but after his alleged conversion to Montanism he denied its goodness. He argues that marriage is considered to be good "when it is compared with the greatest of all evils". He argued that before the coming of Christ, the command to reproduce was a prophetic sign pointing to the coming of the Church; after it came, the command was superseded. He also believed lust for one's wife and for another woman were essentially the same, so that marital desire was similar to adulterous desire. He believed that sex even in marriage would disrupt the Christian life and that abstinence was the best way to achieve the clarity of the soul. Tertullian's views would later influence much of the western church.

Tertullian was the first to introduce a view of "sexual hierarchy": he believed that those who abstain from sexual relations should have a higher hierarchy in the church than those who do not, because he saw sexual relations as a barrier that stopped one from a close relationship with God.

==== Scripture ====
Tertullian did not have a specific listing of the canon; however, he quotes 1 John, 1 Peter, Jude, Revelation, the Pauline epistles and the four Gospels. In his later books, he also started to use the Shepherd of Hermas. Tertullian made no references to the book of Tobit; however, in his book Adversus Marcionem he quotes the book of Judith. He quoted most of the Old Testament including many deuterocanonical books, however he never used the books of Chronicles, Ruth, Esther, 2 Maccabees, 2 John and 3 John. He defended the Book of Enoch and he believed that the book was omitted by the Jews from the canon. He believed that the epistle to the Hebrews was made by Barnabas. For Tertullian, scripture was authoritative; he used scripture as the primary source in almost every chapter of his every work, and very rarely anything else. He seems to prioritize the authority of scripture above anything else.

When interpreting scripture, he would occasionally believe passages to be allegorical or symbolic, while in other places he would support a literal interpretation. He would especially use allegorical interpretations when dealing with Christological prophecies of the Old Testament.

=== Other beliefs ===
Tertullian denied Mary's virginity in partu, and he was quoted by Helvidius in his debate with Jerome. He held similar views as Antidicomarians. J. N. D. Kelly argued that Tertullian believed that Mary had imperfections, thus denying her sinlessness.

Researchers such as Mark Ellingsen believe that Tertullian held to a view similar to the Protestant priesthood of all believers and that the distinction of the clergy and the laity is only because of ecclesiastical institution and thus in an absence of a priest the laity can act as priests; his theory on the distinction of the laity and clergy is influenced by Montanism and his early writings do not have the same beliefs.

Tertullian believed in iconoclasm, and also in historic premillennialism: that Christians will go through a period of tribulation, to be followed by a literal 1000-year reign of Christ.

Tertullian attacked the use of Greek philosophy in Christian theology. For him, philosophy supported religious idolatry and heresy. He believed that many people became heretical because of relying on philosophy. He famously stated: "What has Athens to do with Jerusalem?"

Tertullian's views of angels and demons were influenced by the Book of Enoch. He held that the Nephilim were born out of fallen angels who mingled with human women and had sexual relations. He believed that because of the actions of the watchers as described in the Book of Enoch, men would later judge angels. He believed that angels are inferior to humans, and not made in the image of God. He believed that angels are imperceptible to our senses, but they may choose to take on a human form or change shape.

Tertullian also taught fideistic concepts such as the later philosophers William of Ockham and Søren Kierkegaard.

=== Montanism ===
The extent and nature of Tertullian's involvement to Montanism is now disputed by modern scholars. Montanism in North Africa seems to have been a counter-reaction against secularism. The form of Montanism in North Africa seems to have differed from the views of Montanus, and thus the North African Montanists believed Catholic bishops to be successors of the apostles, the New Testament to be the supreme authority on Christianity and they did not deny most doctrines of the Church.

==== Tertullianists ====
Tertullianists were a group mentioned by Augustine as founded by Tertullian. There exist differences of opinion on Tertullianists; Augustine seems to have believed that Tertullian, soon after joining the Montanists, started his own sect derived from Montanism, while some scholars believe that Augustine was in error, and that Tertullianists was simply an alternative name of North African Montanism and not a separate sect.

== Moral principles ==
Tertullian was an advocate of discipline and an austere code of practice, and like many of the African fathers, one of the leading representatives of the rigorist element in the early Church. His writings on public amusements, the veiling of virgins, the conduct of women, and the like, reflect these opinions. His views may have led him to adopt Montanism with its ascetic rigor and its belief in chiliasm and the continuance of the prophetic gifts. Geoffrey D. Dunn writes that "Some of Tertullian's treatises reveal that he had much in common with Montanism ... To what extent, if at all, this meant that he joined a group that was schismatic (or, to put it another way, that he left the church) continues to be debated".

On the principle that we should not look at or listen to what we have no right to practise, and that polluted things, seen and touched, pollute (De spectaculis, viii, xvii), he declared a Christian should abstain from the theatre and the amphitheatre. He felt that there, pagan religious rites were applied and the names of pagan divinities invoked; there the precepts of modesty, purity, and humanity were ignored or set aside, and there no place was offered to the onlookers for the cultivation of the Christian graces.

Tertullian also taught that women should put aside their gold and precious stones as ornaments, and virgins should conform to the law of St. Paul for women and keep themselves strictly veiled (De virginibus velandis). He praised the unmarried state as the highest (De monogamia, xvii; Ad uxorem, i.3) and called upon Christians not to allow themselves to be excelled in the virtue of celibacy by Vestal Virgins and Egyptian priests.

Tertullian labeled second marriage a species of adultery (De exhortatione castitatis, ix). He favored the Montanist sect where they also condemned second marriage. He also believed that marital relations coarsened the body and spirit and would dull their spiritual senses and avert the Holy Spirit, since a husband and wife became one flesh once married.

Tertullian has been criticised as misogynistic, on the basis of the contents of his De cultu feminarum I.1.2, wherein Eve is blamed for the Fall; The critic Amy Place claims, however, that "revisionist studies later rehabilitated" Tertullian, though many do not agree with the conclusions of those studies. This is discussed by other theorists such as Benjamin H. Dunning.

Tertullian had a radical view on the cosmos. He believed that heaven and earth intersected at many points and that it was possible that sexual relations with supernatural beings can occur.

== Works ==
Septimi Florensis Tertulliani Opera (1598)

Tertullian's writings are edited in volumes 1–2 of the Patrologia Latina, and modern texts exist in the Corpus Christianorum Latinorum. English translations by Sydney Thelwall and Philip Holmes can be found in volumes III and IV of the Ante-Nicene Fathers which are freely available online; more modern translations of some of the works have been made.

Apologetic

- Apologeticus pro Christianis.
- Libri duo ad Nationes.
- De Testimonio animae.
- Ad Martyres.
- De Spectaculis.
- De Idololatria.
- Ad Scapulam liber.

Dogmatic

- De Oratione.
- De Baptismo.
- De Poenitentia.
- De Patientia.
- Ad Uxorem libri duo.
- De Cultu Feminarum lib. II.

Polemical

- De Praescriptionibus adversus Haereticos.
- De Corona Militis.
- De Fuga in Persecutione.
- Adversus Gnosticos Scorpiace.
- Adversus Praxeam.
- Adversus Hermogenem.
- Adversus Marcionem libri V.
- Adversus Valentinianos.
- Adversus Judaeos.
- De Anima.
- De Carne Christi.
- De Resurrectione Carnis.

On morality

- De velandis Virginibus.
- De Exhortatione Castitatis.
- De Monogamia.
- De Jejuniis.
- De Pudicitia.
- De Pallio.

=== Possible chronology ===
The following chronological ordering was proposed by John Kaye, Bishop of Lincoln in the 19th century:

Probably mainstream (Pre-Montanist):

- 1. De Poenitentia (On Repentance)
- 2. De Oratione (On Prayer)
- 3. De Baptismo (On Baptism)
- 4, 5. Ad Uxorem, lib. I & II, (To His Wife)
- 6. Ad Martyras (To the Martyrs)
- 7. De Patientia (On Patience)
- 8. Adversus Judaeos (Against the Jews)
- 9. De Praescriptione Haereticorum (On the Prescription of Heretics)

Indeterminate:

- 10. Apologeticus pro Christianis (Apology for the Christians)
- 11, 12. ad Nationes, lib. I & II (To the Nations)
- 13. De Testimonio animae (On the Witness of the Soul)
- 14. De Pallio (On the Ascetic Mantle)
- 15. Adversus Hermogenem (Against Hermogenes)

Probably Post-Montanist:

- 16. Adversus Valentinianus (Against the Valentinians)
- 17. ad Scapulam (To Scapula, Proconsul of Africa)
- 18. De Spectaculis (On the Games)
- 19. De Idololatria (On Idolatry)
- 20, 21. De cultu Feminarum, lib. I & II (On Women's Dress)

Definitely Post-Montanist:

- 22. Adversus Marcionem, lib I (Against Marcion, Bk. I)
- 23. Adversus Marcionem, lib II
- 24. De Anima (On the Soul),
- 25. Adversus Marcionem, lib III
- 26. Adversus Marcionem, lib IV
- 27. De Carne Christi (On the Flesh of Christ)
- 28. De Resurrectione Carnis (On the Resurrection of Flesh)
- 29. Adversus Marcionem, lib V
- 30. Adversus Praxean (Against Praxeas)
- 31. Scorpiace (Antidote to Scorpion's Bite)
- 32. De Corona Militis (On the Soldier's Garland)
- 33. De velandis Virginibus (On Veiling Virgins)
- 34. De Exhortatione Castitatis (On Exhortation to Chastity)
- 35. De Fuga in Persecutione (On Flight in Persecution)
- 36. De Monogamia (On Monogamy)
- 37. De Jejuniis, adversus psychicos (On Fasting, against the materialists)
- 38. De Puditicia (On Modesty)

=== Spurious works ===
There have been many works attributed to Tertullian in the past which have since been determined to be almost definitely written by others. Nonetheless, since their actual authors remain uncertain, they continue to be published together in collections of Tertullian's works.

The popular Passio sanctae Perpetuae et Felicitatis (Passion of Saints Perpetua and Felicity), much of it presented as the personal diary of Perpetua, was once assumed to have been edited by Tertullian. That view is no longer widely held, and the work is usually published separately from Tertullian's own works.

== Influence on Novatianism ==
The Novatians refused forgiveness to idolaters or for people who committed other heinous sins, and made much use of the works of Tertullian; some Novatians even joined Montanists. The views of Novatian on the Trinity and Christology are also strongly influenced by Tertullian.

Ronald E. Heine writes, "With Novatianism we return to the spirit of Tertullian, and the issue of Christian discipline.

== See also ==
- Christian pacifism
- Credo quia absurdum
- Septimia gens
- Pseudo-Tertullian
- Tertulia
- Descriptions in antiquity of the execution cross

== Sources ==
- Barnes, Timothy (1971). Tertullian: A literary and historical study (Reprinted with appendix of revisions 1985 ed.). Oxford. ISBN 978-0-19-814362-8.
- Bitel, Lisa M.; Lifshitz, Felice (2008). Gender and Christianity in medieval Europe: new perspectives. Philadelphia: University of Pennsylvania Press. ISBN 978-0-8122-4069-6.
- Daniel, Robin (2010). This Holy Seed: Faith, Hope and Love in the Early Churches of North Africa. Chester: Tamarisk Publications. ISBN 978-0-9538565-3-4.
- Ekonomou, Andrew J. (2007). Byzantine Rome and the Greek Popes: Eastern influences on Rome and the papacy from Gregory the Great to Zacharias, A.D. 590–752. Lexington Books. ISBN 978-0-7391-3386-6.
- Schaff, Philip. The New Schaff-Herzog Encyclopedia of Religious Knowledge.
