= De Carne Christi =

De Carne Christi (c. 203–206, 'On the Flesh of Christ ') is a polemical work by Tertullian against the Gnostic Docetism of Marcion, Apelles, Valentinus and Alexander. It purports that the body of Christ was a real human body, born from the virginal body of Mary, but not by way of human procreation. Among other justifications for the incarnation of Christ, it states that "the choice of 'foolish' flesh is part of [God's] conscious rejection of conventional wisdom" and that "Without true incarnation, there can be no true redemption... God must have flesh, in order to have a real death and real resurrection." (De Carne Christi, Mahé edition).

The work contains the phrase prorsus credibile est, quia ineptum est ("it is immediately credible – because it is silly" or "it is by all means to be believed, because it is absurd"), which is commonly paraphrased as Credo quia absurdum ("I believe because it is absurd").
