= Eric Osborn =

Australian minister and theologian (1922–2007)

Eric Francis Osborn (1922–2007) was an Australian minister and theologian. He was the Professor of New Testament and Early Church History at the Theological Hall of Queen's College in Melbourne, Australia.

== Selected publications ==
- Osborn, Eric F. (2003). Tertullian, First Theologian of the West. Cambridge, UK: Cambridge University Press. ISBN 9780521524957.
- The Emergence of Christian Theology (Cambridge University Press: 2005)
- Clement of Alexandria (Cambridge University Press: 2008)
