= Emotional validation =

Psychological concept

Emotional validation is a process which involves acknowledging and accepting another individual's inner emotional experience, without necessarily agreeing with or justifying it, and possibly also communicating that acceptance. It is a process that fosters empathy, strengthens relationships, and helps resolve conflicts. Contrarily, emotional invalidation occurs when an individual's emotional experience is rejected, ignored, or judged, often through words or actions indicating that their emotions are unwarranted or irrational for the situation.

== Affecting factors ==
Emotional validation is recognized as an important tool for developing empathy, strengthening bonds, resolving conflicts, and providing effective comfort during the grieving process. Research has shown that it helps regulate the emotions of both the validating person and the validated person, facilitating conflict resolution. Furthermore, emotional validation has been observed to enhance children's emotional self-awareness, enabling them to express their emotions appropriately.

== Emotional invalidation ==
Emotional invalidation occurs when a person's emotional experience is rejected, ignored, or judged, through words or actions indicating that their emotions and reactions do not make sense for a particular context. It is also considered emotional invalidation to attempt to diminish the other person's emotions with phrases like "it's not so bad," "you'll be better," or "everything happens for a reason." Despite arising from the intention to provide comfort, such phrases often have the opposite effect.

== Levels of validation ==
According to psychologist Marsha Linehan, there are six levels of validation:

1. Attending: Showing genuine interest in the other person.
2. Clarifying: Asking questions to understand the information shared.
3. Reflecting: Commenting on what the person may not have explicitly expressed about their emotions, while awaiting confirmation.
4. Understanding: Attempting to comprehend the underlying causes of the emotions.
5. Validating: Acknowledging and normalizing the emotions and their causes within the current context.
6. Transparency: Demonstrating empathy and vulnerability by sharing personal experiences or feelings related to the situation, thereby establishing a sense of equality in the relationship.

== See also ==
- Transference
