= Meaning (non-linguistic) =

Meaning not derived from linguistic signs

Non-linguistic (or pre-linguistic) meaning is a type of meaning not mediated or perceived through linguistic signs.

In linguistics, the concept is used in discussions. It is whether about such meaning is different from meaning expressed through language (i.e. semantics), It is also Interesting, should play a role in linguistic theory, or to which extent thought and conceptualization is affected by linguistic knowledge (as in the language of thought hypothesis or linguistic relativity).

== Meaning as internal interpretation ==
The sense that sentient creatures have that various objects of our universe are linked is commonly referred to as a person's sense of "meaning". This is the sense of meaning at work when asking a person when they leave a theater, "What did that movie mean to you?" In short, the word "meaning" can sometimes be used to describe the interpretations that people have of the world. Example: "Chunks are pieces of information linked and bound by meaning. (Remembering details vs. getting an overall meaning) links individual memory traces together, to create conceptual chunks."

Basic or non-idealized meaning as a type of semantics is a branch of psychology and ethics and reflects the original use of the term "meaning" as understood early in the 20th century by Lady Welby after her daughter had translated the term "semantics" from French. On the other hand, meaning, in so far as it was later objectified by not considering particular situations and the real intentions of speakers and writers, examines the ways in which words, phrases, and sentences can seem to have meaning. Objectified semantics is contrasted with communication-focused semantics where understanding the intent and assumptions of particular speakers and writers is primary as in the idea that people mean and not words, sentences or propositions. An underlying difference is that where causes are identified with relations or laws then it is normal to objectify meaning and consider it a branch of linguistics, while if causes are identified with particular agents, objects, or forces as if to cause means to influence as most historians and practical people assume, then real or non-objectified meaning is primary and we are dealing with intent or purpose as an aspect of human psychology, especially since human intent can be and often is independent of language and linguistics.

Connotation, such as good or bad reputation, in contrast to denotation, can be considered a kind of non-linguistic meaning.

== Semantic meaning ==
The word "meaning" can be used to describe the internal workings of the mind, independently of any linguistic activity. This sort of meaning is deeply psychological. If we look for other uses we can find intent, feeling, implication, importance, value, and signification. Since the negative form "meaningless" challenges and would deny these uses, experts believe that underlying them all are understanding and understandability.

One approach to this way of understanding meaning was the psychosocial theorist Erik Erikson. Erikson had a certain perspective on the role of meaning in the process of human bodily development and socialization. Within his model, a "meaning" is the external source of gratification associated with the human erogenous zones and their respective modes. See imprinting (psychology) for some related topics.

Some communication by body language arises out of bodily signals that follow directly out of human instinct. Blushing, tears, erections and the startle reaction are examples. This type of communication is usually unintentional, but nevertheless conveys certain information to anyone present.

== Pragmatics ==
Non-linguistic meaning may be identified as pragmatics, and include beliefs, implicatures, social factors and other features of the context. Paul Grice distinguished natural (i.e. non-linguistic) from non-natural meaning, as the latter is intention-based.

This perspective is related to the pragmatists, who insist that the meaning of an expression is its consequences. A proponent of this view was Charles Sanders Peirce, who wrote the following:

The whole function of thought is to produce habits of action... To develop its meaning, we have, therefore, simply to determine what habits it produces, for what a thing means is simply what habits it involves. Now, the identity of a habit depends on how it might lead us to act, not merely under such circumstances as are likely to arise, but under such as might possibly occur, no matter how improbable they may be. ...I only desire to point out how impossible it is that we should have an idea in our minds which relates to anything but conceived sensible effects of things. Our idea of anything is our idea of its sensible effects; and if we fancy that we have any other we deceive ourselves.

— (from the essay "How to Make Our Ideas Clear", hosted courtesy of peirce.org).

Outside of the Pragmatic tradition was Canadian 20th century philosopher of media Marshall McLuhan. His famous dictum, "the medium is the message", can be understood to be a consequentialist theory of meaning. His idea was that the medium which is used to communicate carries with it information: namely, the consequences that arise from the fact that the medium has become popular. For example, one "meaning" of the light bulb might be the idea of being able to read during the night.

== Meaning and cognition ==
Some non-linguistic meaning emerges from natural history as a development over vast periods of time. This is the theory behind autopoiesis and self-organization. Some social scientists use autopoiesis as a model for the development of structural coupling in the family.

A typical example of this kind of relationship is the predator-prey relationship. These relations carry strong intrinsic (life and death) meaning for all living organisms, including people.

Observations of child development and of behavioral abnormalities in some people indicate that some innate capabilities of human beings are essential to the process of meaning creation. Two examples are:

- rapid language development in children, at a pace that can not be accounted for by the usual learning process.
- the functioning of a personal "theory of mind" about other people, or empathy, as an innate capability of most people. (Recently published research points to a reflex-based "model of mind" that is built upon the mirror neurons - that we share with certain other creatures.)

== Ideasthesia ==
Ideasthesia refers to the capability of our minds to experience meaning. When concepts are activated i.e., when the meaning is extracted, the phenomenal experiences are affected. This tight relationship between meaning and experiences is investigated by research on ideasthesia.

== See also ==
- Meaning-making
